= List of presidents of the Senate (Netherlands) =

This is a list of presidents of the Senate of the Netherlands.

Name	Entered office	Left office	Party
Charles Ignace Philippe Thiennes de Lombise	21 September 1815	19 October 1818	Government-inclined
Willem Frederik Roëll	19 October 1818	18 October 1819	Orangist
Charles Ignace Philippe Thiennes de Lombise	10 October 1819	16 October 1820	Government-inclined
Willem Frederik Roëll	16 October 1820	15 October 1821	Orangist
Charles Ignace Philippe Thiennes de Lombise	15 October 1821	21 October 1822	Government-inclined
Willem Frederik Roëll	21 October 1822	20 October 1823	Orangist
Charles Ignace Philippe Thiennes de Lombise	20 October 1823	18 October 1824	Government-inclined
Willem Frederik Roëll	18 October 1824	17 October 1825	Orangist
Charles Ignace Philippe Thiennes de Lombise	17 October 1825	16 October 1826	Government-inclined
Willem Frederik Roëll	16 October 1826	15 October 1827	Orangist
Charles Ignace Philippe Thiennes de Lombise	15 October 1827	20 October 1828	Government-inclined
Willem Frederik Roëll	20 October 1828	19 October 1829	Orangist
Charles Ignace Philippe Thiennes de Lombise	19 October 1829	13 September 1830	Government-inclined
Charles Alexandre Francois Rasse Prins de Gavre	September 1830	18 October 1830	Government-inclined
Willem Frederik Roëll	21 October 1833	20 October 1834	Orangist
Willem Frederik van Reede	October 1834	13 August 1838	Government-inclined
Arnoldus van Gennep	October 1838	October 1845	Conservative (before 1848)
Hendrik Rudolph Trip	October 1845	13 February 1849	Conservative (before 1848)
Louis Gaspard Adrien van Limburg Stirum	13 February 1849	20 August 1850	Moderate or moderate liberal
Dominicus Blankenheym	7 October 1850	15 September 1851	Liberal
Jacob Constantijn Martens van Sevenhoven	15 September 1851	18 September 1852	Conservative (after 1848)
Johan Anthonie Philipse	20 September 1852	16 September 1870	Conservative (after 1848)
Hendrick van Beeck Vollenhoven	19 September 1870	1 August 1871	Moderate or moderate liberal
Eugèn Jean Alexander van Bylandt	18 September 1871	19 September 1874	Liberal
Jan Arend Godert de Vos van Steenwijk	21 September 1874	24 April 1880	Moderate or moderate liberal
Frans Julius Johan van Eysinga	18 May 1880	11 October 1894	Liberal
Frans Julius Johan van Eysinga	17 November 1884	17 August 1887	Liberal
Frans Julius Johan van Eysinga	19 August 1887	27 March 1888	Liberal
Willem Anne Assueer Jacob Schimmelpenninck van der Oye	1 May 1888	3 August 1889	Conservative (after 1848)
Albertus van Naamen van Eemnes	17 September 1889	7 March 1902	Liberal
Jan Elias Nicolaas Schimmelpenninck van der Oye	17 March 1902	11 March 1914	Vrij-ANR CHP (16 April 1903), CHR (9 July 1908) Anti-Revolutionary Party (before split in 1894)
Jan Joseph Godfried van Voorst tot Voorst	12 May 1914	17 September 1929	Algemeene Bond van RK-kiesverenigingen RKSP

== List of presidents of the Senate since 1929 ==
President of the Senate		Term of office	Party	Parliamentary Period
Willem Lodewijk de Vos van Steenwijk	Baron; Willem Lodewijk de Vos van Steenwijk (1859–1947)	17 September 1929 – 23 July 1946 (16 years, 309 days)^{[Ret]}	Christian; Historical Union	1929–1932
Willem Lodewijk de Vos van Steenwijk	Baron; Willem Lodewijk de Vos van Steenwijk (1859–1947)	17 September 1929 – 23 July 1946 (16 years, 309 days)^{[Ret]}	Christian; Historical Union	1932–1935
Willem Lodewijk de Vos van Steenwijk	Baron; Willem Lodewijk de Vos van Steenwijk (1859–1947)	17 September 1929 – 23 July 1946 (16 years, 309 days)^{[Ret]}	Christian; Historical Union	1935–1937
Willem Lodewijk de Vos van Steenwijk	Baron; Willem Lodewijk de Vos van Steenwijk (1859–1947)	17 September 1929 – 23 July 1946 (16 years, 309 days)^{[Ret]}	Christian; Historical Union	1937–1946
Roelof Kranenburg	Dr. Roelof Kranenburg (1880–1956)	23 July 1946 – 1 June 1951 (4 years, 313 days)^{[Res]}	Free-thinking; Democratic League	1946–1948
Roelof Kranenburg	Dr. Roelof Kranenburg (1880–1956)	23 July 1946 – 1 June 1951 (4 years, 313 days)^{[Res]}	Labour Party	1948–1951
Jan Jonkman	Jan Jonkman (1891–1976)	1 June 1951 – 20 September 1966 (18 years, 111 days)^{[Ret]}	Labour Party	1948–1951
Jan Jonkman	Jan Jonkman (1891–1976)	1 June 1951 – 20 September 1966 (18 years, 111 days)^{[Ret]}	Labour Party	1951–1952
Jan Jonkman	Jan Jonkman (1891–1976)	1 June 1951 – 20 September 1966 (18 years, 111 days)^{[Ret]}	Labour Party	1952–1955
Jan Jonkman	Jan Jonkman (1891–1976)	1 June 1951 – 20 September 1966 (18 years, 111 days)^{[Ret]}	Labour Party	1956–1960
Jan Jonkman	Jan Jonkman (1891–1976)	1 June 1951 – 20 September 1966 (18 years, 111 days)^{[Ret]}	Labour Party	1960–1963
Jan Jonkman	Jan Jonkman (1891–1976)	1 June 1951 – 20 September 1966 (18 years, 111 days)^{[Ret]}	Labour Party	1963–1966
Jannis Pieter Mazure	Dr. Jan Mazure (1899–1990)	20 September 1966 – 16 September 1969 (2 years, 361 days)^{[Ret]}	Labour Party	1966–1969
Maarten de Niet Gerritzoon	Maarten de Niet; Gerritzoon (1904–1978)	16 September 1969 – 18 September 1973 (4 years, 2 days)^{[Res]}	Labour Party	1969–1971
Maarten de Niet Gerritzoon	Maarten de Niet; Gerritzoon (1904–1978)	16 September 1969 – 18 September 1973 (4 years, 2 days)^{[Res]}	Labour Party	1971–1974
Theo Thurlings	Dr. Theo Thurlings (1916–1997)	18 September 1973 – 13 September 1983 (9 years, 360 days)^{[Ret]}	Catholic; People's Party	1971–1974
Theo Thurlings	Dr. Theo Thurlings (1916–1997)	18 September 1973 – 13 September 1983 (9 years, 360 days)^{[Ret]}	Catholic; People's Party	1974–1977
Theo Thurlings	Dr. Theo Thurlings (1916–1997)	18 September 1973 – 13 September 1983 (9 years, 360 days)^{[Ret]}	Catholic; People's Party	1977–1980
Theo Thurlings	Dr. Theo Thurlings (1916–1997)	18 September 1973 – 13 September 1983 (9 years, 360 days)^{[Ret]}	Christian; Democratic Appeal	1980–1981
Theo Thurlings	Dr. Theo Thurlings (1916–1997)	18 September 1973 – 13 September 1983 (9 years, 360 days)^{[Ret]}	Christian; Democratic Appeal	1981–1983
Piet Steenkamp	Dr. Piet Steenkamp (1925–2016)	13 September 1983 – 11 June 1991 (7 years, 271 days)^{[Ret]}	Christian; Democratic Appeal	1983–1986
Piet Steenkamp	Dr. Piet Steenkamp (1925–2016)	13 September 1983 – 11 June 1991 (7 years, 271 days)^{[Ret]}	Christian; Democratic Appeal	1986–1987
Piet Steenkamp	Dr. Piet Steenkamp (1925–2016)	13 September 1983 – 11 June 1991 (7 years, 271 days)^{[Ret]}	Christian; Democratic Appeal	1987–1991
Herman Tjeenk Willink	Herman; Tjeenk Willink (born 1942)	11 June 1991 – 11 March 1997 (5 years, 273 days)^{[App]}	Labour Party	1991–1995
Herman Tjeenk Willink	Herman; Tjeenk Willink (born 1942)	11 June 1991 – 11 March 1997 (5 years, 273 days)^{[App]}	Labour Party	1995–1999
Frits Korthals Altes	Frits; Korthals Altes (1931–2025)	11 March 1997 – 2 October 2001 (4 years, 205 days)^{[Res]}	People's Party for Freedom and Democracy	1995–1999
Frits Korthals Altes	Frits; Korthals Altes (1931–2025)	11 March 1997 – 2 October 2001 (4 years, 205 days)^{[Res]}	People's Party for Freedom and Democracy	1999–2003
Gerrit Braks	Gerrit Braks (1933–2017)	2 October 2001 – 10 June 2003 (1 year, 251 days)^{[Ret]}	Christian; Democratic Appeal	1999–2003
Yvonne Timmerman-Buck	Yvonne; Timmerman-Buck (born 1956)	17 June 2003 – 6 October 2009 (6 years, 111 days)^{[App]}	Christian; Democratic Appeal	2003–2007
Yvonne Timmerman-Buck	Yvonne; Timmerman-Buck (born 1956)	17 June 2003 – 6 October 2009 (6 years, 111 days)^{[App]}	Christian; Democratic Appeal	2007–2011
René van der Linden	René van der Linden (born 1943)	6 October 2009 – 28 June 2011 (1 year, 265 days)^{[Rel]}	Christian; Democratic Appeal	2007–2011
Fred de Graaf	Fred de Graaf (born 1950)	28 June 2011 – 2 July 2013 (2 years, 4 days)^{[Res]}	People's Party for Freedom and Democracy	2011–2015
Ankie Broekers-Knol	Ankie; Broekers-Knol (born 1946)	2 July 2013 – 11 June 2019 (5 years, 344 days)^{[App]}	People's Party for Freedom and Democracy	2011–2015
Ankie Broekers-Knol	Ankie; Broekers-Knol (born 1946)	2 July 2013 – 11 June 2019 (5 years, 344 days)^{[App]}	People's Party for Freedom and Democracy	2015–2019
Jan Anthonie Bruijn	Dr. Jan Anthonie; Bruijn (born 1958)	2 July 2019 – 5 September 2025 (6 years, 65 days)^{[App]}	People's Party for Freedom and Democracy	2019–2023
Jan Anthonie Bruijn	Dr. Jan Anthonie; Bruijn (born 1958)	2 July 2019 – 5 September 2025 (6 years, 65 days)^{[App]}	People's Party for Freedom and Democracy	2023–2027
	Mei Li Vos (born 1970)	7 October 2025 – Incumbent	Labour Party	2023–2027

^{Resigned}
^{Retired}
^{Not re-elected}
^{Appointed as Vice-President of the Council of State}
^{Appointed as Member of the Council of State}
^{Appointed as State Secretary for Justice and Security}
^{Appointed as Minister of Health, Welfare and Sport}

== See also ==
- List of speakers of the House of Representatives (Netherlands)

== Sources ==
- (in Dutch) President of the Senate at Parlement.com
