= List of members of the Senate of the Netherlands, 1981–1983 =

Senate, 1981–1983
←	1980–1981	1983–1986	→

Overview
- Legislative body: Senate
- Meeting place: Binnenhof
- Term: 10 June 1981 – 12 September 1983
- Election: 1981
- Members: 75
- President of the Senate: Theo Thurlings

Between 10 June 1981 and 12 September 1983, 82 individuals served as representatives in the Senate, the 75-seat upper house of the States-General of the Netherlands. 75 representatives were elected in the 1 June 1981 Senate election and installed at the start of the term; 7 representatives were appointed as replacements when elected representatives resigned.

During this period, the first, second, and third Van Agt and first Lubbers cabinet reigned. The former coalition consisted of the Christian Democratic Appeal (CDA, 28 seats) and People's Party for Freedom and Democracy (VVD, 12 seats). The opposition was composed of the Labour Party (PvdA, 28 seats), Democrats 66 (D66, 4 seats), Political Party of Radicals (PPR, 1 seat), Reformed Political Party (SGP, 1 seat), and Communist Party of the Netherlands (CPN, 1 seat).

== Members ==
All members are sworn in at the start of the term, even if they are not new. Assumed office in this list therefore refers to the swearing in during this term (or return date of members who left), while all members are automatically considered to have left office at the end of the term.

Members of the Senate of the Netherlands, 1981–1983
Name	Parliamentary group	Electoral group	Assumed office	Left office	Ref.
Hette Abma	SGP	IV	10 June 1981	12 September 1983	
Jan Achterstraat	CDA	III	10 June 1981	31 March 1983	
Wil Albeda	CDA	II	30 June 1981	12 September 1983	
Hedy d'Ancona	PvdA	III	10 June 1981	10 September 1981 (Note: Left to join the second Van Agt cabinet)	
Hedy d'Ancona	PvdA	III	31 August 1982	12 September 1983	
Liesbeth Baarveld-Schlaman	PvdA	II	10 June 1981	12 September 1983	
Pit Bakker	PvdA	III	11 May 1982	12 September 1983	
Suzanne Bischoff van Heemskerck	D66	IV	10 June 1981	12 September 1983	
Ton van Boven	VVD	IV	30 November 1982	12 September 1983	
Nico Buijsert	CDA	IV	10 June 1981	12 September 1983	
Piet Bukman	CDA	I	10 June 1981	12 September 1983	
Jan Christiaanse	CDA	IV	10 June 1981	12 September 1983	
Clovis Cnoop Koopmans	PvdA	III	10 November 1981	14 August 1982 (Note: Left to join the Amsterdam Municipal Council)	
Louis van Dalen	CDA	II	10 June 1981	12 September 1983	
Freek Derks	PvdA	I	10 June 1981	12 September 1983	
Ruud Eijsink	CDA	IV	10 June 1981	12 September 1983	
Greet Ermen	PvdA	I	10 June 1981	12 September 1983	
Frans Feij	VVD	I	10 June 1981	12 September 1983	
Jo Franssen	CDA	I	10 June 1981	12 September 1983	
Bas de Gaay Fortman	PPR	II	10 June 1981	12 September 1983	
Leendert Ginjaar	VVD	I	25 August 1981	12 September 1983	
Jan Glastra van Loon	D66	IV	10 June 1981	12 September 1983	
Jacques Gooden	CDA	I	23 June 1981	12 September 1983	
Berthe Groensmit-van der Kallen	CDA	III	10 June 1981	12 September 1983	
Toos Grol-Overling	CDA	II	26 January 1982	12 September 1983	
Henk Heijne Makkreel	VVD	III	10 June 1981	12 September 1983	
Jean Hendriks	CDA	II	10 June 1981	12 September 1983	
Arnold Hijmans	PvdA	II	10 June 1981	12 September 1983	
Bart Hofman	VVD	I	21 September 1982	12 September 1983	
Kees IJmkers	CPN	III	10 June 1981	12 September 1983	
Frans de Jong	CDA	I	10 June 1981	12 September 1983	
Ad Kaland	CDA	I	10 June 1981	12 September 1983	
André Kloos	PvdA	III	10 June 1981	30 April 1982	
Frits Korthals-Altes	VVD	IV	10 June 1981	4 November 1982 (Note: Left to join the first Lubbers cabinet)	
Roelof Kruisinga	CDA	III	10 June 1981	12 September 1983	
Adri Maaskant	PvdA	II	10 June 1981	12 September 1983	
Nol Maassen	PvdA	III	29 September 1981	12 September 1983	
Ria Mastik-Sonneveldt	PvdA	IV	10 November 1981	12 September 1983	
Joke van der Meer	PvdA	IV	10 June 1981	12 September 1983	
Frits von Meijenfeldt	CDA	II	10 June 1981	12 September 1983	
Jan Mijnsbergen	PvdA	I	10 June 1981	12 September 1983	
Jan Nagel	PvdA	II	10 June 1981	12 September 1983	
Wolter Netjes	CDA	II	10 June 1981	12 September 1983	
Henk Oskamp	PvdA	III	10 June 1981	12 September 1983	
Ruud Oudenhoven	CDA	II	10 June 1981	15 January 1982 (Note: Left because of his position as mayor of Diepenveen)	
Arie Pais	VVD	III	25 August 1981	12 September 1983	
Jan van der Ploeg	PvdA	IV	10 June 1981	12 September 1983	
Bertus de Rijk	PvdA	IV	10 June 1981	12 September 1983	
Kees Rijnvos	CDA	II	10 June 1981	12 September 1983	
Willem Russell	CDA	III	10 June 1981	12 September 1983	
Gerk Schinck	PvdA	I	10 June 1981	12 September 1983	
Jan Simons	PvdA	IV	10 June 1981	12 September 1983	
Mieke Smeets-Janssen	PvdA	I	10 June 1981	12 September 1983	
Rie van Soest-Jansbeken	CDA	I	10 June 1981	12 September 1983	
Bé Stam	PvdA	II	10 June 1981	12 September 1983	
Piet Steenkamp	CDA	I	10 June 1981	12 September 1983	
Suzanne Steigenga-Kouwe	PvdA	III	10 June 1981	12 September 1983	
Saskia Stuiveling	PvdA	IV	10 June 1981	10 September 1981	
Govert van Tets	VVD	IV	10 June 1981	12 September 1983	
Theo Thurlings	CDA	III	10 June 1981	12 September 1983	
Marie-Louise Tiesinga-Autsema	D66	III	10 June 1981	12 September 1983	
Piet Tjeerdsma	CDA	III	10 June 1981	12 September 1983	
Nic Tummers	PvdA	I	10 June 1981	12 September 1983	
Frans Uijen	PvdA	IV	10 June 1981	12 September 1983	
Lies Uijterwaal-Cox	CDA	I	10 June 1981	12 September 1983	
Tom Veen	VVD	II	10 June 1981	12 September 1983	
Adriaan van Veldhuizen	PvdA	II	10 June 1981	12 September 1983	
Anne Vermeer	PvdA	II	10 June 1981	12 September 1983	
Leen Vleggeert	PvdA	IV	10 June 1981	12 September 1983	
Klaas de Vries	CDA	III	10 June 1981	12 September 1983	
Henk Vrouwenvelder	CDA	IV	10 June 1981	12 September 1983	
Ans van der Werf-Terpstra	CDA	II	10 June 1981	12 September 1983	
Hommo Tonkes	PvdA	IV	10 June 1981	12 September 1983	
Els Veder-Smit	VVD	III	25 August 1981	12 September 1983	
Jan Vis	D66	III	10 June 1981	12 September 1983	
Loes Vonhoff-Luijendijk	VVD	II	10 June 1981	12 September 1983	
Ym van der Werff	VVD	I	10 June 1981	12 September 1983	
Madeleen de Wijkerslooth de Weerdesteyn	CDA	I	10 June 1981	12 September 1983	
Jan Kees Wiebenga	VVD	II	10 June 1981	15 September 1982	
Willem van de Zandschulp	PvdA	I	10 June 1981	12 September 1983	
Rinse Zijlstra	CDA	III	12 April 1983	12 September 1983	
Jan Zoon	PvdA	III	10 June 1981	12 September 1983	
Guus Zoutendijk	VVD	IV	10 June 1981	12 September 1983	
