= 1929 Dutch Senate election =

- 26 July 1929
- 25 of the 50 seats in the Senate; 26 seats needed for a majority
Party	Leader	Vote %	Seats	+/–
RKSP		43.20	16	0
SDAP		20.22	11	0
CHU		9.98	7	0
LSP		9.61	6	0
ARP		8.59	6	−1
VDB		7.60	4	+1
This lists parties that won seats. See the complete results below.
President of the Senate before	President of the Senate after
Jan Joseph Godfried van Voorst tot Voorst; AB	Willem Lodewijk de Vos van Steenwijk; CHU

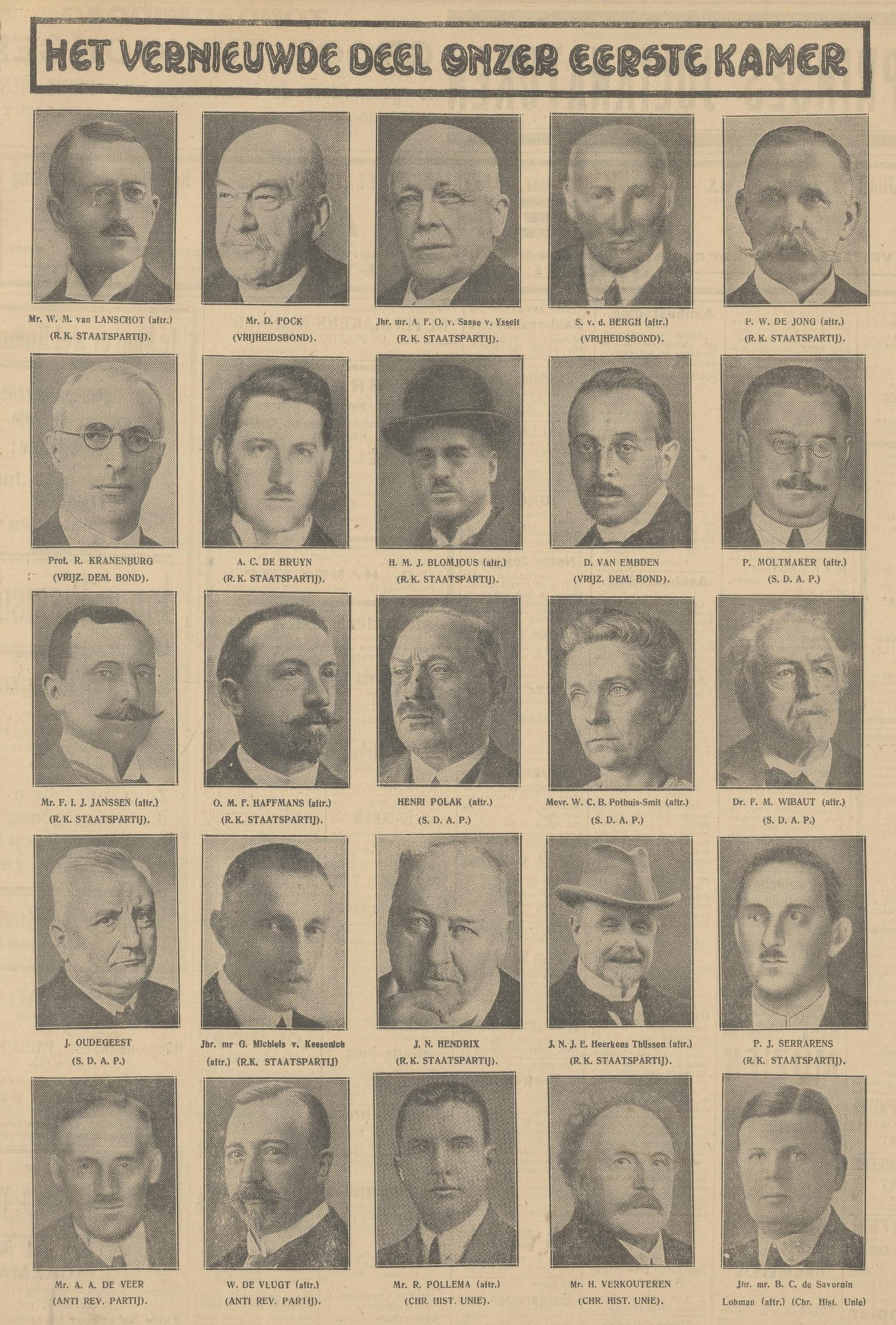
Elected Senators

Elections for 25 out of 50 seats in the Senate of the Netherlands were held on 26 July 1929. All seats in electoral group I comprising the provinces of North Brabant, Zeeland, Utrecht and Limburg, and electoral group III comprising the provinces of North Holland and Friesland, were up for election.

Within each electoral group, Senators were elected by provincial councils using party-list proportional representation. Provincial councillors' votes were weighted to their province's population.

The incumbent Coalition government retained a comfortable majority of 29 seats, down from 30, with the Anti-Revolutionary Party losing a seat in group III.

== Results ==
1929 Senate election
Party	Unweighted		Weighted		Seats			
Party	Votes	%	Votes	%	Won	Not up	Total	+/−
Roman Catholic State Party	128	42.38	14,283	43.20	11	5	16	0
Social Democratic Workers' Party	55	18.21	6,685	20.22	5	6	11	0
Christian Historical Union	31	10.26	3,300	9.98	3	4	7	0
Liberal State Party	30	9.93	3,178	9.61	2	4	6	0
Anti-Revolutionary Party	32	10.60	2,839	8.59	2	4	6	−1
Free-thinking Democratic League	22	7.28	2,512	7.60	2	2	4	+1
Reformed Political Party	4	1.32	263	0.80	0	0	0	0
Total	302	100.00	33,060	100.00	25	25	50	0
Valid votes	302	100.00	33,060	100.00				
Invalid/blank votes	0	0.00	0	0.00				
Total votes	302	100.00	33,060	100.00				
Registered voters/turnout	319	94.67	35,009	94.43				
Source: Staatscourant

=== By electoral group ===
1929 Senate election in electoral group I
Party	Unweighted		Weighted		Seats	+/–
Party	Votes	%	Votes	%	Seats	+/–
Roman Catholic State Party	107	58.15	11,068	63.63	8	0
Social Democratic Workers' Party	20	10.87	1,734	9.97	1	−1
Anti-Revolutionary Party	17	9.24	1,308	7.52	1	0
Liberal State Party	15	8.15	1,177	6.77	1	0
Christian Historical Union	12	6.52	1,085	6.24	1	0
Free-thinking Democratic League	9	4.89	759	4.36	1	+1
Reformed Political Party	4	2.17	263	1.51	0	0
Total	184	100.00	17,394	100.00	13	0
Valid votes	184	100.00	17,394	100.00		
Invalid/blank votes	0	0.00	0	0.00		
Total votes	184	100.00	17,394	100.00		
Registered voters/turnout	192	95.83	17,992	96.68		
Source: Staatscourant

1929 Senate election in electoral group III
Party	Unweighted		Weighted		Seats	+/–
Party	Votes	%	Votes	%	Seats	+/–
Social Democratic Workers' Party	35	29.66	4,951	31.60	4	+1
Roman Catholic State Party	21	17.80	3,215	20.52	3	0
Christian Historical Union	19	16.10	2,215	14.14	2	0
Liberal State Party	15	12.71	2,001	12.77	1	0
Free-thinking Democratic League	13	11.02	1,753	11.19	1	0
Anti-Revolutionary Party	15	12.71	1,531	9.77	1	−1
Total	118	100.00	15,666	100.00	12	0
Valid votes	118	100.00	15,666	100.00		
Invalid/blank votes	0	0.00	0	0.00		
Total votes	118	100.00	15,666	100.00		
Registered voters/turnout	127	92.91	17,017	92.06		
Source: Staatscourant
