= Jan Arend Godert de Vos van Steenwijk II =

Dutch politician

J.A.G. de Vos van Steenwijk
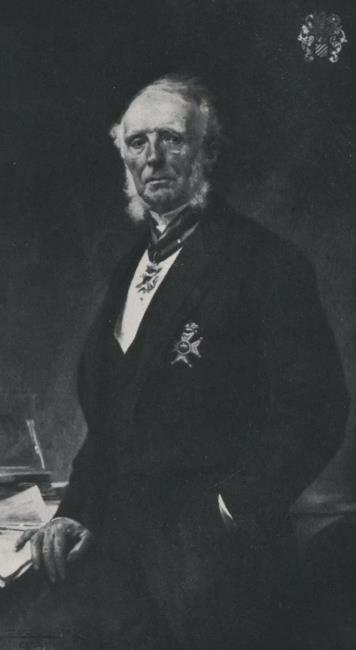

President of the Senate
- In office 21 September 1874 – 24 April 1880
- Preceded by: E.J.A. van Bylandt
- Succeeded by: F.J.J. van Eysinga

Personal details
- Born: 25 September 1818 De Wijk, Netherlands
- Died: 17 October 1905 (aged 87) Brummen, Netherlands

Jan Arend Godert, Baron de Vos van Steenwijk (25 September 1818 in De Wijk – 17 October 1905 in Brummen) was a Dutch politician. He was president of the senate of the Netherlands from 1874 until 1880.

== Early life ==
De Vos van Steenwijk came from a noble landowning and politically active family. He studied Roman and civil law in Utrecht until 1842.

== Political career ==
From 1 December 1845 until 1 Januari 1856, De Vos was mayor and at the same time secretary (head of the civil service) of the municipalities of Stad Vollenhove and Ambt Vollenhove. From 7 June 1846 until 23 February 1853 he was a member of the States-Provincial of Overijssel, first for the nobility (Ridderschap), 1846–1850, and later for the constituencies of Kampen and Steenwijk, 1850–1853.

From 20 April 1853 until 1 May 1880 he was a member of the Senate of the Netherlands, representing the province of Overijssel. During this period he served also as mayor of Zwolle, the capital of Overijssel, from 1 January 1856 until 1 August 1867. He was president of the senate of the Netherlands from 21 September 1874 until 24 April 1880. He resigned this post upon being appointed King's Commissioner in the province of Utrecht on 1 May 1880. He would later resign this post on 1 January 1882, stating financial reasons for not being able to move to the Utrecht home of the King's Commissioner.

In 1861 he opposed the design on the creation of the Council of State of the Netherlands. In 1870 he opposed the abolition of the death penalty.

== Titles, decorations, and honours ==
He was made a commander in the Order of the Netherlands Lion on 29 Januari 1877.

== Personal life ==
De Vos van Steenwijk was the son of senator Carel de Vos van Steenwijk and Sophia Cornelia Huygens.

De Vos van Steenwijk would marry twice. His first marriage was at 26 May 1843 with Wilhelmina Louisa van Aerssen Beyeren van Voshol. They had two sons and two daughters. She would die on 16 Juli 1849. His second marriage was to Agatha Maria Françoise van Aerssen Beyeren van Voshol out of which two sons and a daughter were born.

He was father of Willem Lodewijk de Vos van Steenwijk, president of the senate of the Netherlands, and Jan Arend de Vos van Steenwijk, cabinet secretary. He was father in law of Alexander van Dedem, member of the house of representatives. He was a cousin of Jan Arend Godert de Vos van Steenwijk, King's Commissioner for the province of Drenthe. He was an uncle of Godert Willem de Vos van Steenwijk, member of the senate, and a second cousin to Jan Willem Jacobus de Vos van Steenwijk, member of the house of representatives.

Political offices
Preceded by E.J.A. van Bylandt	President of the Senate; 1874–1880	Succeeded by F.J.J. van Eysinga
