= Willem Anne Assueer Jacob Schimmelpenninck van der Oye =

Dutch politician

W.A.A.J. Schimmelpenninck van der Oye
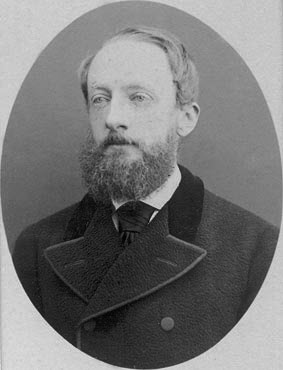

President of the Senate
- In office 1 May 1888 – 3 August 1889
- Preceded by: Frans Julius Johan van Eysinga
- Succeeded by: Albertus van Naamen van Eemnes

Personal details
- Born: 18 September 1834; Voorst, Netherlands
- Died: 31 August 1889; Voorst, Netherlands
- Parent: Willem Anne Schimmelpenninck van der Oye (father)

Willem Anne Assueer Jacob, Baron Schimmelpenninck van der Oye (18 September 1834 – 31 August 1889) was a Dutch nobleman and politician. He served as President of the Senate from 1888 until his death in 1889.

== Early life ==
Schimmelpenninck van der Oye was the son of conservative minister and governor of Gelderland baron Willem Anne Schimmelpenninck van der Oye and Adriana Sophia van Rhemen. He studied at Utrecht University from 1852 to 1858, where he got a promotion in Roman and common day law. After his studies he worked as a lawyer in The Hague from 1858 till 1862. After 1862 he worked at the Dutch foreign office in several functions.

== Political career ==
He ran for the Senate as second candidate in 1868, 1869 and 1872 in the district of Deventer and in 1869 and 1873 in the district Zutphen, but was beaten by the liberals. From 19 September 1876 to 16 September 1877 he was a member of the Senate of the Netherlands, representing the province of Gelderland. From 4 February 1879 to September 1880 he was a member of the Provincial Council of Gelderland. He then was a member of the Senate of the Netherlands again from 20 September 1880 to 11 October 1884, 17 November 1884 to 17 August 1887, 19 September 1887 to 27 March 1888 and 1 May 1888 to 31 August 1889. During his last period in the Senate he was president of this body.

From 8 December 1888 till 31 Augustus 1889 he served as a member of the regency council for Wilhelmina of the Netherlands.

== Titles, decorations, and honours ==
Schimmelpenninck van der Oye was lord of both polls (heer van de beide Pollen). He was made a knight in the Order of the Netherlands Lion on 24 July 1874 and commander on 10 May 1889. He was secretary of the commission for taking diplomatic exams and was an honorary chamberlain of king William III of the Netherlands from 4 February 1868 till his death.

== Personal life ==
Schimmelpenninck van der Oye was the son of conservative minister and governor of Gelderland baron Willem Anne Schimmelpenninck van der Oye and Adriana Sophia van Rhemen. He had three sisters and a younger brother, Alexander Schimmelpenninck van der Oye, later member of the House of Representatives of the Netherlands.

Schimmelpenninck van der Oye lived at his ancestral house Huize De Poll (house the Poll). He married Jacoba Christinaon van Pallandt on 17 September 1870 in Waardenburg. The marriage was without children.

He was brother in law of J.E.H. van Nagell van Ampsen, a member of the Senate, cousin of J.E.N. Schimmelpenninck van der Oye, a member and chairman of the Senate and a member of the House of Representatives, and son-in-law of H.W. van Aylva van Waardenburg en Neerijnen, a member of the Senate.

Political offices
Preceded by Frans Julius Johan van Eysinga	President of the Senate; 1888–1889	Succeeded by Albertus van Naamen van Eemnes
