= Hoving =

Hoving is a surname. Notable people with the surname include:

- Evert Hoving (born 1953), Dutch middle-distance runner
- Kees Hoving (1919 – 1991), Dutch swimmer
- Lucas Hoving (1912–2000), Dutch dancer and choreographer
- Thomas Hoving (1931–2009), director of the Metropolitan Museum of Art. Son of Walter Hoving
- Walter Hoving (1897–1989), head of Tiffany & Co. Father of Thomas Hoving
