= Roelof Kranenburg =

Dutch politician, lawyer and professor

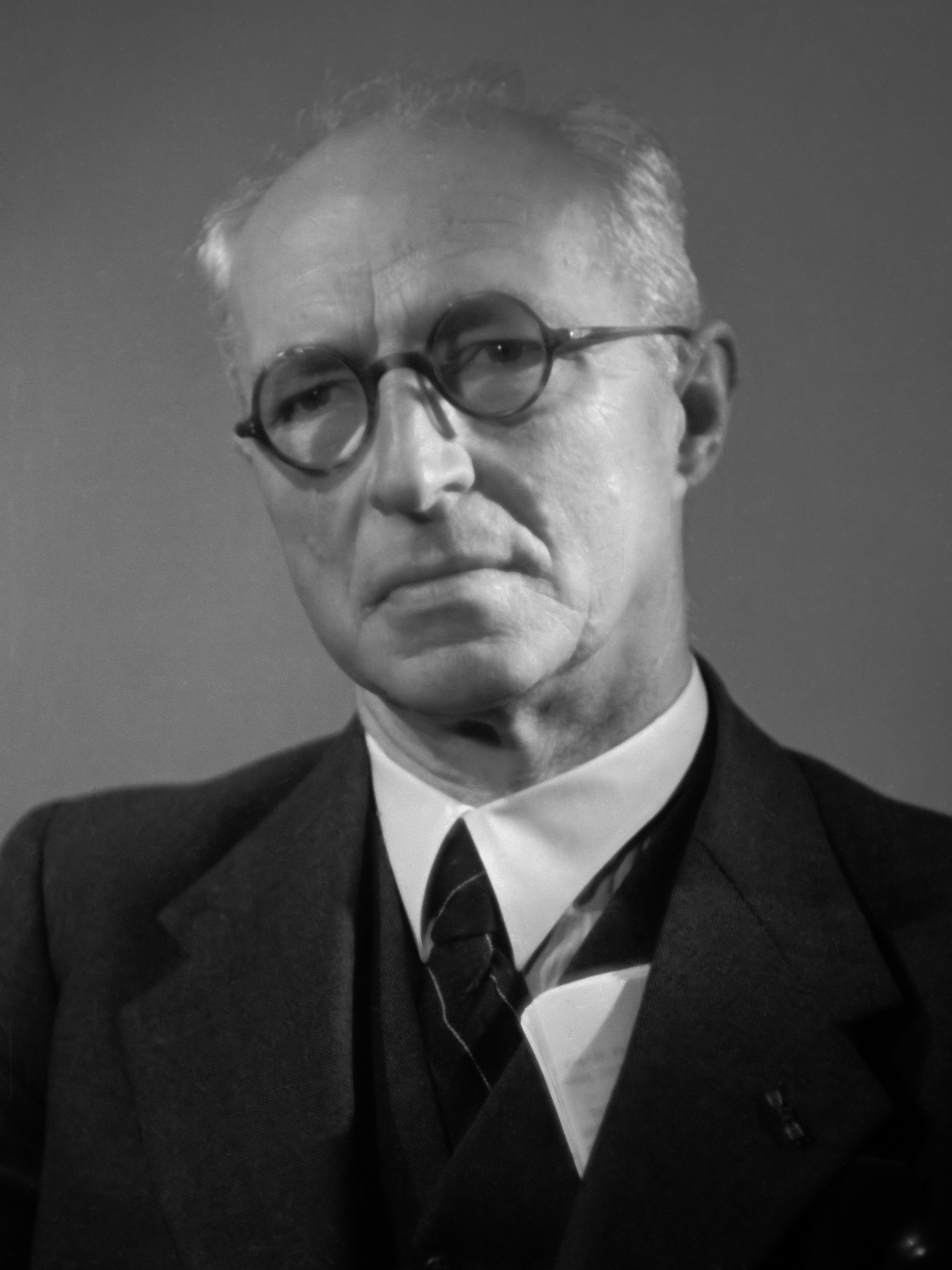
Kranenburg in 1946

Roelof Kranenburg (8 September 1880 – 27 December 1956) was a Dutch politician, lawyer and professor of constitutional law. Initially, he was a member of the Free-thinking Democratic League, but later he joined the Labour Party. He was president of the Senate from 1946 till 1951 He was preceded by Willem Lodewijk de Vos van Steenwijk and was succeeded by his party colleague Jan Anne Jonkman. During the Second World War, he was put under arrest by the Nazis.

== Decorations ==
- Netherlands: Knight Grand Cross of the Order of the Netherlands Lion

Political offices
Preceded by Willem Lodewijk de Vos van Steenwijk	President of the Senate; 1946-1951	Succeeded by Jan Anne Jonkman
