= Frans Julius Johan van Eysinga =

Dutch politician (1818–1901)

Jonkheer Frans van Eysinga
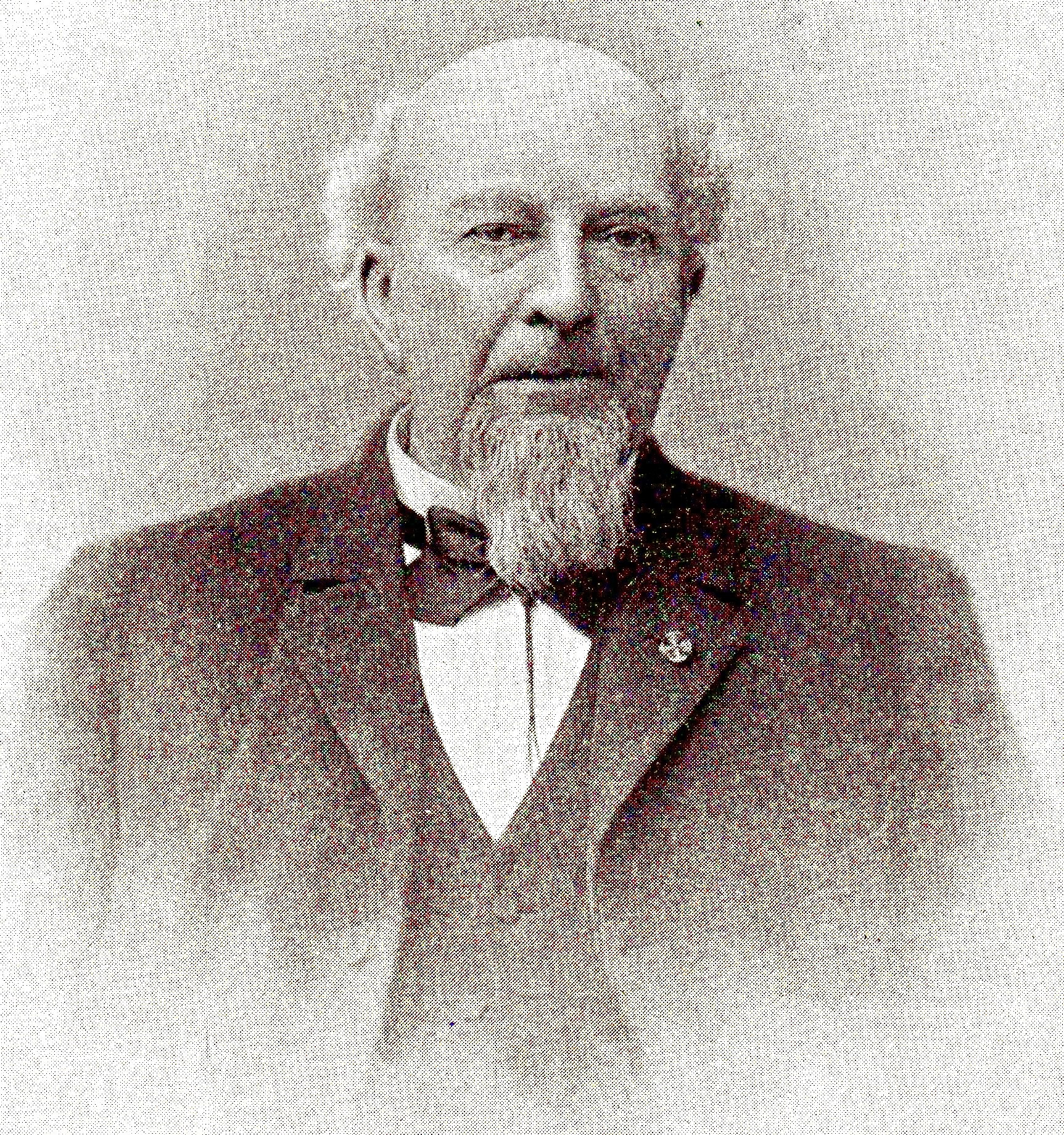

President of the Senate
- In office 18 May 1880 – 27 March 1888
- Preceded by: J.A.G. de Vos van Steenwijk
- Succeeded by: W.A.A.J. Schimmelpenninck van der Oye

Personal details
- Born: 31 December 1818 Wommels, Netherlands
- Died: 16 April 1901 (aged 82) Leeuwarden, Netherlands

Frans Julius Johan van Eysinga (31 December 1818 – 16 April 1901) was a Dutch politician. He was president of the senate of the Netherlands from 1880 till 1888.

== Early life ==
Son of a wealthy landowning local nobleman and politician, Van Eysinga studies law in Utrecht from 1837 till 1841. After graduating he practised law in Leeuwarden, working as a judge at several courts from 1848. He also held several functions in water management.

== Political career ==
In 1844 he became a member of the States of Friesland. In 1850 he became a member of the Senate of the Netherlands. Van Eysinga holds the record for longest serving member of senate, serving for 44 years from 1850 till 1894. He was president of the senate from 1880 till 1888. From 1897 till 1901 he served as minister of state.

In 1862 he was one of 12 members of senate opposed to the design law to abolish slavery in the Dutch West Indies.

== Titles, decorations, and honours ==
He was made a knight in the Order of the Netherlands Lion on 15 September 1860 and commander on 10 March 1881 for his part in creating the Wetboek van Strafrecht (Criminal law code).

== Personal life ==
Van Eysinga was the son of Idzerd Frans van Eysinga, grietman of Hennaarderadeel and member of the States of Friesland, and Wiskje van Heemstra. He had a brother and four sisters and came from a noble landowning family from Friesland. His paternal grandfather was grietman of Doniawerstal, member of the States of Friesland and member of the Gedeputeerde Staten.

Van Eysinga lived at Wommels and Leeuwarden and would marry twice. His first marriage was at 8 April 1843 with Johanna Henriëtte Reinoudina van Boelens. They had four sons. She would die on 10 January 1849. His second marriage was to Tjallinga Aurelia Wilhelmina Camstra van Welderen baroness Rengers, out of which 5 daughters and a son were born, one daughter dying at an early age.

His brother was grietman of Hennaardereadeel and a brother in law was mayor of Franeker. His third son was mayor of Noordwijkerhout. He was father of I.F. van Humalda van Eysinga, member of the House of Representatives, brother in law of W.J. van Welderen Rengers, member of the Senate and House of Representatives, brother in law of J.W.J. baron de Vos van Steenwijk, member of the House of Representatives, son in law of J.H. van Boelens, extraordinary member of the House of Representatives, and nephew of S.H. Roorda van Eysinga, member of the House of Representatives.

Political offices
Preceded by J.A.G. de Vos van Steenwijk	President of the Senate; 1880–1888	Succeeded by W.A.A.J. Schimmelpenninck van der Oye
