= Evert Hoving =

Dutch middle-distance runner

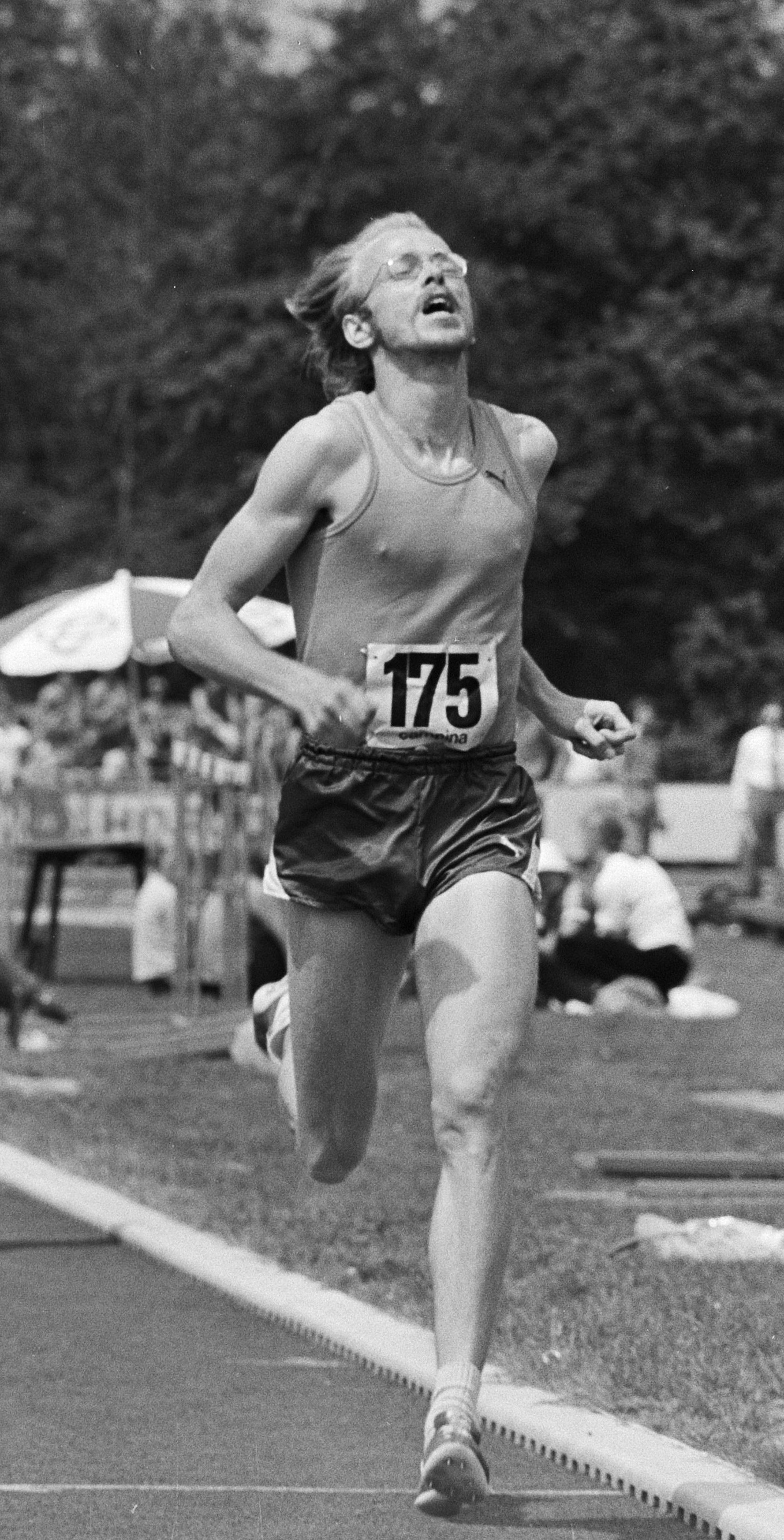
- Evert Hoving winning the national 800 m championships, 1977

Personal information
- Born: 14 January 1953 (age 73) Ambt Vollenhove, the Netherlands
- Height: 1.87 m (6 ft 2 in)
- Weight: 70 kg (150 lb)

Sport
- Sport: Middle-distance running
- Club: AV-NOP, Emmeloord

Evert Hoving (born 14 January 1953) is a retired Dutch middle-distance runner. He competed at the 1976 Summer Olympics in the 800 m and 1500 m events, but failed to reach the finals.
