= Stad Vollenhove =

Coordinates: 52.681573°N 5.951843°E

Stad Vollenhove is a former municipality in the Dutch province of Overijssel. It consisted of the city of Vollenhove.

It existed from 1818 to 1942, when it merged with the municipality of Ambt Vollenhove, which covered the surrounding countryside.
