= Nic Tummers =

Dutch politician (1928–2020)

Nicolaas Hendrik Marie Tummers (5 February 1928 – 24 April 2020) was a Dutch politician who served as a Senator between 1974 and 1995.

== Career ==
Tummers was part of the States of Limburg (1974–1978) and of the Senate between 17 September 1974 and 13 June 1995. He was spokesman for "traffic and water management", "cultural affairs" and "European affairs" of the PvdA-Senate fraction. After 1991, Tummers served as President of the Senate several times.

He also held various positions in the field of architecture and visual arts and published about these subjects. Tummers received various cultural awards including the BNA-kubus and in 2008 received the medal of honor from the municipality of Heerlen. He was made Knight in the Order of the Netherlands Lion (1986) and Commander in the Order of Orange-Nassau (1995).

== Personal ==
Tummers was born in Heerlen. He was a son of architect Henk Herman Antoon Tummers and Christine Catharina Smits. He married sculptor Vera van Hasselt (1924–2014) in 1954. He died in Sittard-Geleen on 24 April 2020.
