= Tollebeek =

- Village
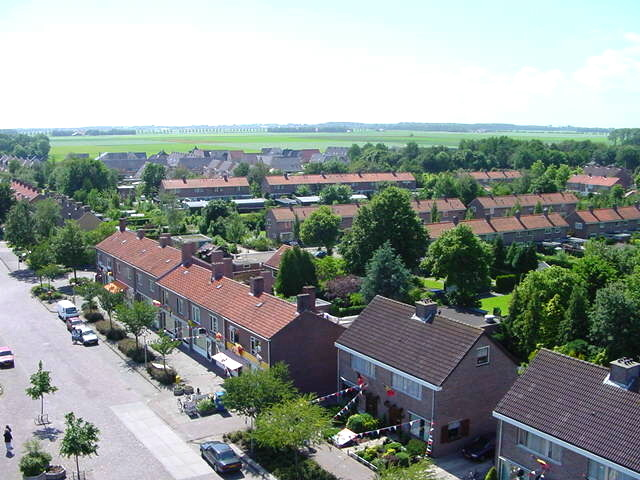
- Aerial view of Tollebeek

- Flag

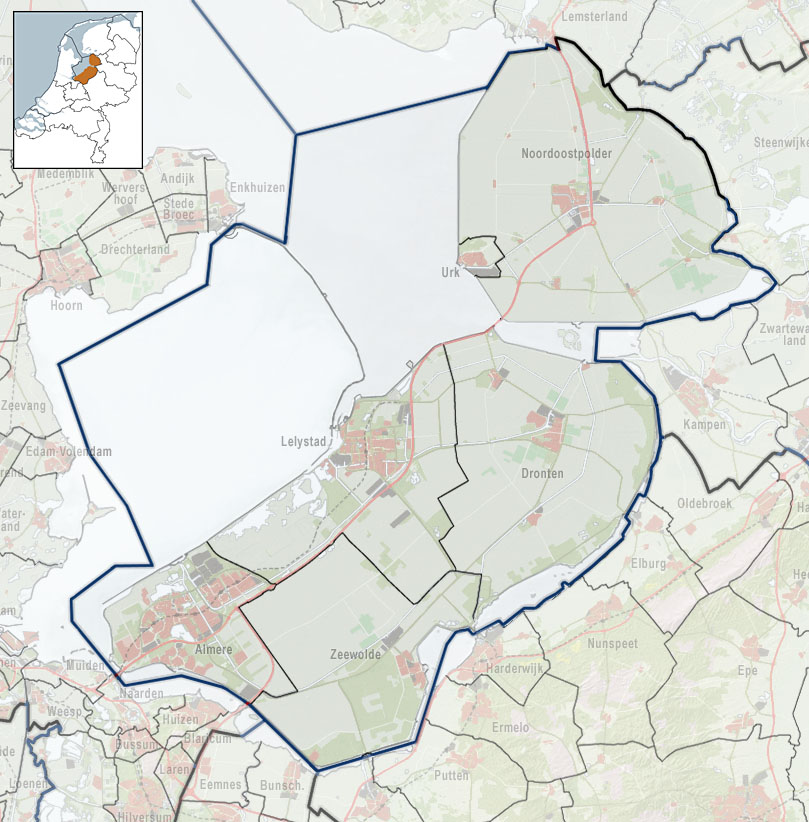
- Location of Tollebeek in the province of Flevoland
- Coordinates: 52°40′40″N 5°40′31″E
- Country: Netherlands
- Province: Flevoland
- Municipality: Noordoostpolder
- Established: 1956

Area
  - Total: 31.27 km^{2} (12.07 sq mi)
- Elevation: −3.9 m (−13 ft)

Population (2021)
  - Total: 2,455
  - Density: 78.51/km^{2} (203.3/sq mi)
- Time zone: UTC+1 (CET)
  - Summer (DST): UTC+2 (CEST)
- Postal code: 8309
- Dialing code: 0527

Tollebeek is a village in the Dutch province of Flevoland. It is a part of the municipality of Noordoostpolder, and is approximately 90 kilometres north east of Amsterdam.

Tollebeek is one of ten villages in the Noordoostpolder (literally: North East Polder) which was reclaimed from the Zuiderzee (now: IJsselmeer) in the 1930s and 1940s as part of a huge project known as the 'Zuiderzeewerken' ('Zuiderzee works') to create new land to accommodate growing need for farmland and new urban areas in the already densely populated country.

After the Noordoostpolder was formed in the early 1940s, new villages were constructed, including Tollebeek (being constructed last). It is situated in the south-western part of the polder, in the middle of a large agricultural area, between Emmeloord and Urk which used to be an island in the old Zuiderzee.

Tollebeek was established in 1956 as the last of the Noordoostpolder villages.

As of the first of January 2020 Tollebeek has 2460 inhabitants. Tollebeek is growing a lot due to new residential areas in the past 20 years. The village has grown significantly since the start of this century.

Tollebeek has a thriving community culture, with several sports, arts and youth clubs. There are two churches (Roman Catholic and Protestant), two primary schools, a restaurant, two fast food bars and a small supermarket.

== Transportation ==
The nearest railway stations to Tollebeek are in Lelystad and Kampen, both approximately 30km from Tollebeek. There is a bus service that goes to Urk and Emmeloord. The village can be reached by car via the A6 motorway from Almere and Lelystad. It is about a one-hour drive from Amsterdam.

== Sports ==
Tollebeek has a football club named VV Tollebeek . Since 2000, the first team were twice a champion, in the season 2001/2002 and 2010/2011. Tollebeek also has a tennis club with a tennis field, an ice skating club and multiple other sports.

== Notable people ==
- Daniëlle Jansen (born 1970), Dutch politician

== Gallery ==
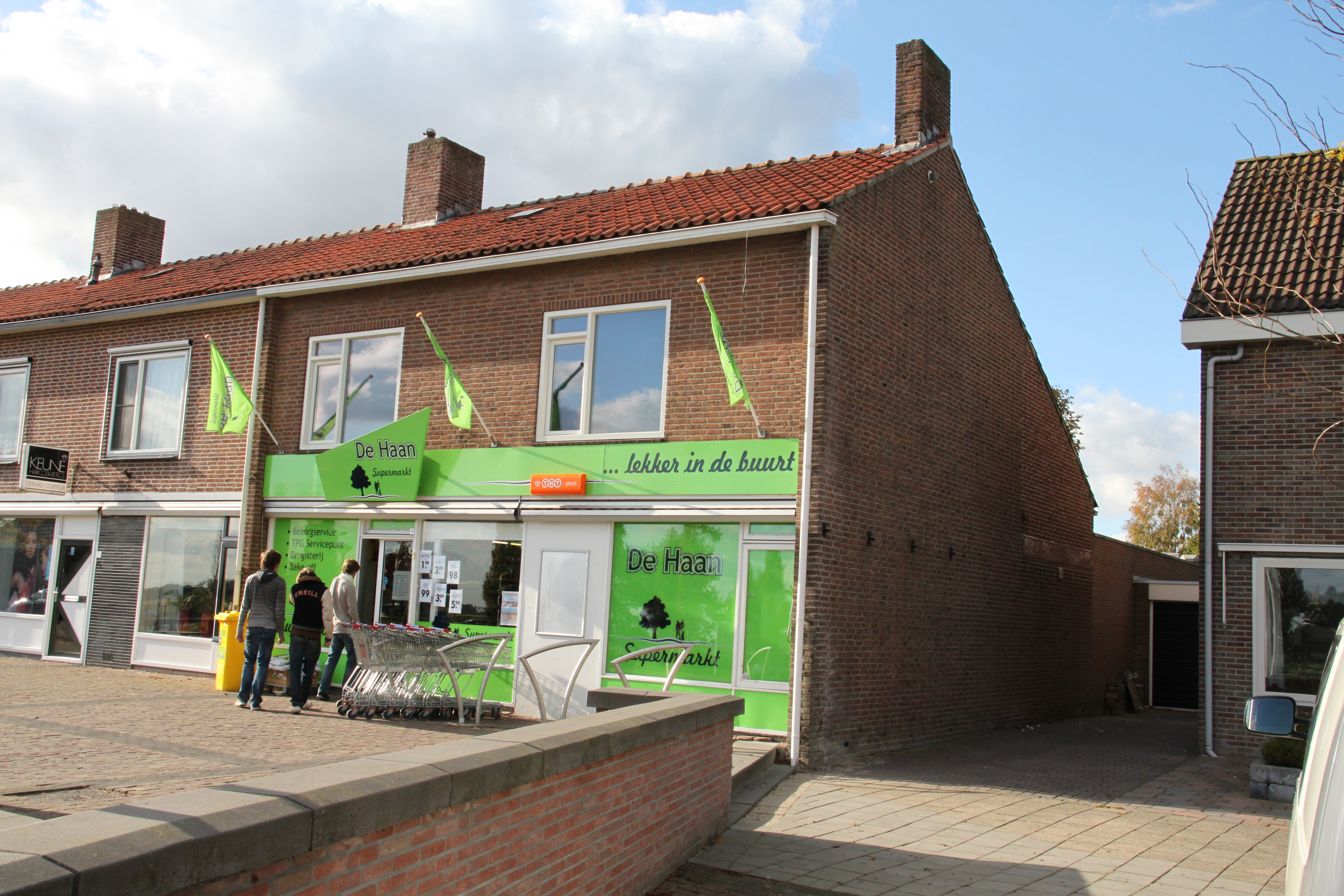
Supermarket

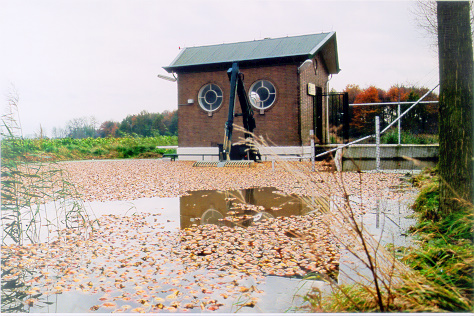
Flood in the polder (1998)

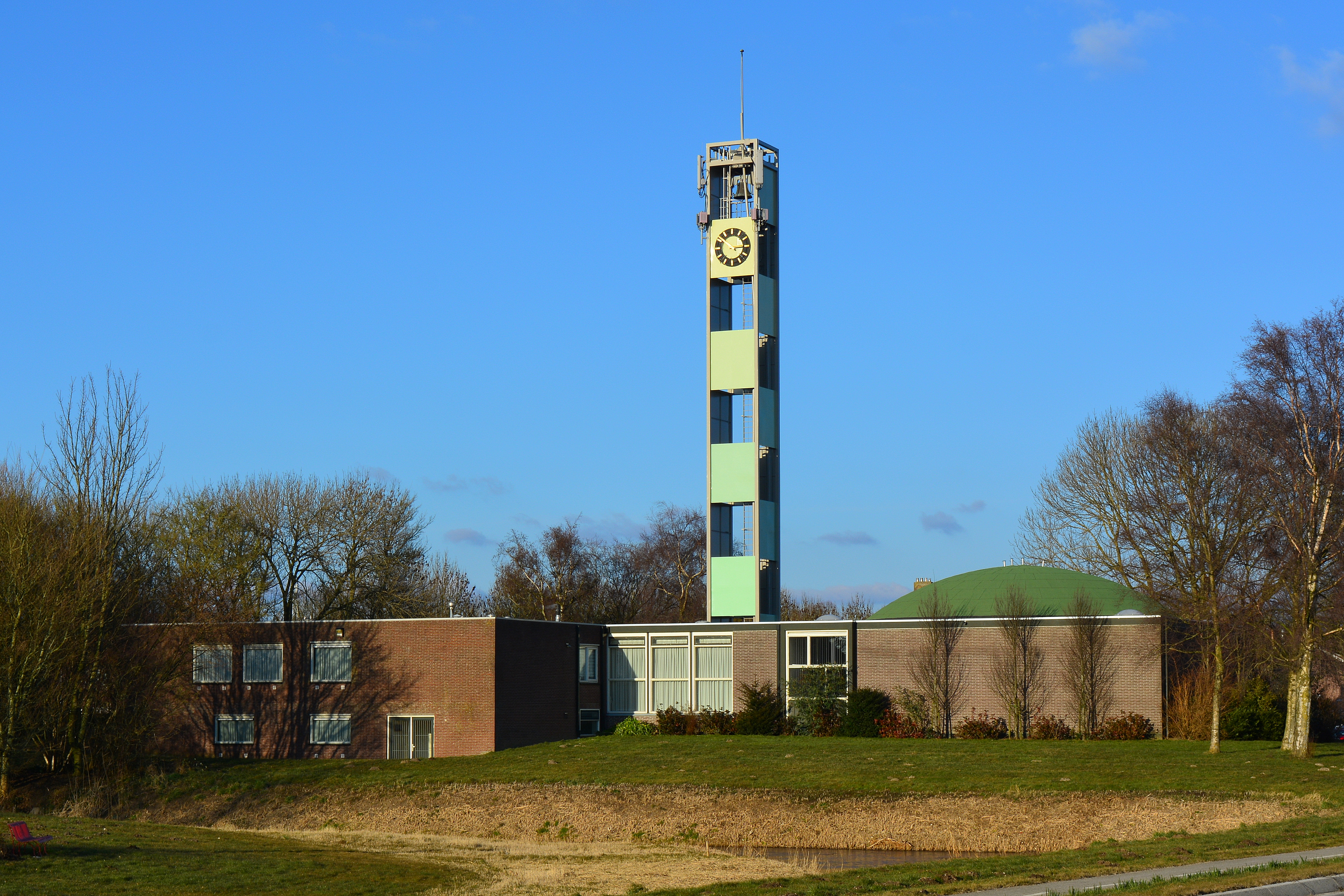
Protestant church

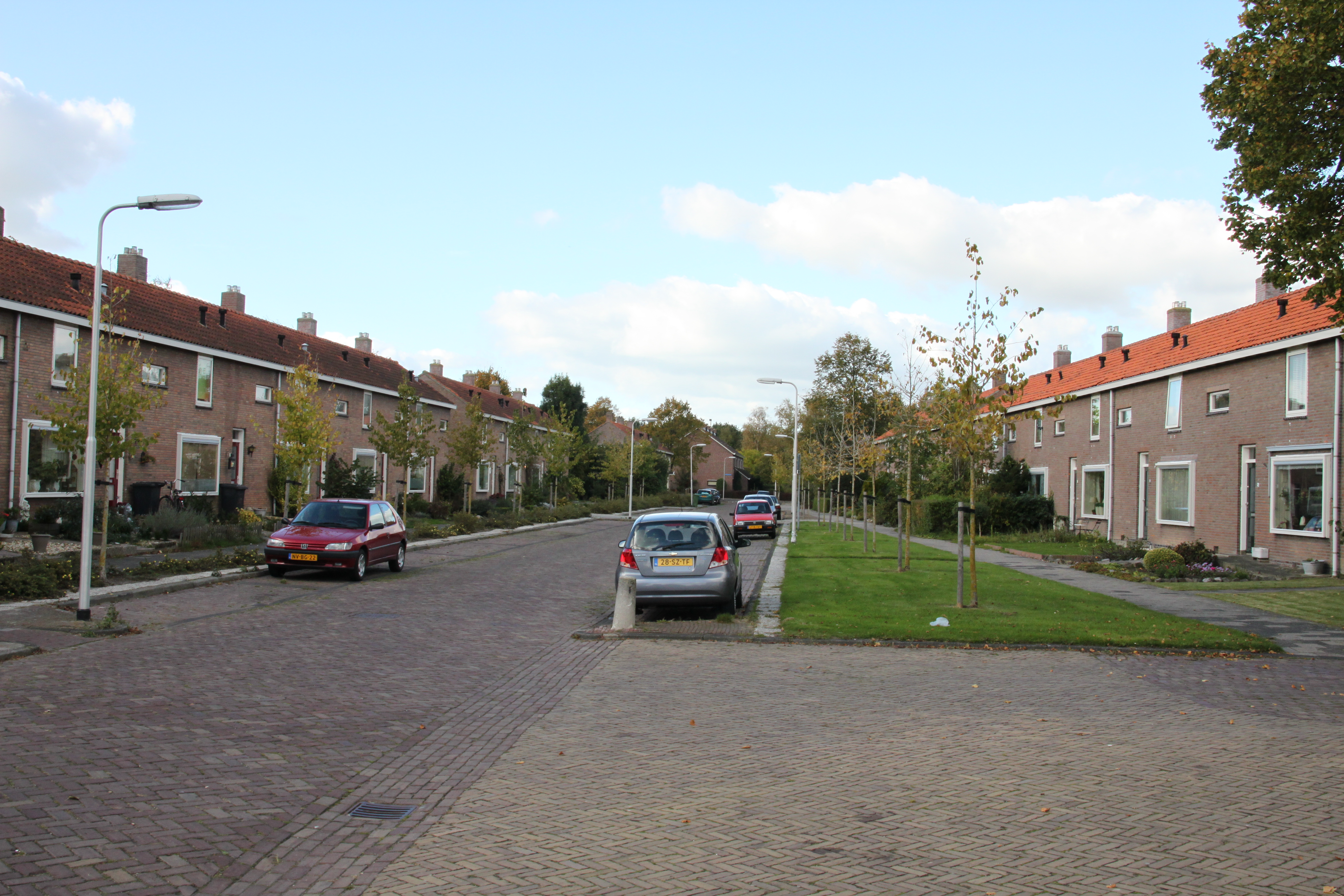
Street view
