= Maarten de Niet Gerritzoon =

Dutch politician

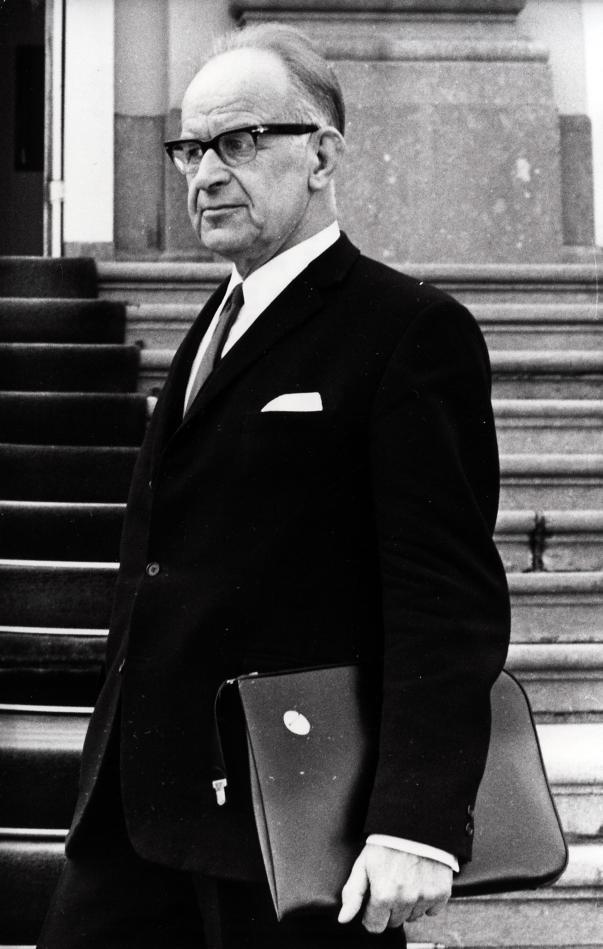
De Niet Gerritzoon in 1971

Maarten de Niet Gerritzoon (16 March 1904 – 25 July 1979) was a Dutch politician.

During the Second World War, he was a prisoner in several Japanese prisoner-of-war camps, like Sukamiskin Penitentiary in Bandung.

After the war he became a member of the PvdA and was considered to be very progressive. Between 1950 and 1969 he was mayor of Wageningen. From 1956, he was a member of the Senate as well. As a senator, he often collided with Minister of Foreign Affairs Joseph Luns on the issue of Netherlands New Guinea. In 1969, he replaced Jannes Pieter Mazure as president of the Senate. In 1973 De Niet was succeeded by Theo Thurlings.

== Decorations ==
- Netherlands: Commander of the Order of the Netherlands Lion
- Netherlands: Officer of the Order of Orange-Nassau

Political offices
Preceded by Jan Klaasesz	Mayor of Wageningen; 1950–1969	Succeeded by Theo Westerhout
Preceded by Jannes Pieter Mazure	President of the Senate; 1969–1973	Succeeded by Theo Thurlings
Party political offices
Preceded by Joris in 't Veld	Leader of the Labour Party in the Senate; 1968	Succeeded by Jan Broeksz
