= Jannis Pieter Mazure =

Dutch politician (1899–1990)

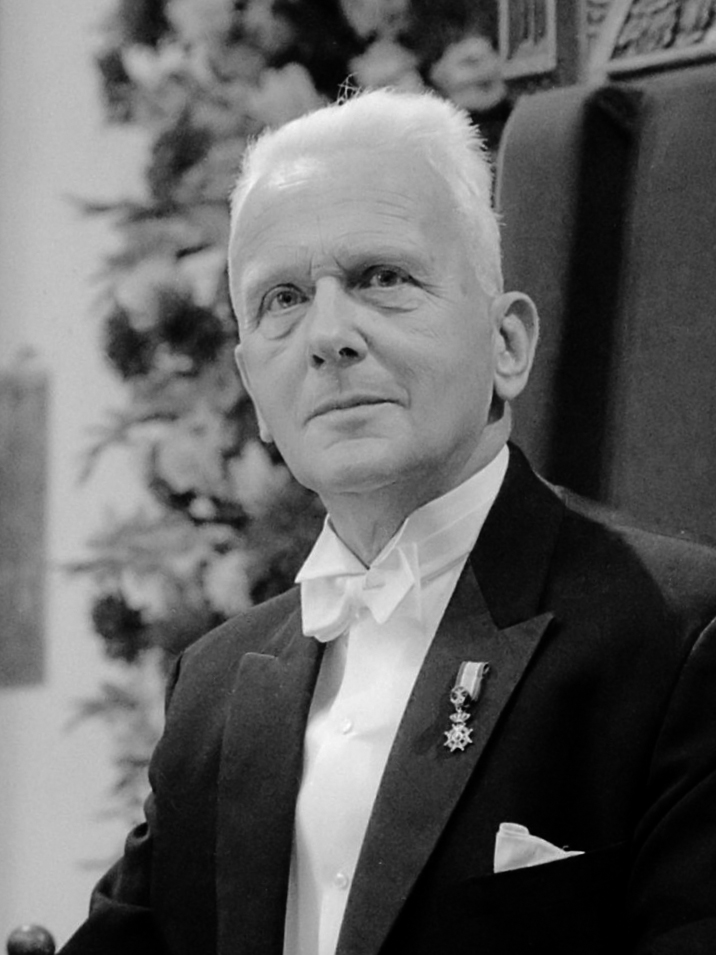
Mazure in 1966

Jannis Pieter Mazure (24 December 1899 – 3 November 1990) was a Dutch politician.

He was a member of the Labour Party (PvdA) and was considered to be very outspoken about his beliefs. He was president of the Senate from 1966 to 1969. He was preceded by Jan Anne Jonkman and was succeeded by his party colleague Maarten de Niet Gerritzoon.

== Decorations ==
- Netherlands: Commander of the Order of the Netherlands Lion
- Netherlands: Officer of the Order of Orange-Nassau

Political offices
Preceded by Jan Anne Jonkman	President of the Senate; 1966–1969	Succeeded by Maarten de Niet
