= Daniëlle Jansen =

Dutch politician (born 1970)

Minister for Health, Welfare and Sport
- In office 19 June 2025 – 22 August 2025
- Prime Minister: Dick Schoof
- Preceded by: Fleur Agema
- Succeeded by: Jan Anthonie Bruijn

Member of the House of Representatives
- In office 6 December 2023 – 18 June 2025

Personal details
- Born: 29 September 1970 (age 55) Tollebeek, Netherlands
- Party: New Social Contract

Daniëlle Jansen (born 29 September 1970) is a Dutch politician from the New Social Contract who was minister for health, welfare and sport between 19 June and 22 August 2025. She was elected to the Dutch Parliament in the 2023 Dutch general election where she served as her party's spokesperson for curative and preventive healthcare. She succeeded Eddy van Hijum as outgoing Minister for Health, Welfare and Sport after the PVV recalled all their Ministers from the cabinet Schoof.

== Bills in parliament ==
Together with Julian Bushoff (GL/PvdA), she presented a bill in May 2024 that would allow the Netherlands Authority for Consumers and Markets (ACM) to investigate and block takeovers of medical providers with a revenue of less than €30 million. This authority already existed for larger companies. The House later passed a motion by Jansen urging the cabinet to bring forward a regulation restricting the sale of cigarettes to tobacco shops from 2032 to 2028.

== Minister of Health, Welfare and Sport ==
On 19 June 2025, she was sworn in as Minister of Health, Welfare and Sport in the demissionary Schoof cabinet. This position came vacant after the Party for Freedom recalled all of their people from the cabinet. This led to Fleur Agema leaving her position as minister. Eddy van Hijum temporarily replaced Agema as minister, combining his tasks as Minister for Social Affairs and Employment with the tasks of the Minister for Health, Welfare and Sport. She had been nominated for the position after two weeks of discussions between the remaining coalition partners VVD, NSC and BBB.

== House committee assignments ==
- Temporary committee Fundamental rights and constitutional review (vice chair)
- Committee for Health, Welfare and Sport
- Contact group Germany

== Electoral history ==
Electoral history of Daniëlle Jansen
Year	Body	Party	Pos.	Votes	Result		Ref.
Year	Body	Party	Pos.	Votes	Party seats	Individual	Ref.
2023	House of Representatives	New Social Contract	14	6,188	20	Won	

== See also ==
- List of members of the House of Representatives of the Netherlands, 2023–2025
