= Albertus van Naamen van Eemnes =

Dutch politician and lawyer

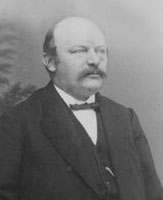

President of the Senate
- In office 17 September 1889 – 7 March 1902
- Preceded by: W.A.A.J. baron Schimmelpenninck van der Oye
- Succeeded by: Jan Elias Nicolaas Schimmelpenninck van der Oye

Personal details
- Born: 27 February 1828 Zwolle, Netherlands
- Died: 7 March 1902 (aged 74) The Hague, Netherlands

Mr. Albertus van Naamen van Eemnes (Zwolle, 27 February 1828 – The Hague, 7 March 1902) was a Dutch politician and lawyer.

He was a moderate liberal politician. He was first a lawyer in the city of Zwolle. In 1866, he was elected as a member of the House of Representatives. In 1879 he lost his seat, but a year later he became first a member of the Senate. In 1889 he succeeded W.A.A.J. baron Schimmelpenninck van der Oye as President of the senate. After his death, another member of the Schimmelpenninck-family (Jan Elias Nicolaas Schimmelpenninck van der Oye) moved to this post..

Preceded by W.A.A.J. baron Schimmelpenninck van der Oye	President of the Senate of the Netherlands; 1889–1902	Succeeded by Jan Elias Nicolaas Schimmelpenninck van der Oye
