= Jan Jonkman =

Dutch politician (1891–1976)

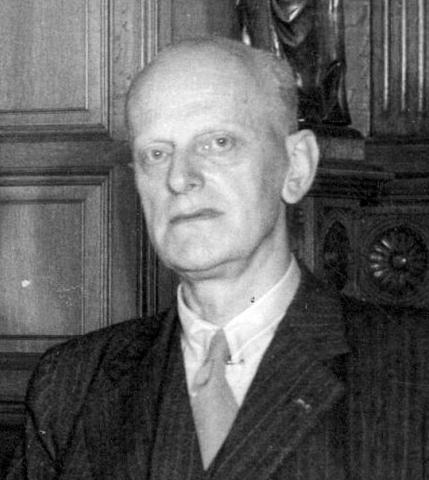
- Official portrait, 1946

President of the Senate
- In office 1 June 1951 – 20 September 1966
- Preceded by: Roelof Kranenburg
- Succeeded by: Jannes Pieter Mazure

Minister of Overseas Affairs
- In office 3 November 1947 – 7 August 1948
- Preceded by: Louis Beel
- Succeeded by: Maan Sassen
- In office 3 July 1946 – 30 August 1947
- Preceded by: Johann Logemann
- Succeeded by: Louis Beel

Personal details
- Born: 13 September 1891 Utrecht, Netherlands
- Died: 27 June 1976 (aged 66) The Hague, Netherlands
- Party: PvdA

Jan Anne Jonkman (13 September 1891 – 27 June 1976) was a Dutch politician of the Labour Party. He served as president of the Senate from 1951 to 1966, as well as minister of overseas affairs from 1946 to August 1947 and November 1947 to 1948. Previously, Jonkman had served in the Dutch East Indies as a prosecutor, and later member of the Volksraad from 1927 to 1931 and 1939 to 1942.

== Decorations ==
- Netherlands: Knight Grand Cross of the Order of the Netherlands Lion
- Netherlands: Commander of the Order of Orange-Nassau

Political offices
Preceded by Roelof Kranenburg	President of the Senate; 1951–1966	Succeeded by Jannes Pieter Mazure
