= Jan Anthonie Bruijn =

Dutch politician (born 1958)

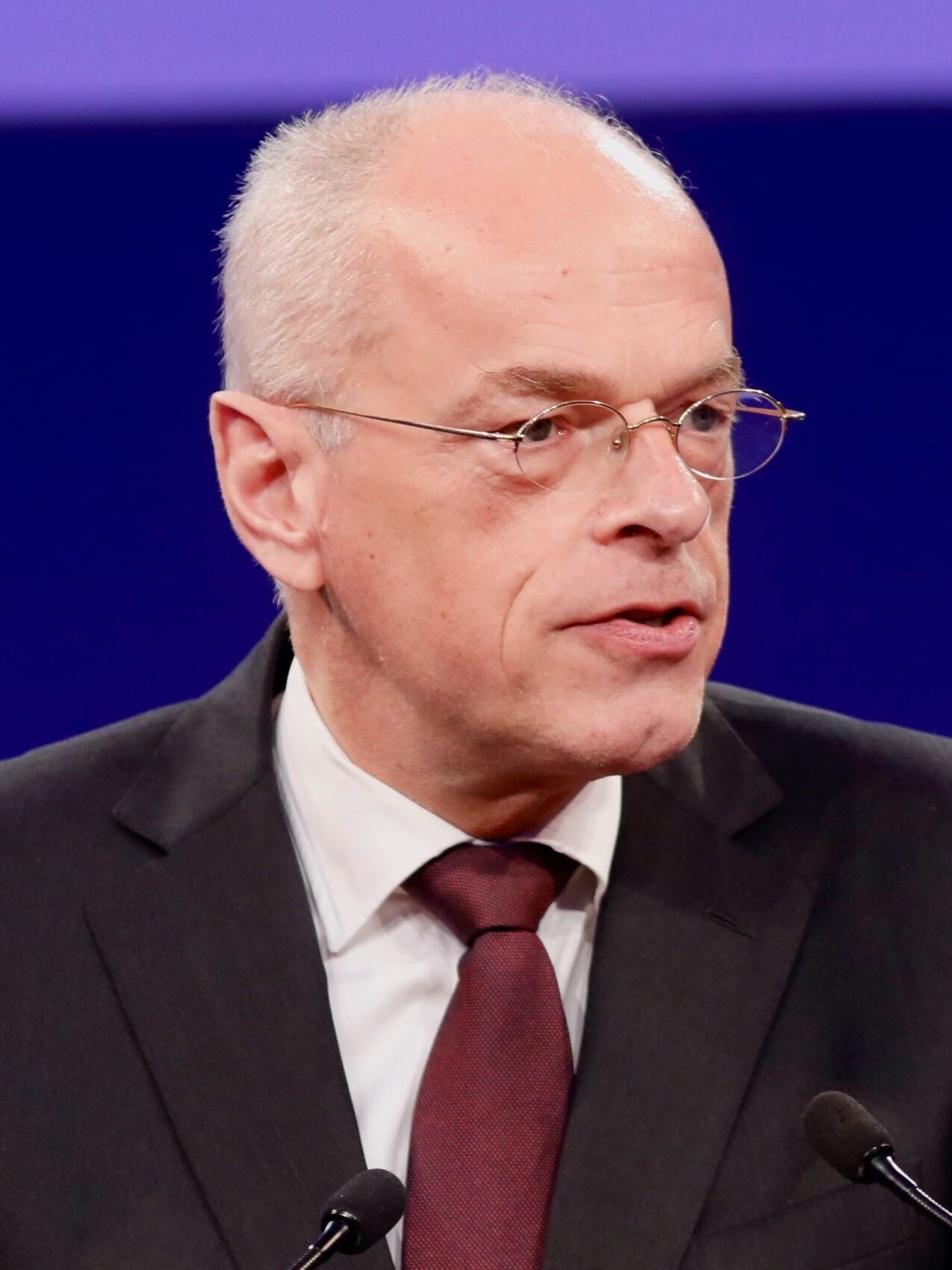
- Bruijn in 2023

Minister of Health, Welfare and Sport
- In office 5 September 2025 – 22 February 2026
- Prime Minister: Dick Schoof
- Preceded by: Daniëlle Jansen
- Succeeded by: Sophie Hermans

President of the Senate
- In office 2 July 2019 – 5 September 2025
- Preceded by: Ankie Broekers-Knol
- Succeeded by: Mei Li Vos

Member of the Senate
- In office 6 November 2012 – 5 September 2025
- Preceded by: Jos van Rey
- Succeeded by: Shirin Musa

Personal details
- Born: Jan Anthonie Bruijn; 7 February 1958 (age 68) The Hague, Netherlands
- Party: VVD (from 1982)
- Education: Johns Hopkins University; Erasmus University Rotterdam; Leiden University
- Occupation: Politician; physician; professor

Jan Anthonie Bruijn (born 7 February 1958) is a Dutch pathologist and politician. A member of the People's Party for Freedom and Democracy (VVD), he became a member of the Senate on 6 November 2012. He was president of the Senate between July 2019 and September 2025. Bruijn also worked as a professor of immunopathology at Leiden University. Between September 2025 and February 2026, he served as Minister of Health, Welfare and Sport in the Schoof cabinet.

== Honours ==
- Spain: Grand Cross of the Order of Civil Merit (9 April 2024)

Political offices
Preceded by Daniëlle Jansen	Minister of Health, Welfare and Sport; 2025–2026	Succeeded by Sophie Hermans
