= Liesbeth Baarveld-Schlaman =

Dutch politician

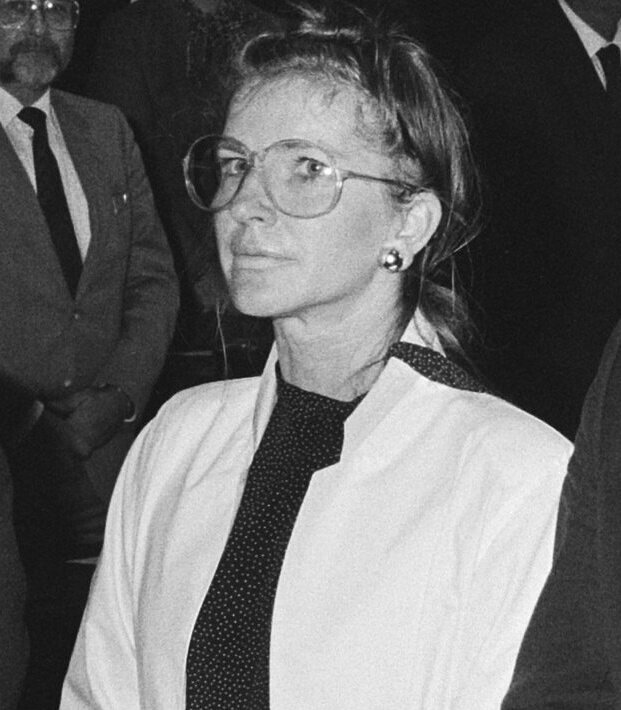

Senator in the Senate of the Netherlands
- In office 10 June 1981 – 13 June 1995

Personal details
- Born: 15 October 1934; Arnhem, Netherlands
- Died: 14 March 2012 (aged 77); Ermelo, Netherlands
- Political party: Democrats 66; Labour Party

Elisabeth Maria Petronella Baarveld-Schlaman (15 October 1934 – 14 March 2012) was a Dutch politician. She was a member of the Senate of the Netherlands from 1981 to 1995, a member of the Parliamentary Assembly of the Council of Europe and vice-chairperson of the Defense Committee of the Western European Union. She was a member of the Democrats 66 and the Labour Party.

== Early life ==
Baarveld-Schlaman was born on 15 October 1934 in Arnhem. She grew up in a Roman Catholic working class family. Her parents were Petrus Lambertus Maria Schlaman, a bus driver, and Wilhelmina Bernardina Kuster. She had an older sister and two younger brothers, one of whom died in infancy. She received a master's degree in German, and began work as an executive secretary at a hospital in Arnhem. On 8 June 1964, she married Willem Geert Baarveld, an engineer.

== Political career ==
Baarveld-Schlaman joined the Democrats 66 (D66) in 1966, the same year that the party was formed. She joined the executive committee in the early 1970s. She and her husband moved to Lelystad, where her husband began work as an engineer with the Rijksdienst voor de IJsselmeerpolders. She stood for election in the municipal council elections in 1971 with the public body Openbaar Lichaam Zuidelijke IJsselmeerpolders as a candidate for the Progressive Accord (PAK), an alliance between D66, the Labour Party (PvdA) and the Political Party of Radicals (PPR). She was elected to the council and from 1972 to 1975, she was also a member of the executive advisory board with a portfolio of social affairs and health care.

She resigned her membership in the D66 shortly after the 1974 congress where a majority voted in favour of dissolving the party. Instead she joined the PvdA. She ran for election with the PvdA in the 1976 local election but she only came in fourth place. Baarveld-Schlaman transitioned from local politics to national party politics. She served as the international secretary of the Rooie Vrouwen in de PvdA from 1977 to 1981. She was determined to build women's political power.

=== Senate career (1981 – 1995) ===
Baarveld-Schlaman and her husband moved to Ermelo in the early 1980s. She was elected to the Senate on 10 June 1981 as a representative for the PvdA. She was focused on foreign policy and defense, particularly human rights violations and the threat of nuclear war. She spoke about the fear of nuclear war in her maiden speech in the Senate. She served as the first spokeswoman for foreign affairs for the PvdA Senate group and chairwoman of the foreign affairs standing committee in the Senate. She was the substitute member for the Parliamentary Assembly of the Council of Europe from 30 September 1981 to 1 January 1984 and from 1 October 1987 to 28 June 1992 and a member from 28 June 1992 to 25 September 1995 and vice-chairperson of the Defense Committee of the Western European Union. She was the rapporteur on human rights in the Middle East. Baarveld-Schlaman met with a number of leading figures in international politics throughout her career, including Yasser Arafat, George H. W. Bush, José Napoleón Duarte, Alexander Dubcĕk and Hosni Mubarak.

She was also involved in the Ministry of Transport and Water Management. Baarveld-Schlaman spoke on behalf of her group in 1992 during the discussion of the bill to approve the Maastricht Treaty. She also rejected the participation of Dutch frigates in the Gulf War and was one of twelve members of her group who spoke out against military action in Iraq. In 1985, she was in the minority of her party for voting in favour of the Scientific Education Act 1981. In 1990, the PvdA group in the Senate nominated Baarveld-Schlaman as its candidate for the first female President of the Senate but the party leadership instead supported Herman Tjeenk Willink. As a result, she withdrew her candidacy.

In 1994, Baarveld-Schlaman was appointed Knight of the Order of the Netherlands Lion and in 1995 she received the Pro Merito Medal from the Parliamentary Assembly of the Council of Europe. She was a self-confident woman who sometimes stood out because of her exuberant clothing. She left office on 13 June 1995.

== Later life ==
Baarveld-Schlaman died on 14 March 2012 in Ermelo at the age of 77. She was commemorated on 17 April 2012 in the Senate.
