= Mei Li Vos =

Dutch politician (born 1970)

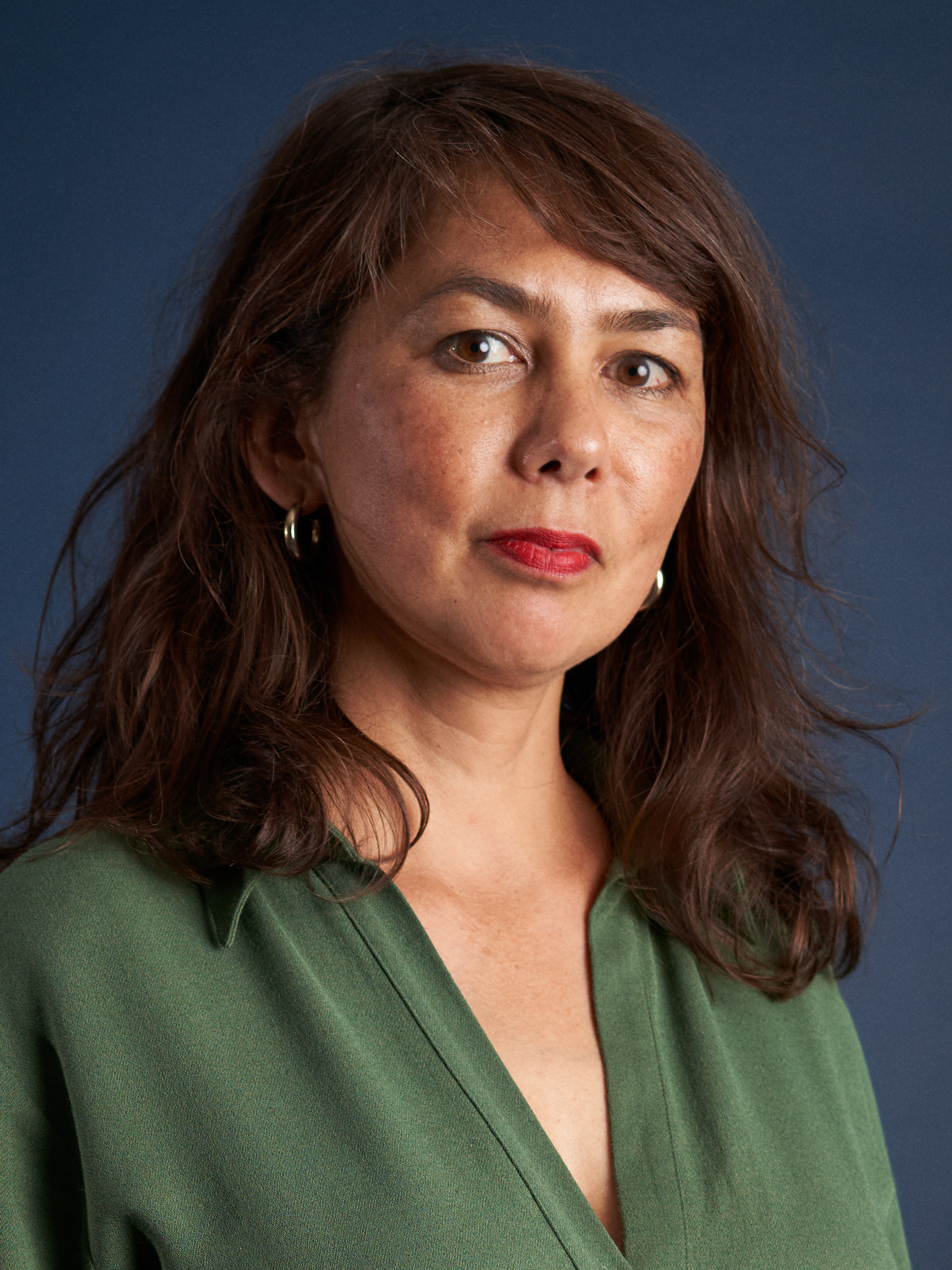
- Vos in 2022

President of the Senate
- Incumbent
- Assumed office 7 October 2025
- Preceded by: Jan Anthonie Bruijn

Member of the Senate
- Incumbent
- Assumed office 11 June 2019

Member of the House of Representatives
- In office 20 September 2012 – 23 March 2017
- In office 1 March 2007 – 17 June 2010

Personal details
- Born: 31 March 1970 (age 56) Eindhoven, Netherlands
- Party: PvdA (2002–2026); PRO (since 2026)
- Other political affiliations: GroenLinks (since 2023)
- Education: University of Amsterdam (PhD)
- Occupation: Trade unionist • Editorialist • Politician

Mei Li Vos (Dutch pronunciation: [mɛiˌli ˈvɔs]; born 31 March 1970) is a Dutch politician, former trade unionist and editorialist. A member of Progressief Nederland (PRO), and formerly of the Labour Party (PvdA), she was a member of the House of Representatives from 1 March 2007 to 17 June 2010 and again from 20 September 2012 until 23 March 2017. She has been a member of the Senate since 11 June 2019, serving as parliamentary leader of the PvdA group until 2023, as First Vice-President of the Senate from 2023 until 2025, and as President of the Senate since 2025.

== Early life ==
Mei Li Vos was born on 31 March 1970 in Eindhoven, the only sister among six siblings. Her mother was Chinese Indonesian, having grown up in the Dutch East Indies. During her youth her family lived in a Christian commune in Veldhoven. Between 1982 and 1988 she attended the VWO at the Christian Lyceum in Arnhem.

== Academic career ==
Between 1988 and 1989 she studied General Social Science at the University of Utrecht. Vos studied political science at the University of Amsterdam. Between 1994 and 2002 she worked as teacher and researcher at the political science department of the University of Amsterdam. In 1994-1995 she also worked part-time as manager of the Maarten Altena Ensemble. From 1995 to 2000 she worked on her thesis, which concerned the relationship between The Netherlands and Indonesia. She specifically researched what the effect was of Indonesia refusing development cooperation of the Netherlands on cooperation in higher education, industry and the legal profession. Her thesis is titled "International cooperation between politics and practice: how Dutch Indonesian cooperation changed remarkably little after a diplomatic rupture".

Since 2000 she also worked part-time as a researcher at the think tank Infodrome, where she wrote a study on the information revolution and its effect on society. Based on her work here she published two books on the information society. In 2001 she was promoted there at the Political Science department. Between 2002 and 2004 she worked at United Knowledge, where she advised the government on the information society. Based on her work advising the Ministry of Economic Affairs she published a book on empowerment. Between 2004 and 2005 she worked at the Ministry of General Affairs and the government PR service. As such she coordinated the norms-and-values cabinet project.

== Alternative for Trade Union ==
In 2005 she was one of the founders of the Alternative for Trade Union (Alternatief voor Vakbond, AVV), a trade union specifically oriented at young people, part-time employed, freelancers, with temporary work and people on a flexible contract. The union was founded as an alternative for the FNV, which was, according to AVV-founders too concerned with the interest of elderly workers. In 2005 she became the union's chair. Additionally she got a column with the Vrij Nederland and the de Volkskrant. She also worked for the Ministry of Justice as a researcher on the relationship between migration, integration and the welfare state. In 2006 she published a book "the workers' paradise" on the future of the welfare state, employment and labour.

== Political career ==
In the 2006 elections Vos was placed on place 38 of the list of the PvdA. Both the conservative liberal VVD and the progressive liberal D66 had asked Vos to consider running for them. Because of the PvdA did not perform particularly well in the elections, Vos was not elected immediately. When several MPs became minister in the fourth Balkenende cabinet Vos did get a seat. Vos was spokesperson on freelancer, temporarily employed and consumer affairs. She sat on the commissions on finance, European Affairs, Economic Affairs, Social Affairs and the Environment. Vos also was member of the board of directors of the public radio broadcaster FunX. As an MP she wanted to give freelancers and the temporarily employed a voice in parliament and share the risks of a dynamic labour market more equally between free lancers, part-time employed and temporarily employed and people with a fixed contract. Vos considers herself to be a social liberal, while the PvdA is a social-democratic party.

Her term in the House ended on 23 March 2017.

She was lead candidate of the PvdA in the 2019 Senate election. She has been a member of the Senate since 11 June 2019, serving as parliamentary leader. As of 2024, she was training to become a primary school teacher alongside, as an intern at a school in Amsterdam-West. As first vice president of the Senate, Vos became acting president on 5 September 2025 following Jan Anthonie Bruijn's resignation. On 7 October, she was elected as Bruijn's permanent successor, obtaining 39 votes in the second round to Tanja Klip-Martin's 33 votes.

== Personal life ==
Vos attends the English Reformed Church, Amsterdam, affiliated to the Church of Scotland and the Protestant Church in the Netherlands. In an interview, she called religion a human invention, but she said that she needed faith for contemplation and that she hoped that a higher power exists.

Political offices
Preceded by Jan Anthonie Bruijn	President of the Senate; 2025–present	Incumbent
