= Theo Thurlings =

Dutch economist and politician

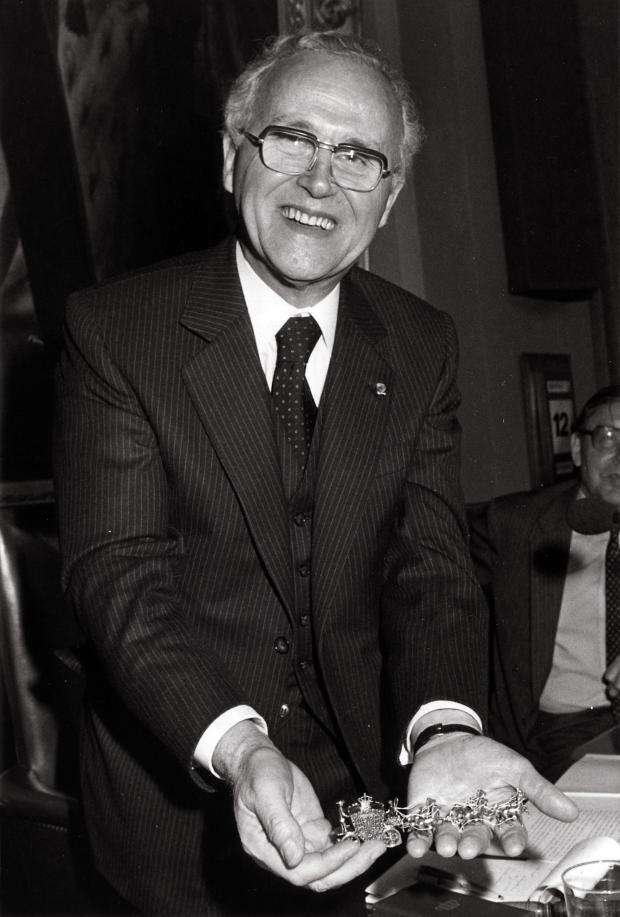
Thurlings in 1983

Theodorus Lambertus Mathis Thurlings (24 December 1916 – 10 September 1997) was a Dutch economist and politician.

He was a member of the CDA. He was president of the Dutch Senate from 1973 till 1983. He was preceded Maarten de Niet Gerritzoon and was succeeded by Piet Steenkamp.

== Decorations ==
- Netherlands: Knight Grand Cross of the Order of the Netherlands Lion
- Netherlands: Officer of the Order of Orange-Nassau

Political offices
Preceded by Maarten de Niet	President of the Senate; 1973–1983	Succeeded by Piet Steenkamp
