= Jan Elias Nicolaas Schimmelpenninck van der Oye =

Dutch politician

Jan Elias Nicolaas, Baron Schimmelpenninck van der Oye
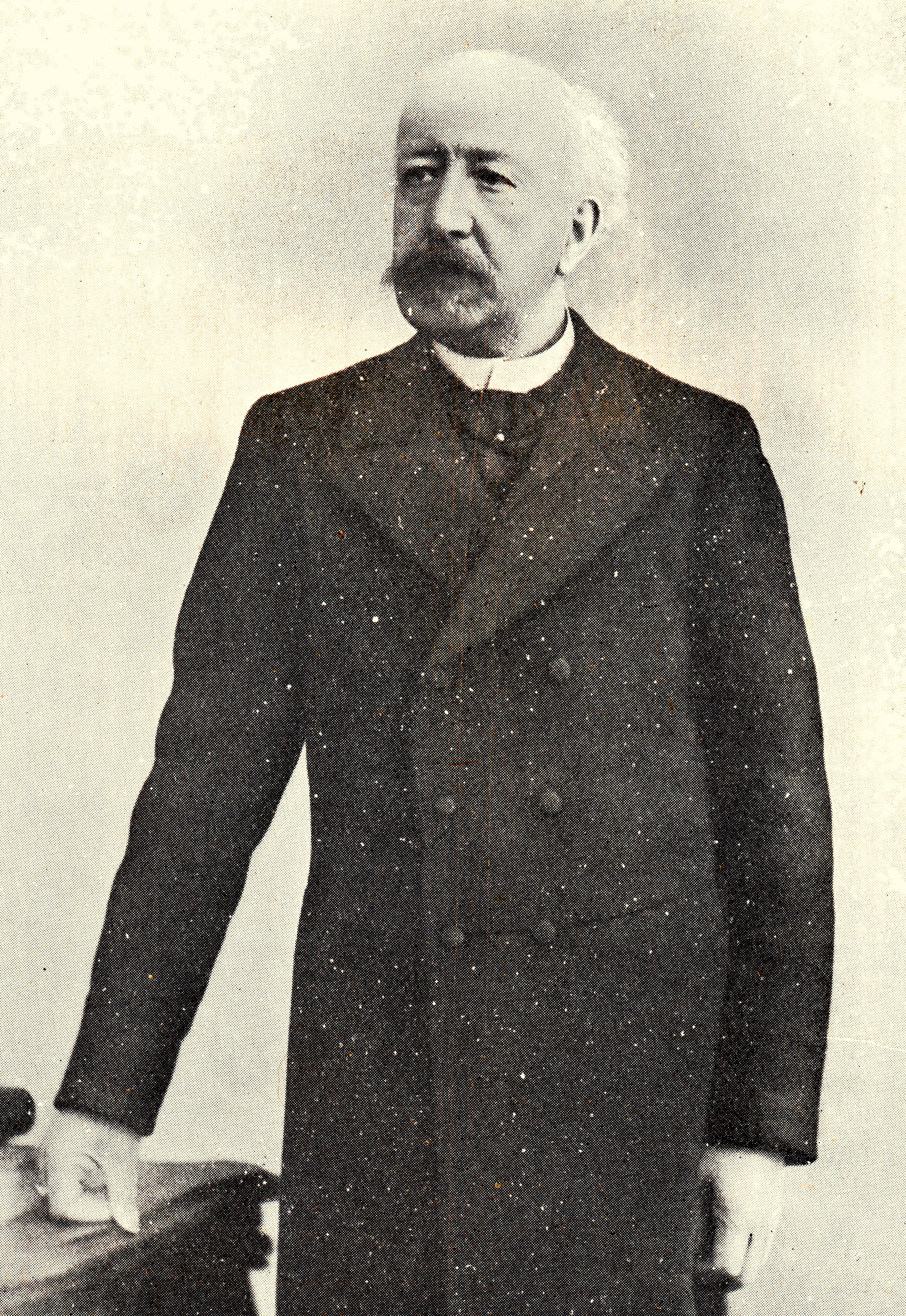

President of the Senate
- In office 20 September 1904 – 11 April 1914
- Preceded by: Albertus van Naamen van Eemnes
- Succeeded by: Jan Joseph Godfried van Voorst tot Voorst

Personal details
- Born: 12 August 1836 Brummen, Netherlands
- Died: 11 April 1914 (aged 77) The Hague, Netherlands
- Party: Christian Historical (from 1903); Free Anti-Revolutionary (1897–1903); Anti-Revolutionary (until 1894)

Jan Elias Nicolaas, Baron Schimmelpenninck van der Oye (12 August 1836 – 11 April 1914) was a Dutch politician.

Schimmelpenninck van der Oye was a general of military engineering who, as a member of the Anti-Revolutionary Party, became both a member of the member of the House of Representatives and of the Senate. He served as President of the Senate between 1902 and 1914. He was preceded by Albertus van Naamen van Eemnes and was in turn succeeded by Jan Joseph Godfried van Voorst tot Voorst.

== Honours ==
- Netherlands – Officer of the Order of the Oak Crown (1880)
- Netherlands – Knight of the Order of the Netherlands Lion (1887)
- Netherlands – Knight Grand Cross of the Order of the Netherlands Lion (1909)

House of Representatives of the Netherlands
Preceded by Jacob Nicolaas Bastert	Member for Utrecht; 1884–1888; With: Joan Röell 1884–1886; Æneas Mackay 1886–1888	Succeeded by August Seyffardt
Preceded by Frederik van Bylandt; Levinus Keuchenius	Member for Amersfoort; 1888–1894	Succeeded by Francis David Schimmelpenninck
Political offices
Preceded by Albertus van Naamen van Eemnes	President of the Senate; 1902–1914	Succeeded by Jan van Voorst tot Voorst
