= Willem Lodewijk de Vos van Steenwijk =

Dutch politician

His Excellency Willem Lodewijk, Baron de Vos van Steenwijk
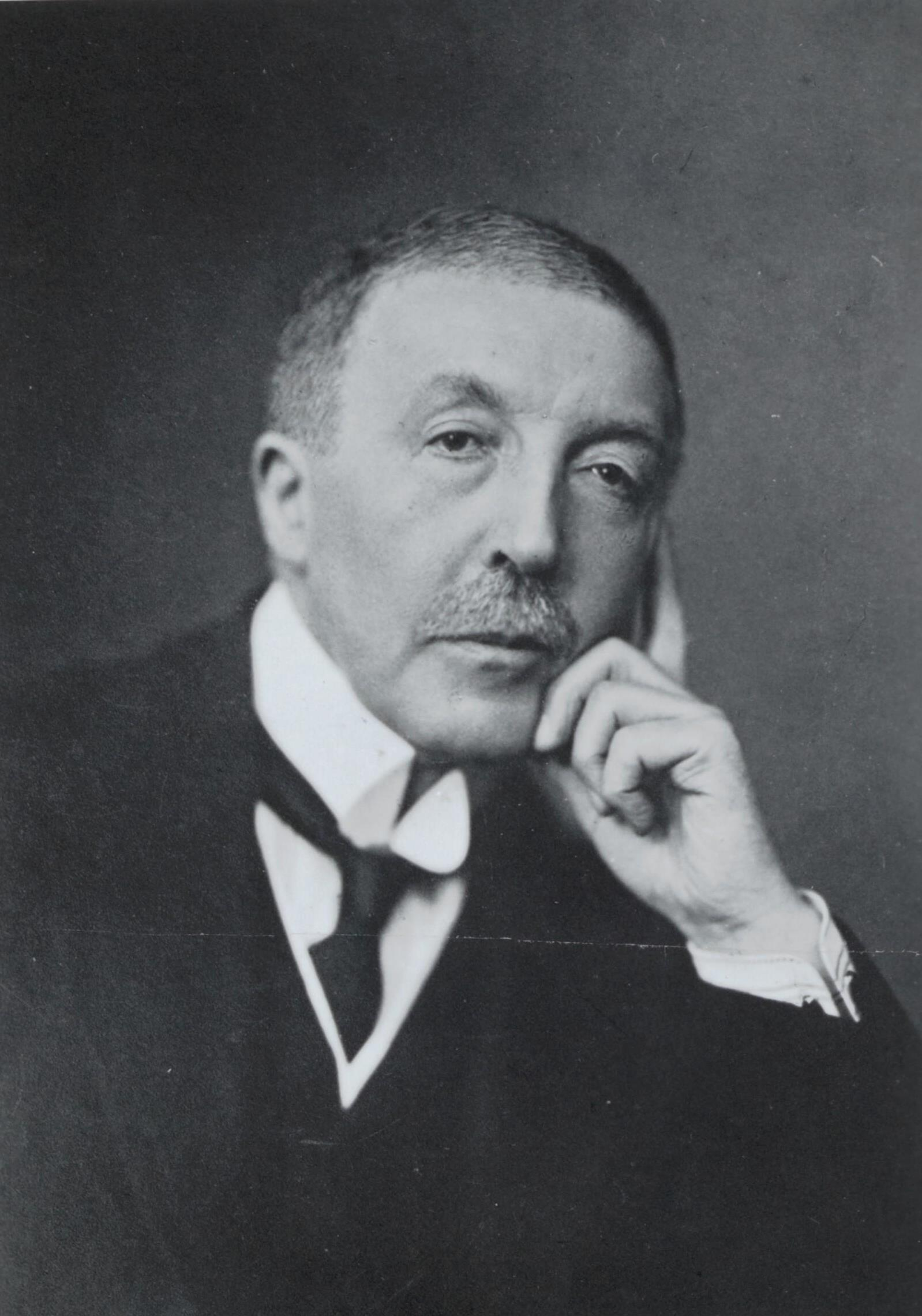
- De Vos van Steenwijk in the 1920s

President of the Senate
- In office 17 September 1929 – 23 July 1946
- Preceded by: Jan Joseph Godfried, Baron van Voorst tot Voorst
- Succeeded by: Roelof Kranenburg

Personal details
- Born: 10 July 1859 Dalfsen, Netherlands
- Died: 17 September 1947 (aged 88) The Hague, Netherlands
- Party: Christian Historical
- Spouse: Ferdinanda Anna van Naamen (m. 1889)
- Education: Leiden University

Willem Lodewijk, Baron de Vos van Steenwijk (10 July 1859 – 12 April 1947) was a conservative Dutch politician.

He was a son of Jan Arend Godert de Vos van Steenwijk, who was president of the senate of the Netherlands from 1874 until 1880. He was a member of the Christelijk Historische Unie (CHU) and president of Senate from 1929 to 1946. He was preceded by Jan Joseph Godfried van Voorst tot Voorst and was in turn succeeded by the socialist Roelof Kranenburg.

== Honours ==
De Vos van Steenwijk has received the following honours:

- Netherlands: Knight Grand Cross of the Order of the Netherlands Lion

Political offices
Preceded by Jan Joseph Godfried, Baron van Voorst tot Voorst	President of the Senate; 1929–1946	Succeeded by Roelof Kranenburg
