= Jan Joseph Godfried van Voorst tot Voorst (politician) =

Dutch politician

Jan Joseph Godfried, Baron van Voorst tot Voorst
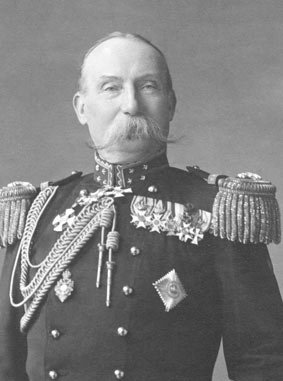

President of the Senate
- In office 12 May 1914 – 17 September 1929
- Preceded by: Jan Elias Nicolaas, Baron Schimmelpenninck van der Oye
- Succeeded by: Willem Lodewijk, Baron de Vos van Steenwijk

Personal details
- Born: 16 September 1846 Elden, Netherlands
- Died: 17 January 1931 (aged 84) Arnhem, Netherlands
- Party: Roman Catholic State Party

Jan Joseph Godfried, Baron van Voorst tot Voorst Sr. (16 September 1846 – 17 January 1931) was a Dutch politician and lieutenant-general of the Dutch army.

He was a member of the RKSP and was President of the Senate between 1914 and 1929. He was preceded by Jan Elias Nicolaas Schimmelpenninck van der Oye and was succeeded by Willem Lodewijk de Vos van Steenwijk.

== Decorations ==
Tot Voorst received the following decorations:

- Netherlands: Knight of the Order of Orange-Nassau
- Netherlands: Knight Grand Cross of the Order of the Netherlands Lion
- France: Officier of the French Légion d'honneur
- Denmark: Knight of the Order of the Dannebrog
- Prussia: Knight of the Order of the Crown (Prussia)
- Italy: Commander of the Order of the Crown of Italy
- Austria-Hungary: Commander of the Order of Franz Joseph
- Sweden: Commander of the Order of the Sword

Political offices
Preceded by Jan Elias Nicolaas, Baron Schimmelpenninck van der Oye	President of the Senate; 1914–1929	Succeeded by Willem Lodewijk, Baron de Vos van Steenwijk
