= Jan Achterstraat =

Dutch politician (1928–2026)

Member of the Senate of the Netherlands
- In office 16 September 1980 – 1 April 1983

Personal details
- Born: 13 July 1928 Barneveld, Netherlands
- Died: 12 June 2026 (aged 97) Badhoevedorp, Netherlands
- Party: ARP (1958–1980); CDA (after 1980)
- Education: Utrecht University; Delft University of Technology
- Occupation: Civil servant

Jan Achterstraat (13 July 1928 – 12 June 2026) was a Dutch politician. A member of the Anti-Revolutionary Party and the Christian Democratic Appeal, he served in the Senate from 1980 to 1983.

Achterstraat died in Badhoevedorp on 12 June 2026, at the age of 97.
