= Ambt Vollenhove =

Former municipality in Overijssel, Netherlands

Coordinates: 52°41′N 5°59′E

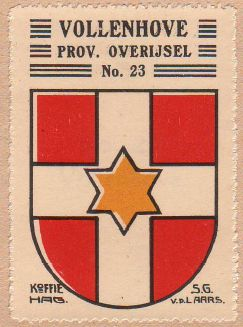
Coat of arms of Ambt Vollenhove (Netherlands)

Ambt Vollenhove is a former municipality in the Dutch province of Overijssel. It consisted of the countryside surrounding the city of Vollenhove, which was a separate municipality.

Ambt Vollenhove existed from 1818 to 1942 when it became a part of Vollenhove.
