= President of the Senate (Netherlands) =

Elected member leading the meetings of the Senate of the Netherlands

Chairman of the First Chamber of the States General
- Voorzitter van de Eerste Kamer der Staten-Generaal
- Coat of arms of the Senate

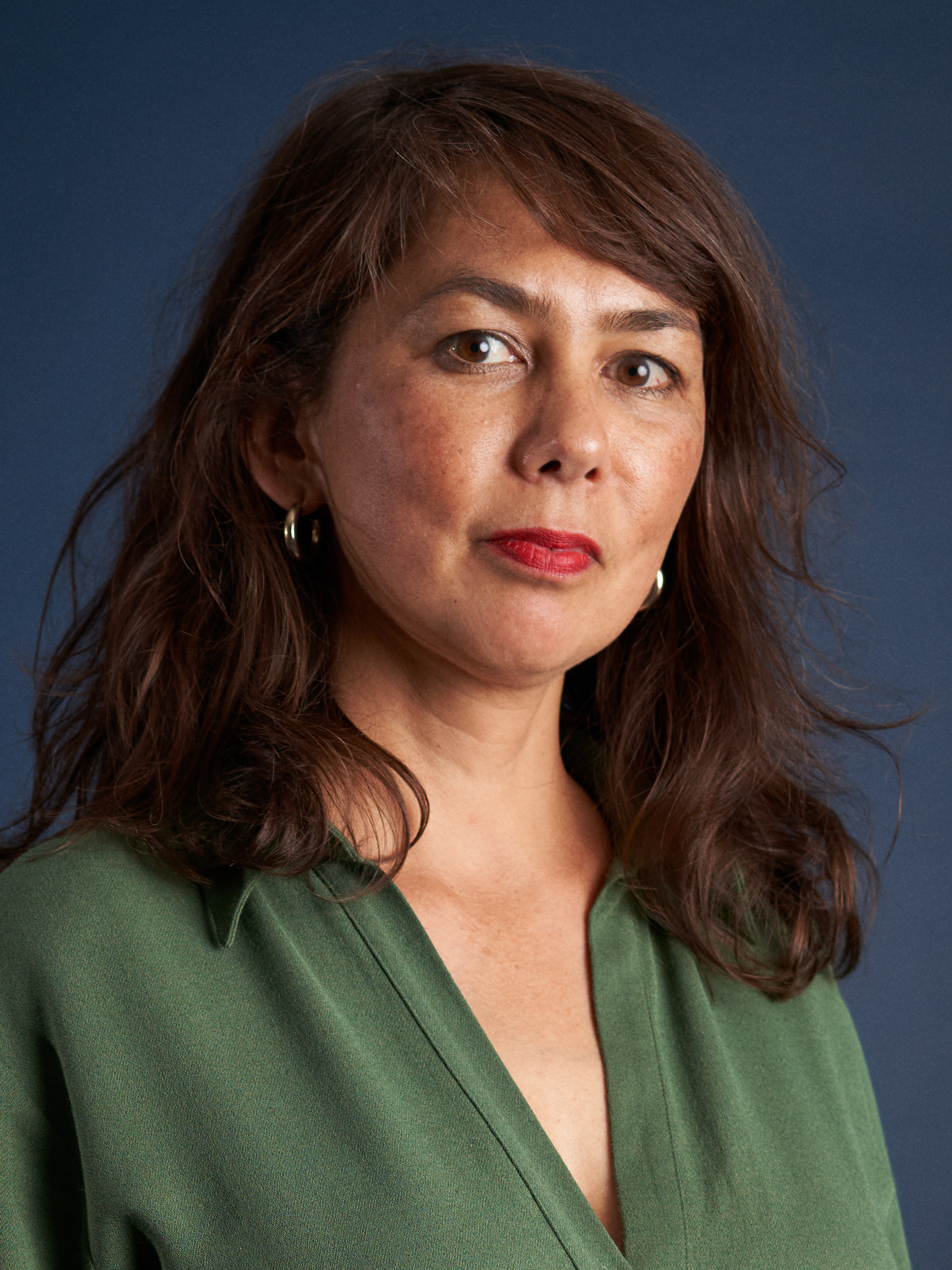
- Incumbent; Mei Li Vos since 7 October 2025
- Style: Mr President (within the Senate); His Excellency (diplomatic)
- Member of: Presidium of the Senate
- Term length: No term limit
- Constituting instrument: Constitution of the Netherlands
- Formation: 21 September 1815; 210 years ago
- First holder: Charles Thiennes de Lombise
- Deputy: Deputy Speaker
- Salary: €126,975.48 annually (including €7,887.24 expenses)

The president of the Senate (Dutch: Voorzitter van de Eerste Kamer der Staten-Generaal) is one of the 75 members of the Senate of the Netherlands and is elected to lead its meetings and be its representative. The officeholder also chairs the Internal Committee (Huishoudelijke Commissie), the Committee of Senior Members (College van Senioren) as well as the joint sessions of both houses of the States General, the so-called Verenigde Vergadering.

Mei Li Vos has been serving as President since 7 October 2025.

== Name ==
Although the office is officially called the "President of the Senate" in English, it is not a direct translation of its official Dutch name, the "Chairman of the First Chamber of the States General", "Chairman of the First Chamber" or more colloquially just the "Chairman".

== See also ==
- List of presidents of the Senate (Netherlands)
- Speaker of the House of Representatives (Netherlands)
