= List of members of the Senate of the Netherlands, 2023–2027 =

Senate of the Netherlands, 2023–2027
←	2019–2023

Overview
- Legislative body: Senate
- Term: 13 June 2023 –
- Election: 2023 Senate election
- Members: 75
- President: Jan Anthonie Bruijn (until 2025); Mei Li Vos (from 2025)

Since 13 June 2023, 89 individuals have served as representatives in the Senate, the 75-seat upper house of the States-General of the Netherlands. After the 30 May 2023 Senate election, 75 members were elected and installed at the start of the term. There were 12 replacements during the term, some of them temporary. Jan Anthonie Bruijn was elected as President of the Senate at the start of the time. When he left in 2025, Mei Li Vos was elected as President of the Senate.

At the start of the term, the Farmer–Citizen Movement (BBB) was the largest party with 16 seats. GroenLinks (GL, 7 seats) and the Labour Party (PvdA, 7 seats) formed a joint parliamentary group at the start. The parliamentary group was named GroenLinks-PvdA and in 2026 renamed Progressief Nederland (Pro). The other parties in the Senate at the start of the term were People's Party for Freedom and Democracy (VVD, 10 seats), Christian Democratic Appeal (CDA, 6 seats), Democrats 66 (D66, 5 seats), Party for Freedom (PVV, 6 seats), Party for the Animals (PvdD, 3 seats), JA21 (3 seats), Socialist Party (SP, 3 seats), Christian Union (CU, 3 seats), Forum for Democracy (FvD, 3 seats), Volt (2 seats), Reformed Political Party (SGP, 2 seats), 50Plus (50+, 1 seat) and Independent Politics Netherlands (OPNL, 1 seat).

During the term, several members switched their parliamentary group affiliation, changing the party composition of the Senate. Eric Kemperman left BBB in May 2025 and continued as an independent until he joined FvD in September 2025. Robert Croll left BBB to join D66 in June 2025, and was later joined by Arie Griffioen in November 2025. Pim Walenkamp was not allowed to join the BBB group when he returned to the Senate in September 2025. Cees van de Sanden left VVD in October 2025. A conflict within the PvdD parliamentary group led to Ingrid Visseren-Hamakers leaving and continuing as independent, although Peter Nicolaï and Niko Koffeman were no longer member of the party. Toine Beukering entered the Senate as replacement on the JA21 candidate list in November 2025, but didn't join the parliamentary group. In March 2026, Robert van Gasteren was expelled from the BBB parliamentary group, after he cancelled his party membership, and continued as an independent. Because of these changes, this term had a record twenty parliamentary groups.

== List ==
Name	Group	Residence	Assumed office	Term end	Ref.
Lies van Aelst	SP	Gorinchem	13 February 2024		
Willemijn Aerdts	D66	The Hague	13 June 2023	22 February 2026	
Bastiaan van Apeldoorn	SP	Haarlem	13 June 2023		
Janny Bakker-Klein	CDA	Huizen	13 June 2023		
Pim van Ballekom	VVD	Lasne (BE)	13 June 2023		
Ruben Baumgarten	JA21	Amersfoort	13 June 2023		
Fatimazhra Belhirch	D66	Rotterdam	13 June 2023	10 November 2025	
Caspar van den Berg	VVD	The Hague	13 June 2023	10 September 2024	
Toine Beukering	Beukering (Note: Elected on the JA21 candidate list)	The Hague	18 November 2025		
Ilse Bezaan	PVV	Blaricum	13 June 2023		
Karin van Bijsterveld	JA21	Soest	13 June 2023		
Theo Bovens	CDA	Maastricht	13 June 2023		
Jan Anthonie Bruijn	VVD	Wassenaar	13 June 2023	5 September 2025 (Note: Left to become minister of health, welfare and sport)	
Robert Croll	BBB (Note: Until 2 June 2025)	Laren	13 June 2023		
Robert Croll	D66 (Note: From 3 June 2025)	Laren	13 June 2023		
Ferd Crone	GL/PvdA (Note: Until 10 September 2026, because of a rename)	Haarlem	13 June 2023		
Ferd Crone	Pro (Note: Starting 10 September 2026, because of a rename)	Haarlem	13 June 2023		
Johan Dessing	FvD	Zaandam	13 June 2023		
Diederik van Dijk	SGP	Benthuizen	13 June 2023	5 December 2023 (Note: Left to join the House of Representatives.)	
Boris Dittrich	D66	Amsterdam	13 June 2023		
Hugo Doornhof	CDA	Bussum	13 June 2023		
Marjolein Faber	PVV	Hoevelaken	13 June 2023	5 December 2023	
Mary Fiers	GL/PvdA	Esbeek	13 June 2023		
Mary Fiers	Pro	Esbeek	13 June 2023		
Robert van Gasteren	BBB (Note: Until 31 March 2026)	Bergschenhoek	11 July 2023		
Robert van Gasteren	Van Gasteren (Note: From 31 March 2026)	Bergschenhoek	11 July 2023		
Paulien Geerdink	VVD	Groningen	13 June 2023	20 June 2023 (Note: Went on sick leave.)	
Paulien Geerdink	VVD	Groningen	11 October 2023	31 June 2025	
Math Goossen	BBB	Melick	13 June 2023		
Auke van der Goot	OPNL	Groningen	13 June 2023		
Arie Griffioen	BBB (Note: Until 27 November 2025)	Zandvoort	13 June 2023		
Arie Griffioen	D66 (Note: From 28 November 2025)	Zandvoort	13 June 2023		
Roel van Gurp	GL/PvdA	Tilburg	13 June 2023		
Roel van Gurp	Pro	Tilburg	13 June 2023		
Eddy Hartog	Volt	Woluwe-Saint-Lambert (BE)	13 June 2023		
Alexander van Hattem	PVV	Vinkel	13 June 2023		
Eugène Heijnen	BBB	Margraten	13 June 2023	5 September 2025 (Note: Left to join the cabinet)	
Eric Holterhues	CU	Utrecht	13 June 2023		
Tineke Huizinga	CU	Heerenveen	13 June 2023		
Rik Janssen	SP	Wassenaar	13 June 2023		
Hetty Janssen-van Helvoort	GL/PvdA	Leeuwarden	13 June 2023		
Hetty Janssen-van Helvoort	Pro	Leeuwarden	13 June 2023		
Wim Jaspers	BBB	Someren	13 June 2023		
Marian Kaljouw	VVD	Buurmalsen	13 June 2023		
Antoon Kanis	D66	Arnhem	18 November 2025		
Meryem Karaaslan-Kilic	D66		24 February 2026		
Farah Karimi	GL/PvdA	The Hague	13 June 2023		
Farah Karimi	Pro	The Hague	13 June 2023		
Eric Kemperman	BBB (Note: Until 20 May 2025)	Scherpenzeel	13 June 2023		
Eric Kemperman	Kemperman (Note: From 20 May 2025 until 9 September 2025)	Scherpenzeel	13 June 2023		
Eric Kemperman	FvD (Note: From 9 September 2025)	Scherpenzeel	13 June 2023		
Ton van Kesteren	PVV	Groningen	12 December 2023		
Tanja Klip-Martin	VVD	Hilvarenbeek	13 June 2023		
Jan Klopman	BBB	Biddinghuizen	13 June 2023	4 July 2023	
Saskia Kluit-Sledsens	GL/PvdA	Utrecht	13 June 2023		
Saskia Kluit-Sledsens	Pro	Utrecht	13 June 2023		
Frans van Knapen	BBB	Harderwijk	13 June 2023		
Niko Koffeman	PvdD	Vierhouten	13 June 2023		
Tiny Kox	SP	Tilburg	13 June 2023	13 February 2024 (Note: Stepped down.)	
Bart Kroon	BBB	Amerongen	13 June 2023		
Ilona Lagas	BBB	Vinkenbuurt	13 June 2023		
Andrea van Langen-Visbeek	BBB	Andijk	13 June 2023		
Robbert Lievense	BBB	Zierikzee	7 February 2024		
Marjolein van der Linden	VVD	Hilversum	14 January 2025		
Henk Marquart Scholtz	BBB	Haren	13 June 2023		
Randy Martens	GL/PvdA	Groningen	13 June 2023		
Randy Martens	Pro	Groningen	13 June 2023		
Paul van Meenen	D66	Leiden	20 June 2023		
Henk Jan Meijer	VVD	Zwolle	13 June 2023		
Carla Moonen	D66	Breda	13 June 2023		
Shirin Musa	VVD	Rotterdam	23 September 2025		
Annabel Nanninga	JA21	Amsterdam	13 June 2023	6 November 2025	
Peter Nicolaï	PvdD	Amsterdam	13 June 2023		
Joris van den Oetelaar	FvD	Schijndel	13 June 2023		
Gert-Jan Oplaat	BBB	Markelo	13 June 2023		
Tekke Panman	BBB	The Hague	13 June 2023		
Gaby Perin-Gopie	Volt	The Hague	13 June 2023		
Koen Petersen	VVD	Amsterdam	13 June 2023		
Greet Prins-Modderaar	CDA	Nieuwkoop	13 June 2023	24 April 2026 (Note: Died in office)	
Artie Ramsodit	GL/PvdA	Haarlem	13 June 2023		
Artie Ramsodit	Pro	Haarlem	13 June 2023		
Jeroen Recourt	GL/PvdA	Haarlem	13 June 2023		
Jeroen Recourt	Pro	Haarlem	13 June 2023		
Theo Rietkerk	CDA	Kampen	13 June 2023		
Martin van Rooijen	50+	Oegstgeest	13 June 2023		
Daan Roovers	GL/PvdA	Amsterdam	13 June 2023		
Daan Roovers	Pro	Amsterdam	13 June 2023		
Paul Rosenmöller	GL/PvdA	Driebergen-Rijsenburg	13 June 2023		
Paul Rosenmöller	Pro	Driebergen-Rijsenburg	13 June 2023		
Cees van de Sanden	VVD (Note: Until 8 October 2025)	's-Hertogenbosch	27 June 2023	10 October 2023	
Cees van de Sanden	VVD	's-Hertogenbosch	24 September 2024		
Cees van de Sanden	Van de Sanden (Note: Since 8 October 2025)	's-Hertogenbosch	24 September 2024		
Peter Schalk	SGP	Veenendaal	13 June 2023		
Edith Schippers	VVD	Baarn	20 June 2023	13 January 2025	
Joris Steenkamp	CDA		19 May 2026		
Karin Straus	VVD	Roermond	1 July 2025		
Gom van Strien	PVV	Arcen	13 June 2023		
Hendrik-Jan Talsma	CU	The Hague	13 June 2023		
Noortje Thijssen	GL/PvdA	Amsterdam	13 June 2023		
Noortje Thijssen	Pro	Amsterdam	13 June 2023		
Madeleine van Toorenburg	CDA	Rosmalen	13 June 2023		
Gala Veldhoen	GL/PvdA	Amsterdam	13 June 2023		
Gala Veldhoen	Pro	Amsterdam	13 June 2023		
Ingrid Visseren-Hamakers	PvdD (Note: Until 10 November 2025)	Rotterdam	13 June 2023		
Ingrid Visseren-Hamakers	Visseren-Hamakers (Note: From 10 November 2025)	Rotterdam	13 June 2023		
Rian Vogels	VVD	Heemstede	13 June 2023		
Mei Li Vos	GL/PvdA	Amsterdam	13 June 2023		
Mei Li Vos	Pro	Amsterdam	13 June 2023		
Marc de Vries	SGP	Papendrecht	12 December 2023		
Pim Walenkamp	BBB	Utrecht	13 June 2023	31 January 2024	
Pim Walenkamp	Walenkamp	Utrecht	23 September 2025		
Elly van Wijk	BBB	Snelrewaard	13 June 2023		

== See also ==
- List of candidates in the 2023 Dutch Senate election
