= List of candidates in the 2023 Dutch Senate election =

Prior to the 2023 Dutch Senate election, contesting parties put forward party lists. The votes shown on this page, are the weighted votes.

== 1: Forum for Democracy ==
Candidate list for the Forum for Democracy
Number	Candidate	Votes	Result
1	Johan Dessing	4,673	Elected
2	Joris van den Oetelaar	40	Elected
3	Simone Kerseboom	153	
4	Tom Russcher	0	
5	Anton van Schijndel	0	
6	Rebecca de Knegt	0	
7	Joyce Vastenhouw	0	
8	Sid Lukkassen	0	
9	Annemarie van der Kolk	0	
10	Peter Vermaas	0	
11	Yvonne Daamen	0	
12	Martin Bos	0	
13	Marcel de Graaff	0	
14	Vera Lubbers	0	
15	Albert van Dijk	0	
16	Remco Roelofs	0	
17	Jozef Minkels	0	
18	Anita van Iperen	0	
19	Kees Claassen	0	
20	Ewald Kegel	0	
21	Anton de Lange	0	
22	Theo Heller	0	
23	Gideon van Meijeren	0	
24	Paul Cliteur	0	
25	Thierry Baudet	0	
Total		4,866	

== 2: People's Party for Freedom and Democracy ==
Candidate list for the People's Party for Freedom and Democracy
Number	Candidate	Votes	Result
1	Edith Schippers	20,534	Elected
2	Jan Anthonie Bruijn	644	Elected
3	Marian Kaljouw	0	Elected
4	Koen Petersen	0	Elected
5	Tanja Klip-Martin	0	Elected
6	Pim van Ballekom	0	Elected
7	Rian Vogels	0	Elected
8	Caspar van den Berg	153	Elected
9	Paulien Geerdink	0	Elected
10	Henk Jan Meijer	0	Elected
11	Marjolein van der Linden	0	Replacement
12	Cees van de Sanden	0	Replacement
13	Karin Straus	480	Replacement
14	Shirin Musa	0	Replacement
15	André Bosman	100	
16	David Ikkersheim	0	
17	Maarten Bakker	0	
18	Jorine Janssen	0	
19	Mirjam Pauwels-Paauw	0	
20	Bram Cool	0	
21	Jan Rijpstra	0	
22	Andries van der Netten van Stigt	0	
23	Dop van Ulzen	283	
24	Gijs van Lookeren Campagne	0	
25	Renée Wilke	0	
26	Sarah Wilton	0	
27	Baerte de Brey	0	
28	Theo Bos	0	
29	Hester Klein Lankhorst	0	
30	Bas Knapp	0	
31	Mike Jansen	0	
32	René Westra	0	
33	Joanneke van Benthem	0	
34	Christiaan Zwart	0	
35	Elsemieke Havenga	0	
36	Joël Scherrenberg	0	
37	Marijke Everts	0	
38	Leon Mol	0	
39	Lex de Lange	0	
40	Marlies de Ruyter de Wildt	0	
41	Gino Ciotti	0	
42	Luydert Smit	0	
43	Mark de Man	0	
44	Menno Loos	0	
45	Rick van der Spek	0	
46	Victor van Kommer	0	
47	Paul Sanders	0	
48	Pieter van der Heijde	0	
49	Machel Nuijten	0	
50	Henry Meijdam	0	
Total		22,194	

== 3: Christian Democratic Appeal ==
Candidate list for the Christian Democratic Appeal
Number	Candidate	Votes	Result	Ref.
1	Theo Bovens	9,157	Elected	
2	Greet Prins-Modderaar	954	Elected	
3	Hugo Doornhof	776	Elected	
4	Janny Bakker	0	Elected	
5	Theo Rietkerk	1,008	Elected	
6	Madeleine van Toorenburg	0	Elected	
7	Tineke Schokker	1,241		
8	Joris Steenkamp	0		Replacement
9	Aline Pastoor	0		
10	Jonathan Soeharno	0		
11	Huib van Olden	0		
12	Anita Sørensen	0		
13	Max Keulaerds	0		
14	Annelies van Vark	0		
15	Ad van der Helm	0		
16	Job van Meijeren	0		
17	Edwin Visser	0		
18	Sander van Waveren	0		
19	Marlou Absil	0		
20	Susanne de Roy van Zuidewijn - Rive	0		
21	Eiko Smid	0		
22	Anna Schröder	0		
23	Mark van Schaijk	0		
24	Lizzy Doorewaard	0		
25	Bertine van Hooff-Nusselder	0		
26	Martijn de Haas	0		
27	Helma Kip	0		
28	Myrthe Kuiper	0		
29	Henk Jan Ormel	0		
30	Jack de Vries	0		
31	Peter Roelofs	0		
32	Marc Dullaert	0		
Total		13,136		

== 4: GroenLinks ==
Candidate list for the GroenLinks
Number	Candidate	Votes	Result	Ref.
1	Paul Rosenmöller	5,843	Elected	
2	Farah Karimi	5,015	Elected	
3	Gala Veldhoen	0	Elected	
4	Saskia Kluit	278	Elected	
5	Daan Roovers	0	Elected	
6	Noortje Thijssen	692	Elected	
7	Menno van der Ven	504		
8	Lara de Brito	2,057		
9	Roel van Gurp	2,390	Elected	
10	Henk Nijmeijer	395		
11	Mirjam Krijnen	0		
12	Ronald Dekker	0		
13	Marry Mos	0		
14	Paul van Gessel	0		
15	Anita Hartholt	0		
16	Reint Rengers	0		
17	Ronald Dekker	139		
18	Monique van Gerwen	0		
19	Andries de Vries	0		
20	Arnie van de Veerdonk	0		
Total		17,313		

== 5: Democrats 66 ==
Candidate list for the Democrats 66
Number	Candidate	Votes	Result
1	Paul van Meenen	7,912	Elected
2	Willemijn Aerdts	0	Elected
3	Boris Dittrich	310	Elected
4	Carla Moonen	522	Elected
5	Fatimazhra Belhirch	956	Elected
6	Antoon Kanis	303	Replacement
7	Meryem Kilic-Karaasian	844	Replacement
8	Peter van der Voort	283	
9	Anne van Veenstra	0	
10	Sander Janssen	0	
11	Emmy Elgersma	0	
12	Joost Röselaers	0	
13	Dave Ensberg-Kleijkers	0	
14	Prachee van Brandenburg-Kulkarni	14	
15	Christiaan Ponsen	0	
16	Rita Braam-van Valkengoed	0	
17	Joke Geldhof	0	
18	Sjaak Neefjes	0	
19	Tariq Sewbaransingh	0	
20	Stefan Wirken	0	
21	Remko Zuidema	0	
22	Dirk-Jan Visser	0	
23	Carinne Elion-Valter	0	
24	Marion Gout-van Sinderen	0	
25	Krista Heins	0	
26	Joost Kramer	0	
27	Ernst Dijxhoorn	0	
Total		11,144	

== 6: Labour Party ==
Candidate list for the Labour Party
Number	Candidate	Votes	Result	Ref.
1	Mei Li Vos		Elected	
2	Jeroen Recourt		Elected	
3	Hetty Janssen		Elected	
4	Randy Martens		Elected	
5	Mary Fiers		Elected	
6	Ferd Crone		Elected	
7	Artie Ramsodit-de Graaf		Elected	
8	Marnix Norder			
9	Naomi Woltring			
10	André Knottnerus			
11	Antoinette Knoet-Michels			
12	Michael Yap			
13	Willemijn Zwart			
14	Gabriël van Rosmalen			
15	Marene Elgershuizen			
16	Duco Bannink			
17	Jessica Hoitink			
18	Arjen Berkvens			
19	Monique Bekkenutte			
20	Frank van de Wolde			

== 7: Party for Freedom ==
Candidate list for the Party for Freedom
Number	Candidate	Votes	Result	Ref.
1	Marjolein Faber		Elected	
2	Gom van Strien		Elected	
3	Alexander van Hattem		Elected	
4	Ton van Kesteren		Replacement	
5	Max Aardema			
6	Ilse Bezaan		Elected	
7	Jeanet Nijhof-Leeuw			
8	Patrick van der Hoeff			
9	Nico Uppelschoten			
10	Nicole Moinat			
11	Elmar Vlottes			

== 8: Socialist Party ==
Candidate list for the Socialist Party
Number	Candidate	Votes	Result	Ref.
1	Tiny Kox		Elected	
2	Rik Janssen		Elected	
3	Bastiaan van Apeldoorn		Elected	
4	Nine Kooiman			
5	Lies van Aelst		Replacement	
6	Frank Futselaar			
7	Mariska ten Heuw			
8	Mathijs ten Broeke			
9	Anna de Groot			
10	Nuretting Altundal			
11	Ger van Unen			
12	Fenna Feenstra			
13	Tjitske Hoekstra			
14	Jannie Drenthe			
15	Aldo Schelvis			
16	Alexander Vervoort			
17	Marij Feddema			
18	Hennie Hemmes			
19	Peter van Zutphen			

== 9: Christian Union ==
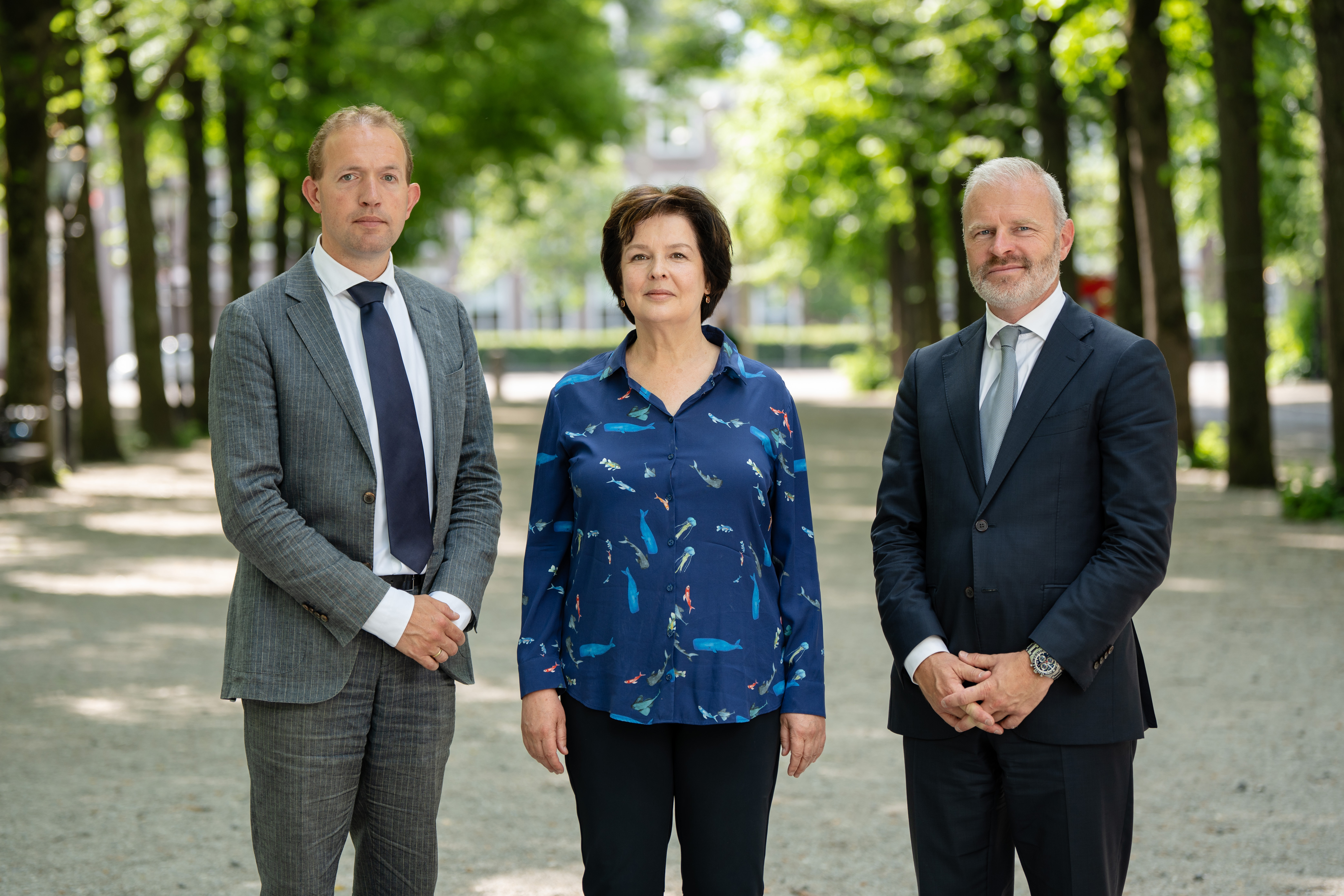
The top 3 candidates of the Christian Union, Hendrik-Jan Talsma, Tineke Huizinga and Eric Holterhues.

Candidate list for the Christian Union
Number	Candidate	Votes	Result	Ref.
1	Tineke Huizinga-Heringa		Elected	
2	Hendrik-Jan Talsma		Elected	
3	Eric Holterhues		Elected	
4	Maarten Verkerk			
5	Jolanda Kluin			
6	Wilfred Veldstra			
7	Beatrice de Graaf			
8	Marco Vermin			
9	Harriette Verwey			
10	Bernard Veldkamp			
11	Dicky Nieuwenhuis			
12	Helga Hart-Sweet			
13	Andries Bouwman			
14	Annebeth Roor-Wubs			
15	Jeroen van Oort			
16	Michel Klein			
17	Corine Dijkstra-Bal			
18	Inge Jongman-Mollema			
19	Onno van Schayck			
20	Joël Voordewind			

== 10: Party for the Animals ==
Candidate list for the Party for the Animals
Number	Candidate	Votes	Result
1	Niko Koffeman		Elected
2	Peter Nicolaï		Elected
3	Ingrid Visseren-Hamakers		Elected
4	Hanneke Schmeets		
5	Sebastiaan van Pruissen		
6	Henriëtte Prast		
7	Rosalie Bunnik		
8	Bibi Dumon Tak		
9	Stephanie Palsma van Voorthuizen		
10	Luuk van der Veer		
11	Marnix van der Werf		
12	Eva Meijer		
13	Maarten Reesink		
14	Erno Eskens		
15	Anja Hazekamp		

== 11: 50PLUS ==
Candidate list for the 50PLUS
Number	Candidate	Votes	Result
1	Martin van Rooijen		Elected
2	Ellen Verkoelen		
3	Erik Jan Meijboom		
4	Robert Gielisse		
5	Johan Hessing		
6	Presley Bergen		
7	Henk van Tilborg		
8	Jan Fonhof		
9	Hans Bongers		
10	Karel Scheps		
11	Willem Dekker		
12	Hein Meijer		
13	Marinus Kasteleijn		
14	Klaas Wilting		

== 12: Reformed Political Party ==
Candidate list for the Reformed Political Party
Number	Candidate	Votes	Result
1	Peter Schalk		Elected
2	Diederik van Dijk		Elected
3	Marc de Vries		Replacement
4	Jan Willem van der Ham		
5	Gert van Leeuwen		
6	Harry van der Maas		
7	Hans Tanis		
8	Rien Hoek		
9	Gert Harm ten Bolscher		
10	Wouter-Jan Vroegindeweij		
11	Arnold Weggeman		
12	Arwin van Buuren		
13	Arnold Versteeg		
14	Eric Boersma		
15	Sjaak Simonse		
16	Jos Bart		
17	David van As		
18	Peter Hoek		
19	Peter Noordergraaf		
20	Lucas Mulder		
21	Gerard van der Waal		
22	Ewart Bosma		
23	Wim de Vries		
24	Henk van Zelst		
25	Kees van Wolfswinkel		
26	Arjan Klein		
27	Joan van Burg		

== 13: Independent Politics Netherlands ==
Candidate list for the Independent Politics Netherlands
Number	Candidate	Votes	Result
1	Auke van der Goot		Elected
2	Ton Raven		
3	Jeff Leever		
4	Jan Jaap de Kloet		
5	John van Gorp		
6	Mark Faasse		
7	Wouter Jansen		

== 14: JA21 ==
Candidate list for the JA21
Number	Candidate	Votes	Result
1	Annabel Nanninga		Elected
2	Karin van Bijsterveld		Elected
3	Ruben Baumgarten		Elected
4	Toine Beukering		Replacement
5	Jos van de Vijver		
6	Petra den Hollander		
7	Ruud Burlet		
8	Gerben Hillebrand de Vries		
9	Hein Leversteijn		
10	Ronald Zoutendijk		
11	Pauline de Bes		
12	Sytse de Jong		
13	Ronald Dijksterhuis		
14	Frank Herreveld		
15	René Nieuwmans		
16	Walter Visser		
17	Jan Cees Vogelaar		
18	Hugo Berkhout		
19	Bob van Pareren		
20	Marco Pastors		

== 15: Farmer–Citizen Movement ==
Candidate list for the Farmer–Citizen Movement
Number	Candidate	Votes	Result
1	Ilona Lagas		Elected
2	Bart Kroon		Elected
3	Gert-Jan Oplaat		Elected
4	Robert Croll		Elected
5	Henk Marquart Scholtz		Elected
6	Elly van Wijk		Elected
7	Eugène Heijnen		Elected
8	Eric Kemperman		Elected
9	Andrea van Langen		Elected
10	Pim Walenkamp		Elected
11	Arie Griffioen		Elected
12	Wim Jaspers		Elected
13	Jan Klopman		Elected
14	Tamara Monzon		Elected, but declined
15	Frans van Knapen		Elected
16	Tekke Panman		Elected
17	Math Goossen		Replacement
18	Robert van Gasteren		Replacement
19	Robbert Lievense		Replacement
20	Andrea van Veen		
21	Steven Vrielink		
22	Ron Nijhof		
23	Alfons Remerij		
24	Anja Hulsbergen		
25	Henk Emmens		
26	Nico de Dood		
27	Jan Woldring		
28	Jeffrey Rouwenhorst		

== 16: Volt Netherlands ==
Candidate list for the Volt Netherlands
Number	Candidate	Votes	Result
1	Gaby Perin-Gopie		Elected
2	Eddy Hartog		Elected
3	Monique van der Poel		
4	Arno Uijlenhoet		
5	Emma Hameleers		
6	Bjorn Beijnon		
7	Marian Mourits		
8	Mathieu Weggeman		
9	Femke Konings		
10	Paul Sanders		

== See also ==
- List of members of the Senate of the Netherlands, 2023–2027

== Sources ==
- Kiesraad (1 June 2023). "Proces-verbaal uitslag Eerste Kamerverkiezing 2023" (PDF) (in Dutch).
