= Hetty Janssen =

Dutch politician

- Hetty Janssen in 2023

Member of the Senate
- Incumbent
- Assumed office 13 June 2023

Personal details
- Born: Henrica Agnes Maria Janssen; 1 January 1954 (age 72) Breda, Netherlands
- Party: PvdA (until 2026); PRO (from 2026)
- Children: 2
- Education: Utrecht University

Henrica Agnes Maria "Hetty" Janssen-van Helvoort (born 1 January 1954) is a Dutch politician. She has been a member of the Dutch Senate since 13 June 2023 for Progressief Nederland (PRO), having previously served in the Provincial Council of Friesland for the Labour Party (PvdA).

== Early life and career ==
Hetty Janssen was born 1 January 1954 in Breda. She studied physics and chemistry at Utrecht University from 1971, graduating in 1976. Motivated by the birth of her disabled daughter, Janssen has written schoolbooks for children with mental disabilities and worked in organizing korfbal for disabled people. From 2000 to 2003, Janssen worked as director of a provincial library support organization in Friesland, and from 2004 to 2012 she was a director and then executive board member of a youth prison. Between 2012 and 2020 she was chair of the executive board of a disability support organization.

== Political career ==
Janssen first decided to become politically active for the Labour Party (PvdA) in 2001 as a counter-reaction to the rise of Pim Fortuyn and a perceived right-ward shift in Dutch politics. In 2011, she was elected to the Provincial Council of Friesland for the PvdA. In the provincial council, she held the portfolios of agriculture and the environment, and worked on making the agricultural system more sustainable. In 2023, Janssen was chosen as the best provincial councilor of the year by her colleagues. That year, Janssen decided to leave the Provincial Council.

For the 2023 Senate elections, Janssen was placed on the third spot of the PvdA's candidate list. She officially became a member of the Senate on 13 June 2023 for the PvdA and from 1 July 2026 for Progressief Nederland (PRO). As a senator, Janssen mostly focuses on housing issues. She has been vice-chair of the Senate committee for Health, Wellness and Sport since 28 October 2025.

== Personal life ==
Hetty Janssen is married. She has a daughter with Down syndrome and a son.
