= Robert Croll =

Robert Croll may refer to:

- Robert Henderson Croll (1869–1947), Australian writer and civil servant
- Robert Croll (politician) (born 1954), Dutch politician
