= Marjolein van der Linden =

Dutch television executive and politician (born 1963)

Member of the Senate
- Incumbent
- Assumed office 14 January 2025
- Preceded by: Edith Schippers

Personal details
- Born: 11 October 1963 (age 62) Hilversum, Netherlands
- Party: People's Party for Freedom and Democracy
- Occupation: Television executive; politician

Marjolein N.J. van der Linden (Dutch: [mɑrjoːˈlɛin vɑn dər ˈlɪndə(n)]; born 11 October 1963) is a Dutch television executive and politician of the conservative-liberal People's Party for Freedom and Democracy (VVD).

== Life and career ==
Van der Linden was born in 1963 in Hilversum. She became a member of the general management of the RTL Nederland media network in 2003, and she simultaneously started serving as the deputy chair of the NDP Nieuwsmedia trade association. She became responsible for RTL Nederland's personnel and legal policy in 2018, and she has served as its chief operating officer since May 2023.

She ran for the Senate in May 2019 and May 2023, being placed 20th and 11th on the VVD's party list, respectively. The party did not secure enough seats on both occasions for Van der Linden to be elected. On 14 January 2025, she was sworn into the Senate as the successor of Edith Schippers, who had stepped down.

== Personal life ==
Van der Linden resides in Hilversum.

== Electoral history ==
Electoral history of Marjolein van der Linden
Year	Body	Party	Pos.	Votes	Result		Ref.
Year	Body	Party	Pos.	Votes	Party seats	Individual	Ref.
2019	Senate	VVD	20	0	12	Lost	
2023	Senate	VVD	11	0	10	Lost (Note: Van der Linden was appointed to the body later during the term due to a vacancy.)	
