= Gert-Jan Oplaat =

Dutch politician (born 1964)

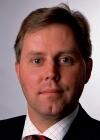
- Oplaat in 2005

Member of the Senate
- Incumbent
- Assumed office 13 June 2023

Member of the House of Representatives
- In office 19 May 1998 – 23 May 2002
- In office 26 July 2002 – 30 November 2006

Personal details
- Born: 22 November 1964 (age 61) Markelo, Netherlands
- Party: VVD (1989–2022); BBB (2022–present)
- Occupation: Entrepreneur; Consultant; Administrator

Gert-Jan Oplaat (born 22 November 1964) is a Dutch politician.

== Career ==
After secondary education he became a member of an agricultural family business. In 1994 he protested against the national manure and ammonia policies.

In 1989 he joined the People's Party for Freedom and Democracy (VVD). Between 1994 and 1998 he was a municipal councillor in Markelo.

He was elected in the 1998 general election. He was his party's spokesman for agriculture. In 2004 he presented a pamphlet arguing for a more right-conservative course, together with Geert Wilders. His place on the candidate list was too low to be re-elected in the 2006 general election.

After leaving parliament he became a consultant, administrator in branche organisations and chairman of the regional chamber of commerce.

Until 2014 he was chairman of the VVD provincial branch in Overijssel.

In 2022 he left the VVD because of discontent about its policies during the nitrogen crisis. After being contacted by multiple parties, he joined the agrarian Farmer–Citizen Movement (BBB). Oplaat was placed third on the BBB's candidate list for the 2023 Senate election and was elected, taking office on 13 June 2023.

== Personal life ==
Oplaat is married. He performs as a cabaretier and singer. He is a Knight in the Order of Orange-Nassau and a member of the Protestant Church in the Netherlands.

== Electoral history ==
Electoral history of Gert-Jan Oplaat
Year	Body	Party	Pos.	Votes	Result		Ref.
Year	Body	Party	Pos.	Votes	Party seats	Individual	Ref.
1998	House of Representatives	VVD	36	3,712	38	Won	
2002	House of Representatives	VVD	27	2,672	24	Lost	
2003	House of Representatives	VVD	23	3,219	28	Won	
2006	House of Representatives	VVD	26	2,601	22	Lost	
2023	Senate	BBB	3		16	Won	
