= Eddy Hartog =

Dutch politician and former civil servant

Member of the Senate (Netherlands)
- Incumbent
- Assumed office 13 June 2023

Personal details
- Born: 17 September 1962 (age 64) Utrecht
- Party: Volt Netherlands
- Children: 2
- Education: Erasmus Universiteit Rotterdam; College of Europe

E. W. (Eddy) Hartog (born 17 September 1962) is a Dutch politician and former civil servant. He has been a member of the Senate for Volt Netherlands since 13 June 2023.

== Biography ==
Hartog was born and raised in Utrecht. He studied economics at Erasmus University Rotterdam from 1980 to 1985 and political science at the College of Europe from 1986 to 1987. From 1989 to 1 June 2023, he worked as a civil servant at the European Commission. Since 1 June 2023, he has worked as an independent mediator under the business name Eddy Hartog Consultancy.

Hartog was placed second on Volt's list of candidates for the 2023 Senate election. Due to Debora Fernald, member of the South Holland States Provincial for GroenLinks, casting a protest vote for Volt, the party received an additional seat, which meant Hartog joined lead candidate Gaby Perin-Gopie in the Senate. Since 13 June 2023, he has been a member of the Senate on behalf of Volt Netherlands.

He is a member of the Senate committees on Foreign Affairs, Defence and Development Cooperation, European Affairs, Finance, Infrastructure, Water Management and Environment, Justice and Security, Knowledge and Kingdom Relations, Hartog also serves as a substitute member of the Dutch delegation to the Benelux Interparliamentary Assembly.

Hartog additionally serves as interim lead of Volt Ireland, the party's unregistered Irish branch.

== Personal life ==
Hartog is married to an Irish woman and has two daughters. He lives in Greystones, Ireland and Brussels.
