= Robbert Lievense =

Dutch politician (born 1983)

Member of the Senate
- Incumbent
- Assumed office 6 February 2024
- Preceded by: Pim Walenkamp

Member of the Schouwen-Duiveland Municipal Council
- In office 28 February 2005 – 6 February 2024

Personal details
- Born: Robbert Lievense; 4 August 1983 (age 42) Noordgouwe, Netherlands
- Party: Farmer–Citizen Movement
- Other political affiliations: Leefbaar Schouwen-Duiveland
- Spouse: Rudi Almekinders
- Occupation: Politician; civil servant

Robbert Lievense (Dutch pronunciation: [ˈrɔbərt ˈlivənsə]; born 4 August 1983) is a Dutch politician of the Farmer–Citizen Movement (BBB).

== Biography ==
Lievense was born in 1983 in Noordgouwe, Schouwen-Duiveland. He did MEAO at ROC Zeeland from 1999 until 2002, and he started working as a strategic adviser for the Noord-Beveland municipality four years later.

In 2005, he became a member of the Municipal Council of Schouwen-Duiveland on behalf of the local Leefbaar Schouwen-Duiveland party, which he helped establish. He also started serving on the board of the Association of Netherlands Municipalities (VNG) in 2018. Lievense participated in the May 2023 Senate election on the party list of BBB, but he did not win a seat. When Pim Walenkamp stepped down as senator, Lievense was selected to succeed him, and he was sworn in on 6 February 2024. He simultaneously left the municipal council and the board of VNG, while he retained his job at the Noord-Beveland municipality.

=== Senate committee assignments ===
- Committee on European Affairs
- Committee on Infrastructure, Water Management and the Environment
- Committee on Health, Welfare and Sport

== Personal life ==
He was a resident of Zierikzee as of 2024, and he is married to Rudi Almekinders.
