= Pim Walenkamp =

Dutch politician (born 1974)

Member of the Senate
- Incumbent
- Assumed office 23 September 2025
- Preceded by: Eugène Heijnen
- In office 13 June 2023 – 31 January 2024
- Succeeded by: Robbert Lievense

Personal details
- Born: Pim V. A. Walenkamp; 2 May 1974 (age 51) Tilburg, Netherlands
- Party: BBB (2021–2025)
- Other political affiliations: CDA (1989–2020)
- Occupation: Politician; teacher

Pim V. A. Walenkamp (Dutch pronunciation: [pɪɱ ˈʋaːlə(ŋ)kɑmp]; born 2 May 1974) is a Dutch teacher and politician. He was a member of the Farmer–Citizen Movement (BBB) between 2021 and 2025.

== Biography ==
Walenkamp was born in 1974 in Tilburg. He studied Dutch language and history, and he subsequently became a teacher in the former subject. Walenkamp moved to Utrecht in 1995.

He had been a supporter of the Christian Democratic Appeal (CDA), but he decided to switch to BBB. Walenkamp was elected to the Senate in May 2023, and he was sworn in on 13 June. He stepped down as of 1 February 2024 due to poor health and his combined workload as a teacher and politician, and he was succeeded by Robbert Lievense. Following the stepping down of Eugène Heijnen, Walenkamp returned to the Senate on 23 September 2025. He was not allowed to rejoin the BBB parliamentary group because of an undisclosed 2024 agreement with the party, and he continued as an independent politician.
