= Eric Holterhues =

Dutch politician

- Eric Holterhues in 2023

Member of the Senate
- Incumbent
- Assumed office 13 June 2023

Personal details
- Born: Frederik Wilhelm Johan Holterhues; 16 May 1972 (age 54) Rotterdam, Netherlands
- Party: Christian Union
- Education: Catholic University of Utrecht; Erasmus University Rotterdam

Frederik Wilhelm Johan "Eric" Holterhues (born 16 May 1972) is a Dutch banker and politician. He has served as a member of the Dutch Senate since 13 June 2023 for the Christian Union. He is the first national Christian Union politician to be a Roman Catholic as well as the party's first openly homosexual politician.

== Early life ==
Eric Holterhues was born on 16 May 1972 in Rotterdam. He was born into a Roman Catholic family, his mother having moved to Rotterdam from North Brabant in the 1950s and his father being a dockworker turned manager. According to Holterhues, he was shaped significantly by his Catholic secondary school, which instilled in him both the Roman Catholic faith and the importance of service to society.

After serving in the Dutch army, Holterhues studied theology at the Catholic University of Utrecht, intending to become a priest. After staying in Kenya for a period, Holterhues reconsidered and decided not to enter the priesthood. Holterhues subsequently studied Financial Economic Management at the Erasmus University Rotterdam, and began working as a banker at Triodos Bank, a bank that seeks to promote sustainability. He eventually became the manager of two investment funds there.

From 2017 to 2023, Holterhues was the director of Oikocredit Nederland, which provides funding for microfinance initiatives in developing countries, He has also been the director of Partnerships for Impact FMO since 1 December 2023, as well as chair of the supervisory board of public broadcasting association KRO-NCRV since 2024.

== Political career ==
Holterhues is a member of the Christian Union, and before entering the Senate was a member of the party's think tank. His status as both a Catholic and an openly gay man led to some controversy within the religiously Protestant party, with one member at a party congress declaring the candidacy of "practicing homosexual" Holterhues to be "unbiblical", though the majority of Christian Union members supported Holterhues.

Although Holterhues, placed on the third spot of the Christian Union, was not expected to be elected, when the party obtained a third seat in the Senate Holterhues took up that seat. Holterhues officially began his term as senator on 13 June 2023. As a senator, Holterhues has focused on issues including financial and economic affairs, infrastructure, and the environment. In 2026, Holterhues was the only Christian Union senator to vote in favor of a proposal to ban conversion therapy.

== Personal life ==
Holterhues is openly homosexual, and lives together with his partner.
