= Meryem Karaaslan-Kilic =

Dutch politician

Member of the Senate
- Incumbent
- Assumed office 24 February 2026

Personal details
- Born: Meryem Karaaslan; 12 September 1971 (age 55) Rotterdam, Netherlands
- Party: D66
- Children: 2
- Education: HU University of Applied Sciences Utrecht (2001–2004); Vrije Universiteit Amsterdam (2004–2007)

Meryem Karaaslan-Kilic (born 12 September 1971) is a Dutch management consultant and politician. She has been a member of the Dutch Senate for Democrats 66 (D66) since 24 February 2026.

== Early life ==
Meryem Karaaslan-Kilic was born on 12 September 1971 in Rotterdam. From 1990 to 2001, she was deputy chairwoman of a Turkish women's organization in Amersfoort. Karaaslan-Kilic studied communications management at the HU University of Applied Sciences Utrecht from 2001 to 2004, followed by a master's degree in management consulting at the Vrije Universiteit Amsterdam from 2007 to 2008.

In 2001, Karaaslan-Kilic became a management consultant at the consulting firm TwynstraGudde. She left the company in 2015 to become a management advisor for the municipality of Amsterdam, before becoming municipal secretary of Blaricum from 2016 to 2020. Karaaslan-Kilic returned to TwynstraGudde as a partner in 2020, becoming its director in 2024. Karaaslan-Kilic was a member of the leadership of the Dutch Sports Council from 2021 to 2024, and also serves on the supervisory councils of Child Protection Rotterdam Rijnmond from 2017 and of the Inholland college from 2019, in addition to various other functions.

== Political career ==
Karaaslan-Kilic is a member of Democrats 66 (D66). On 24 February 2026, she became a member of the Senate for D66, succeeding Willemijn Aerdts following her accession to the Jetten cabinet as state secretary. Upon her inauguration as senator, Karaaslan-Kilic stated her intention to focus on the quality and feasibility of legislation, equal rights, and restoring public trust in politics.

== Personal life ==
Karaaslan-Kilic is married, and has two sons. She is Muslim.
