= GroenLinks–PvdA =

Political alliance in the Netherlands

- Abbreviation: GL/PvdA
- Leader in the House of Representatives: Jesse Klaver
- Leader in the Senate: Paul Rosenmöller
- Founded: 2023
- Dissolved: 1 July 2026
- Succeeded by: Progressive Netherlands
- Ideology: Social democracy Green politics Progressivism
- Political position: Centre-left to left-wing
- Regional affiliation: SGD/SVD
- Member parties: GroenLinks; Labour Party
- Colours: Green; Red

GroenLinks–PvdA (Dutch: [ɣrunˈlɪŋks ˌpeːveːdeːˈjaː]; alternatively PvdA–GroenLinks, or GreenLeft–Labour in English) was an electoral and political alliance between GroenLinks (GL; GreenLeft) and the Labour Party (PvdA) in the Netherlands.

The political alliance was founded at the national level by party leaders Lilianne Ploumen and Jesse Klaver during the 2021–2022 Dutch cabinet formation. In contrast, local alliances between the two parties had already been formed in prior years. The two parties formed a joint parliamentary group in the Provincial Council of Zeeland in 29 March 2023, then formed a joint group in the Senate following the 2023 Dutch Senate election, and formed a joint group in the House of Representatives on 27 October 2023.

Following the collapse of the fourth Rutte cabinet in July 2023, the leaders of PvdA (Attje Kuiken) and GL (Jesse Klaver) announced their intention to contest the 2023 Dutch general election as an alliance. Members of both PvdA and GroenLinks voted in favour of the proposal, and confirmed Frans Timmermans as lead candidate in August.

Despite their joint list in the 2024 European Parliament election, GroenLinks members joined the Greens/EFA group, while PvdA members joined the S&D group. Through internal referendums in both PvdA and GL in June 2025, members from both parties voted in favour of a full merger into a new political party to be formed in 2026, along with an alliance for the 2025 Dutch general election. The new party, Progressief Nederland, was formed by the merger of both parties on 1 July 2026.

== History ==
Logos used by the GL/PvdA alliances in the municipalities of Best and Stede Broec

=== Informal cooperations ===
Prior to the formation of a national alliance, the Labour Party (PvdA) and GroenLinks (GL) had already formed local alliances in some municipalities; in the 2022 municipal elections, the two parties participated with a joint list in 50 local municipalities. In addition, they had formed electoral alliances (Dutch: lijstverbindingen) in multiple national elections, such as the 2009 European Parliament election and the 2010 general election.

=== The concept behind the alliance ===
The idea of a possible merger of centre-left parties in the Netherlands, including the PvdA and GL, is not new. As early as 2004, Job Cohen, then mayor of Amsterdam and later PvdA national leader, called for a merger of the PvdA, GL and Socialist Party (SP), suggesting "Progressive People's Party" as a possible name. That name refers to an even earlier proposal with the same name that was discussed in the 1970s of the PvdA, Democrats 66 (D66) and the Political Party of Radicals (PPR), one of GL's forerunners, to merge into a single party. This, however, never materialised.

Following the heavy defeat of the PvdA in the 2017 general election, in which the party went from 25 per cent to less than six per cent of the vote, discussions about a possible merger began to rise again. With this electoral demise, the left-of-centre political landscape in the Netherlands — including D66, GL, SP, the Party for the Animals (PvdD), Christian Union (CU), Volt Netherlands, DENK and BIJ1 — fragmented. In both the 2017 and 2021 general elections, there was no left-leaning party big enough to be the main contender to Prime Minister Mark Rutte's People's Party for Freedom and Democracy (VVD) from the left. Many left-leaning voters in the Netherlands have a habit of voting tactically for the largest left-leaning force in an attempt to prevent a right-leaning party from becoming the largest party. Examples of this are the 2012 and 2003 general elections when voters from other left-leaning parties flocked to the Labour Party.

When the PvdA and GL received a disappointing election result in the 2021 general election (5.7 per cent and 5.0 per cent respectively), calls for a merger increased. In the first week after the elections, members from both parties founded the movement Red-Green (Dutch: Rood-Groen) led by Frank van de Wolde calling for more cooperation between the two parties and an eventual merger. This movement has tabled motions in multiple party member meetings of both the PvdA and GL that pushed the parties towards a deeper cooperation.

=== 2021–2022 cabinet formation ===
During the 2021–2022 cabinet formation, Lilianne Ploumen (PvdA) and Jesse Klaver (GL) indicated that they only wanted to join a coalition government if the other party also joined, thereby forming an alliance in the negotiations. In August 2021, PvdA members passed multiple motions tabled by the Red-Green movement that forced the party to not enter government without GL and further steps to strengthen the cooperation. People's Party for Freedom and Democracy (VVD) leader Mark Rutte strongly opposed forming a coalition with both the PvdA and GL, and referred to the alliance as a 'left-wing cloud' (Dutch: linkse wolk). Following their exclusion from the fourth Rutte cabinet, the Labour Party and GroenLinks decided to intensify co-operation as opposition parties.

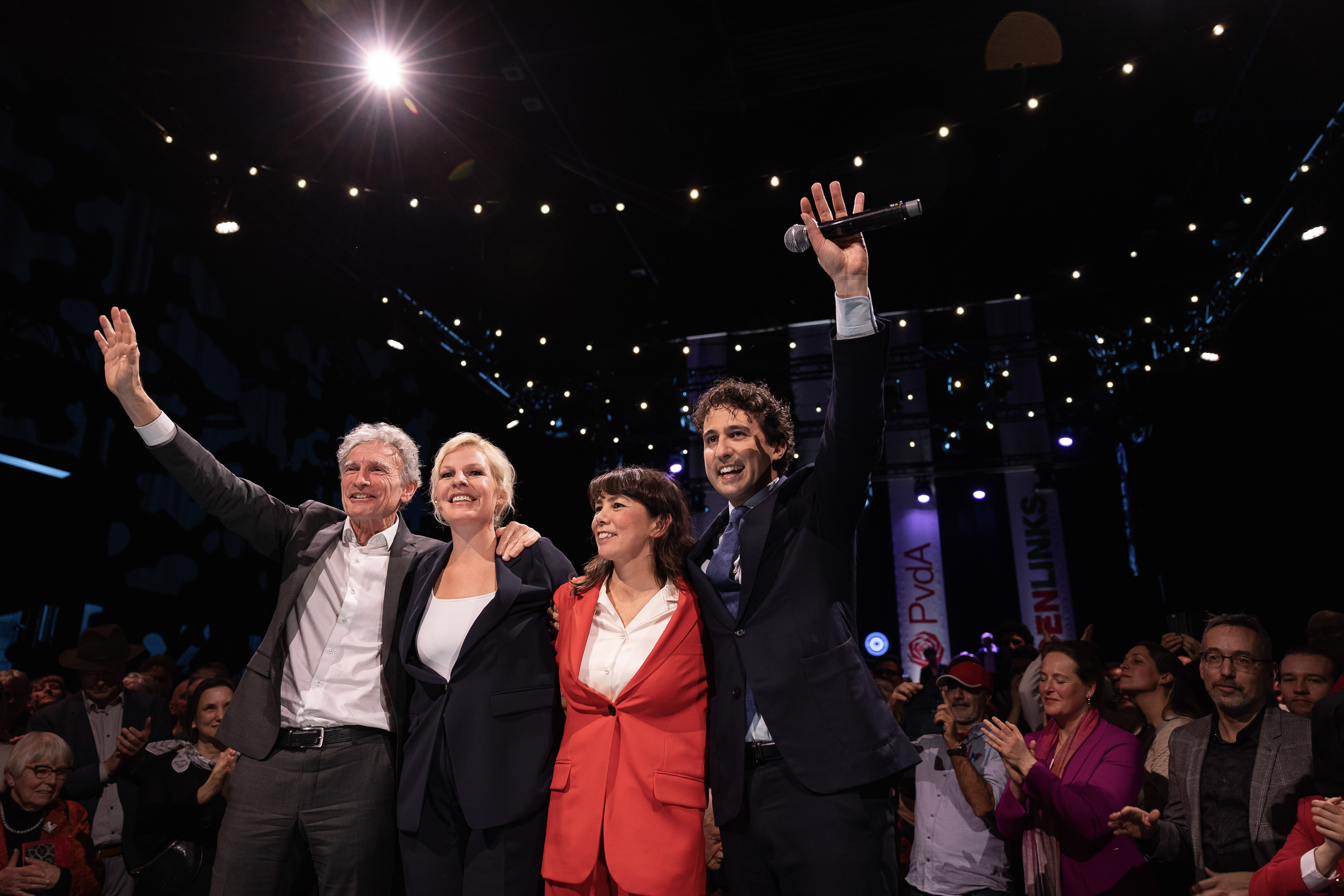
GroenLinks leader Jesse Klaver (right) and lead candidate for the Senate Paul Rosenmöller (left), and Labour Party leader Attje Kuiken and lead candidate for the Senate Mei Li Vos (centre) in 2023

=== 2023 provincial and Senate elections ===
The PvdA and GL participated in the 2023 provincial elections separately, but formed a joint list in Zeeland. After the 2023 Senate election, in which the members of the Senate were elected by the members of the provincial councils and electoral colleges, the two parties formed a joint group in the senate. With fourteen seats, the PvdA–GroenLinks group became the second-largest senate group behind the Farmer–Citizen Movement.

=== 2023 general election ===
Following the collapse of the fourth Rutte cabinet on 7 July 2023, PvdA leader Attje Kuiken and GroenLinks leader Jesse Klaver announced their intention to contest the 2023 Dutch general election, to be held on 22 November, with a joint electoral list and lead candidate. From 10 to 17 July 2023, both parties held an internal referendum on this proposal. Approximately 88% of PvdA members and 92% of GL members voted in favour of participating in the election with a joint GL/PvdA list.

Three days later, former foreign minister Frans Timmermans (PvdA) declared his intention to become lead candidate for the alliance. His candidacy was met with widespread approval from both parties. On 22 August 2023, during a joint GroenLinks–PvdA party meeting, Timmermans was confirmed as lead candidate with 92 percent of the vote. He resigned from his posts at the European Commission on the same day.

PvdA–GL finished the election with 25 seats and 15.75% of the vote, finishing second to the right-wing Party for Freedom (PVV) but ahead of the governing People's Party for Freedom and Democracy (VVD). The coalition hoped to form a government with New Social Contract and other, smaller parties like the Party for the Animals (PvdD). Timmermans ruled out forming a government with PVV and VVD, and admitted that it was "extremely unlikely" that PvdA-GL would be in cabinet. GL–PvdA ended up as opposition to the Schoof cabinet.

=== 2025 general election ===
After the fall of the Schoof cabinet, both GL and PvdA held an internal referendum about another joint list for the 2025 Dutch general election between 5 and 12 June 2025. On 12 June 2025, a joint list was confirmed, with 95.0% of the GL voters and 93.7% of the PvdA voters voting in favour. In the election, GL–PvdA obtained 20 seats, losing 5 compared to the 2023 election. After the exit poll was announced, Timmermans announced his resignation as leader of the alliance, and former GroenLinks leader Jesse Klaver was subsequently chosen by the parliamentary group as its chair.

== Merger ==
There has been an ongoing discussion about a possible merger of the two parties into a single party. Proponents – including former Labour Party leaders Job Cohen and Diederik Samsom and Labour Party prominent and former health minister Hedy d'Ancona, and GroenLinks prominents Bram van Ojik, Andrée van Es and Bas de Gaay Fortman – have shown support for a merger by becoming a member of each other's party. They have also founded the activist group 'RedGreen' (Dutch: RoodGroen) to advocate for the creation of a "strong, leftist movement" for "social, green and righteous politics". Opponents, on the other hand, have expressed concern for the "ideological dilution" and possible loss of electorate as a consequence of the parties' merger.

On 13 March 2025, it was announced that members of the parties would be able to vote for a decision in principle about founding a new left and green party on 21 June 2025. The referendum was brought forward to between 5 and 12 June 2025 after the fall of the Schoof cabinet. On 12 June 2025, it was announced that GL and PvdA would merge into a new party in 2026, with 89.1% of GL voters and 88.0% of PvdA voters voting in favour.

On 26 March 2026, Jesse Klaver hosted an event, revealing the party's new name as Progressief Nederland, as well as its logo. The party was established on 13 June.

== Political positions ==
=== Energy policy ===
GL-PvdA opposes nuclear power, despite party leader Frans Timmermans giving it a green label whilst European Commissioner for Climate Action.

=== Foreign policy ===
GL-PvdA advocates in favour of a total weapons embargo against Israel, including components for the Iron Dome defence system, citing Israeli attacks on Iran.

=== Immigration ===
GL-PvdA seeks a reduction in the number of asylum seekers coming to the Netherlands.

=== Monarchy ===
At the last party conference prior to the 2023 Dutch general election, 52% of members voted for abolition of the Dutch monarchy. Timmermans, the political leader at that time, stated it would not have priority.

== Election results ==
=== House of Representatives ===
Election	Lead candidate	List	Votes	%	Seats	+/–	Government
2023	Frans Timmermans	List	1,643,073	15.75	25 / 150	▲8 (Note: Compared to the totals of PvdA and GroenLinks in 2021)	Opposition
2025	Frans Timmermans	List	1,352,163	12.79	20 / 150	▼5	Opposition

=== European Parliament ===
Election	List	Votes	%	Seats	+/–	EP Group
2024	List	1,314,428	21.09	8 / 31	▼1 (Note: Compared to the totals of PvdA and GroenLinks in 2019)	Greens-EFA / S&D

=== Provincial elections ===
Election	Province	Votes	%	Seats	+/−
2023	Zeeland	24,514	13.4	6 / 39	New

== See also ==
- CU–SGP
- Green Progressive Accord
- Rainbow (Netherlands)
- Red-Greens (Sweden)
- Labor-Gesher-Meretz
