= Randy Martens =

Dutch politician

- Randy Martens in 2023

Member of the Senate
- Incumbent
- Assumed office 13 June 2023

Personal details
- Born: 13 December 1987 (age 38) Groningen, Netherlands
- Party: PvdA (until 2026); PRO (from 2026)
- Education: University of Groningen

Randy Martens (born 13 December 1987) is a Dutch politician. He has been a member of the Dutch Senate since 13 June 2023 for Progressief Nederland, before 2026 for the Labour Party (PvdA). He previously served as a member of the municipal council of Groningen from 2010 to 2013.

== Biography ==
Martens was born on 13 December 1987 in Groningen. He attended secondary school at the Drachtster Lyceum in Drachten, and then studied economics at the University of Groningen from 2006 to 2013. Martens subsequently worked at various Dutch government ministries as an economist and as a public housing lobbyist at an organization of housing associations Aedes.

His political career began with the Young Socialists (JS), the youth organization of the Labour Party (PvdA), becoming its treasurer in March 2006. After the 2010 municipal elections, he became a member of the Groningen municipal council. He stood out during his time on the council when, during an crisis within the PvdA in Groningen in 2012, he defended alderwoman Elly Pastoor, who was forced to resign following a report by Jacques Tichelaar, the Queen’s Commissioner for Drenthe, regarding misconduct within the party's Groningen branch. According to Martens, this led to significant tensions within the party including towards Martens himself during the dispute. In September 2013, he left the city council after accepting a position at the Dutch Ministry of Finance in The Hague.

From February 2014 to September 2017, Martens served for some time as a member of the PvdA’s national executive committee. Since 2017, Martens has hosted the podcast Studio Tegengif. In 2019, he contributed to the publication "Failing to Intervene in the Housing Market Is Not an Option" by the Wiardi Beckman Foundation, the PvdA’s party think tank. On 13 June 2023 Martens was sworn in as a member of the Dutch Senate. He is the party's spokesperson on finance and defense.

Martens has been employed by the province of Groningen since 1 August 2021, where he was chief of staff to the King’s Commissioner until 2023. Since then, he has been the province's talent development program manager.
