= Joris Steenkamp =

Dutch politician (born 1992)

Member of the Senate
- Incumbent
- Assumed office 19 May 2026
- Preceded by: Greet Prins

Personal details
- Born: 3 January 1992 (age 34)
- Party: Christian Democratic Appeal
- Parent: Thomas Steenkamp (father)
- Relatives: Piet Steenkamp (grandfather)

Joris Steenkamp (born 3 January 1992) is a Dutch politician serving as a member of the Senate since 2026. He is the youngest current member of the Senate. He is the son of Thomas Steenkamp and the grandson of Piet Steenkamp.
