= Robert Croll (politician) =

Dutch politician

Member of the Senate
- Incumbent
- Assumed office 13 June 2023

Personal details
- Born: Robert Samuel Croll; 9 December 1954 (age 71) Utrecht, Netherlands
- Party: D66 (until 2023; since 2025)
- Other political affiliations: Volt (until 2023); CDA (until 2023); BBB (2023–2025)
- Spouse: Cathrien van Verschuer
- Children: 3
- Occupation: Judge • Politician

Robert Samuel Croll (born 9 December 1954) is a Dutch politician and former judge. He has been a member of the Senate since 13 June 2023.

In the spring of 2023, he switched from the Christian Democratic Appeal to the Farmer–Citizen Movement and became the fourth candidate for the Senate on behalf of the party. During these elections, the BBB won sixteen seats in the Senate. On July 4, 2023, he was elected second Vice President of the Senate.

In June 2025, he announced his switch to D66, partly because of the BBB's position on Gaza. However, he remained a member of the Senate. In the Senate, the coalition of PVV, VVD, NSC and BBB thus lost its second seat in a month; Eric Kemperman had already left the BBB faction earlier in the year.
