= Ruben Baumgarten =

Dutch politician

Member of the Senate
- Incumbent
- Assumed office June 13, 2023

Personal details
- Born: Ruben Baumgarten; 7 May 1969 (age 56) The Hague, Netherlands
- Party: JA21
- Children: 3

Ruben Baumgarten (born 7 May 1969) is a Dutch politician of the JA21 party and doctor who has been a Member of the Senate since 2023.

Baumgarten studied medicine at the Erasmus University Rotterdam before completing a PhD at Radboud University. He then worked as a general director for a diagnostics centre. In June 2023, he was elected as a member of the Senate for the JA21 party.
