= Antoon Kanis =

Dutch politician (born 1990)

Member of the Senate
- Incumbent
- Assumed office 18 November 2025
- Preceded by: Fatimazhra Belhirch

Personal details
- Born: 19 January 1990 (age 36)
- Party: Democrats 66

Antoon Kanis (born 19 January 1990) is a Dutch politician serving as a member of the Senate since 2025. From 2015 to 2023, he was a member of the Provincial Council of Gelderland.
