= Edith Schippers =

Dutch politician (born 1964)

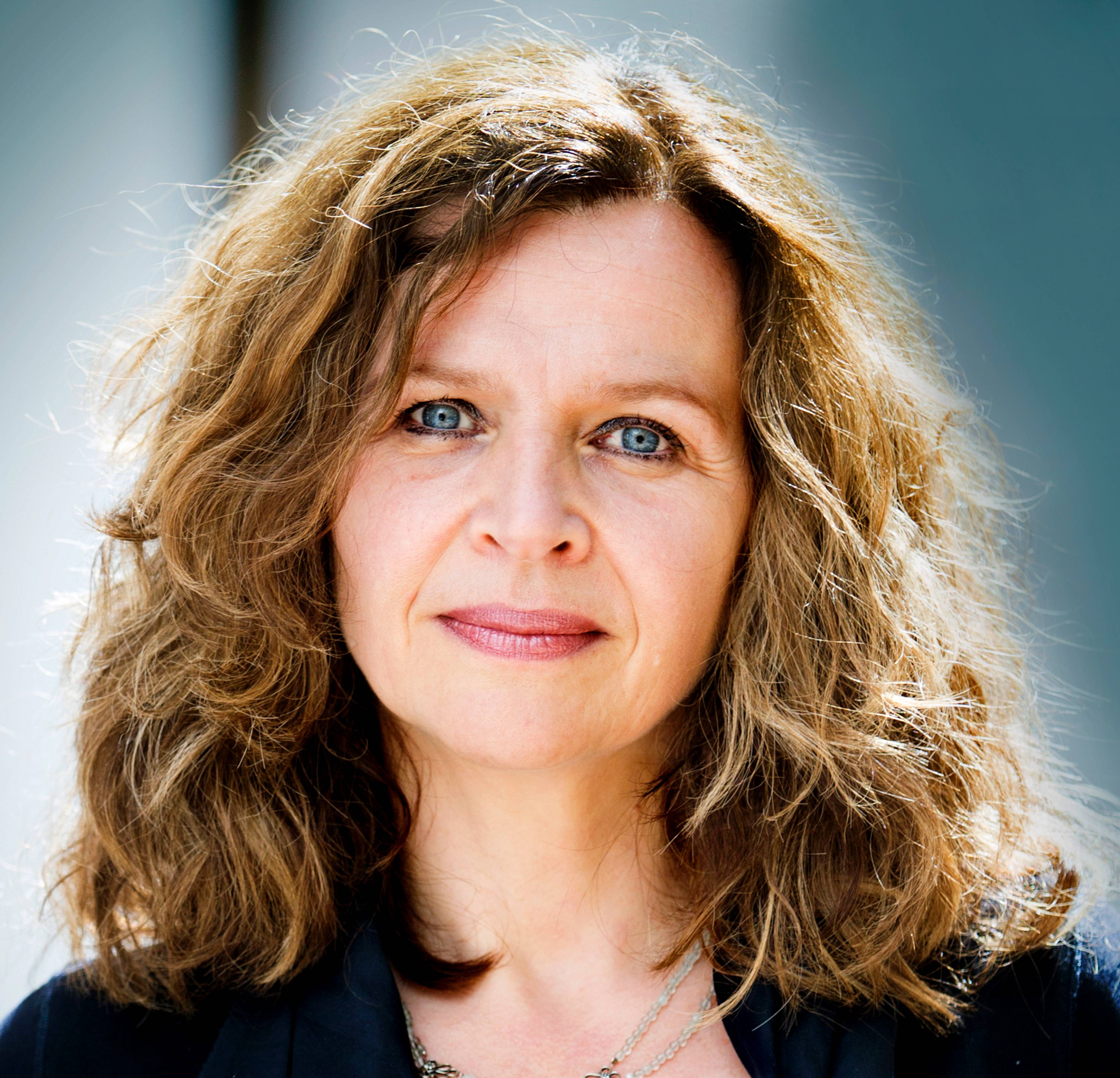
- Schippers in 2015

Leader of the VVD in the Senate
- In office 4 July 2023 – 31 December 2024
- Preceded by: Annemarie Jorritsma
- Succeeded by: Tanja Klip-Martin

Member of the Senate
- In office 4 July 2023 – 13 January 2025
- Succeeded by: Marjolein van der Linden

Minister of Health, Welfare and Sport
- In office 14 October 2010 – 26 October 2017
- Prime Minister: Mark Rutte
- Preceded by: Ab Klink
- Succeeded by: Hugo de Jonge

Member of the House of Representatives
- In office 20 September 2012 – 5 November 2012
- In office 3 June 2003 – 14 October 2010

Personal details
- Born: Edith Ingeborg Schippers; 25 August 1964 (age 62) Utrecht, Netherlands
- Party: People's Party for Freedom and Democracy (from 1991)
- Spouse: Sander Speijker (m. 1995)
- Children: 1 daughter
- Education: Leiden University (Bachelor of Social Science, Master of Social Science)
- Occupation: Politician · Businesswoman · Political consultant · Corporate director · Nonprofit director

Edith Ingeborg Schippers (born 25 August 1964) is a Dutch politician of the People's Party for Freedom and Democracy (VVD) and businesswoman who served as President of DSM Netherlands between 2019 and 2023.

Schippers, a political consultant by occupation, worked for the Industry and Employers Confederation from 1997 until 2003. Schippers became a member of the House of Representatives shortly after the 2003 general election taking office on 3 June 2003, serving as a frontbencher and spokesperson for health, deputy spokesperson for employment and as deputy parliamentary leader. After the 2010 general election, Schippers was appointed as Minister of Health, Welfare and Sport in the Rutte I cabinet taking office on 14 October 2010. Following the 2012 general election, she returned to the House of Representatives serving from 20 September 2012 until 5 November 2012, when she continued as Minister of Health, Welfare and Sport in the Rutte II cabinet. In May 2017, Schippers announced her retirement from national politics and did not stand for the 2017 general election; she left office upon the installation of the Rutte III cabinet on 26 October 2017.

Schippers retired after spending 14 years in national politics and became active in the private sector, as a corporate director for DSM Netherlands. For the 2023 Senate election, she returned to politics as VVD lead candidate. She was elected, but she left the Senate in January 2025 to become CEO of pharmaceutical wholesaler Mosadex.

== Early life ==
Schippers was born in Utrecht, but spent her years attending primary school in Dordrecht. At the age of 12, she moved to Wachtum in Drenthe.

Edith Schippers' alma mater is Leiden University, where she studied political science from 1985 till 1991. She also spent half a year studying at Jawaharlal Nehru University in New Delhi, India in 1990.

In 1993, Schippers became personal assistant to member of parliament Dick Dees. She served in this position until 1994, after which she became a staff member of the VVD parliamentary fraction dealing with healthcare, welfare and sports. After that, Schippers found employment at employers' organisation VNO-NCW. From 1997 until 2001, her portfolio as secretary for VNO-CNW included healthcare and the labour market and from 2001 until 2003 spatial planning.

== Political career ==
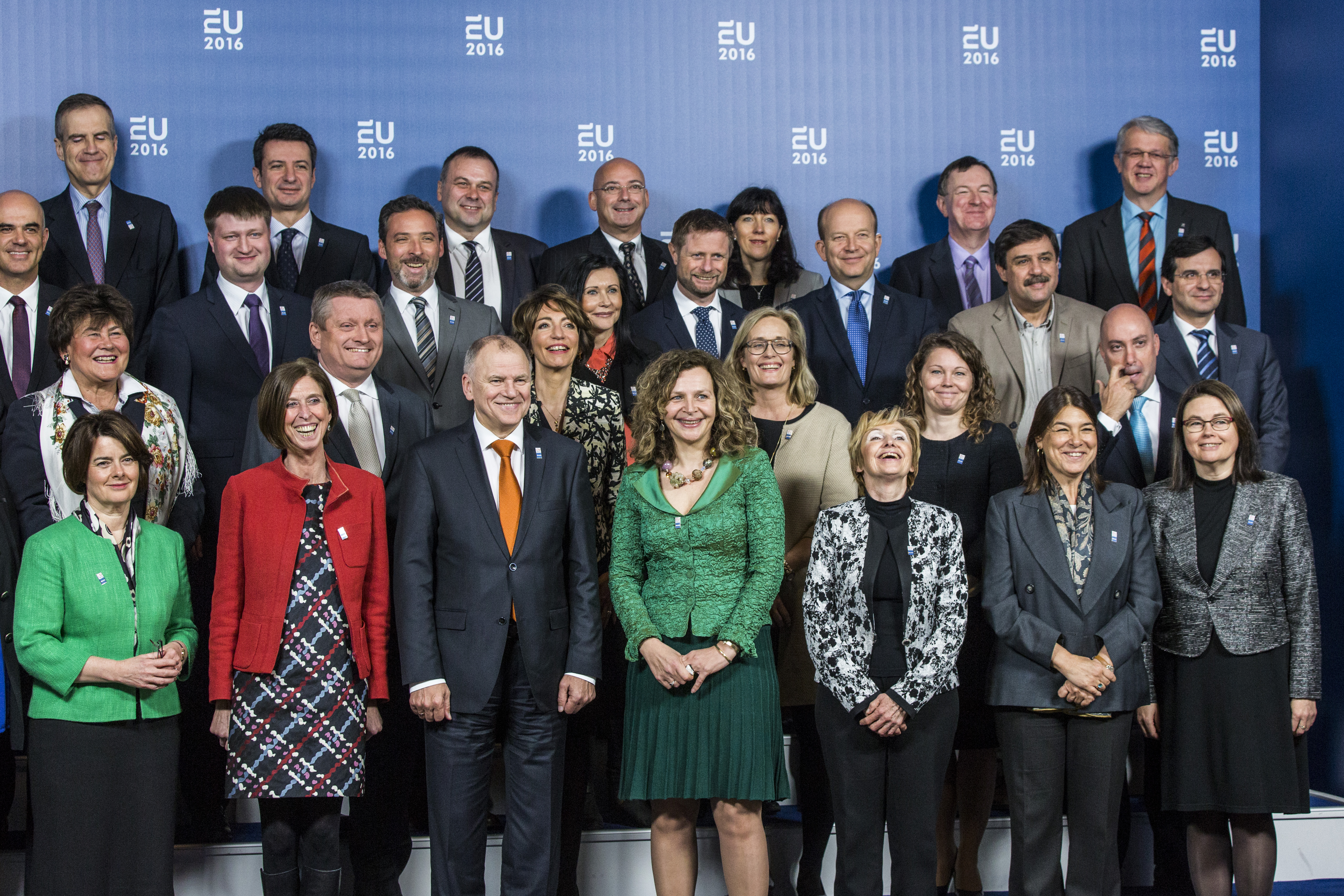
Schippers surrounded by the other Health ministers of the EU in Amsterdam, 2016

Schippers was elected into the House of Representatives in the 2003 general election and was sworn in on 3 June of that year. Geert Wilders became her mentor. In 2006, she was elected as vice chairman of the VVD parliamentary party. Schippers considered this a great honour, but not her greatest success.

In 2010, she succeeded Ab Klink in becoming Minister of Health, Welfare and Sport in the first Rutte cabinet. She briefly returned to the House of Representatives after the 2012 general election, but left again when the continuation of her ministership in the second Rutte cabinet was confirmed.

As Minister of Health, Schippers was repeatedly accused of being a tobacco industry lobbyist, and was labeled "minister Tobacco", because she had ties to the tobacco industry and because she tried to revert the ban on smoking in bars and cafes. She also overcame three motions of no confidence in the House of Representatives.

One was issued in 2012, for not adequately informing the States General about the costs of bringing the Olympics to the Netherlands. In the same year another motion of no confidence was issued against her and minister Henk Bleker, for the way they treated the issues surrounding Q-fever. In 2013 a motion was issued regarding her actions with regard to fraud in the healthcare sector. In 2016 this issue regarding her actions with regard to fraud in the healthcare sector was investigated on a Dutch talkshow

In March 2017, she announced she would not return in a new cabinet. On 26 October 2017, she was succeeded by Hugo de Jonge.

Schippers briefly returned to the political scene following the 2017 general election, when Speaker Khadija Arib appointed Schippers as the so-called informateur, whose role is to explore possible governing alliances. In February 2018, she was speculated as a possible successor to the recently resigned Minister of Foreign Affairs Halbe Zijlstra, but she expressed that she was not available for another ministership, wanting instead to spend more time with her daughter.

Schippers was her party's lead candidate in the 2023 Senate election, and she won a seat. Under her leadership, the parliamentary group announced it would support the Dispersal Act, a bill intended to more fairly distribute asylum seekers across the Netherlands. Her party had voted against the bill in the House of Representatives, and party leader Dilan Yeşilgöz had tried to prevent its treatment in the Senate. Schippers stated that the political landscape had shifted since the House vote, citing a new majority supportive of measures to simultaneously reduce refugee arrivals. She was appointed CEO of pharmaceutical wholesaler Mosadex, effective 1 January 2025. Schippers stepped down from the Senate on 13 January, unable to combine both roles, and she was succeeded as parliamentary leader by Tanja Klip-Martin.

== Personal life ==
Schippers is married to Sander Spijker, a project manager for P5COM who is specialised in profit improvement and cost reduction in the healthcare industry. They have one child, a daughter.

== Literature ==
- Versteegh, Kees (2021). Schaduwleiders: rollen en invloeden van 'tweede mannen' in de politiek (in Dutch). Boom. ISBN 978-90-5875-541-4.

Political offices
Preceded by Ab Klink	Minister of Health, Welfare and Sport; 2010–2017	Succeeded by Hugo de Jonge
