= Catholic University of Utrecht =

Pontifical university

Coordinates: 52°5′7″N 5°10′30″E

- Katholieke Theologische Universiteit
- Other names: Catholic Theological University
- Type: Pontifical university / Public institution
- Affiliations: Holy See
- Location: Utrecht, Netherlands

The Catholic University of Utrecht or Catholic Theological University was a Roman Catholic pontifical university in Utrecht, Netherlands. The university was a public institution and was primarily focused on educating future Catholic priests. In 2006 the university merged into the larger University of Tilburg.

== History ==
In the late 1960s, the Roman Catholic major seminaries in the Netherlands were closed. From then on, the desire was to train future priests at theological colleges and faculties. To this end, the Catholic Theological College Utrecht (KTHU) and the Catholic Theological College Amsterdam (KTHA) were founded on December 2, 1967. During the same period, the School of Theology and Pastoral Care in Heerlen and the Theological Faculty in Tilburg were also established.

The future bishop, Bernard Möller, became the first rector of the KTHU. Within a few years, the proportion of priestly students in the student body of the KTHA and the KTHU declined sharply, leading to the emergence of a Catholic theological program with a highly diverse student body. When Dutch universities of applied sciences were permitted to call themselves universities, the KTHU and KTHA also followed suit. They were now called the Catholic Theological University Utrecht (KTUU) and the Catholic Theological University Amsterdam (KTUA). The merger of these two programs resulted in the Catholic Theological University (Utrecht) on January 1, 1991.

In 2007, the KTU merged with the Faculty of Theology and Religious Studies of Tilburg University (UvT) to form the Faculty of Catholic Theology, later renamed Tilburg School of Catholic Theology. The previously independent Tilburg Theological Faculty had already merged with Tilburg University in 2006.
