= Greet Prins =

Dutch politician (1954–2026)

Greet Prins-Modderaar

Member of the Senate
- In office 2019–2026
- Succeeded by: Joris Steenkamp

Personal details
- Born: Grietje Modderaar; 5 January 1954 Appingedam, Netherlands
- Died: 24 April 2026 (aged 72)

Grietje (Greet) Prins-Modderaar (5 January 1954 – 24 April 2026) was a Dutch politician.

== Life and career ==
Grietje Prins-Modderaar was born in Appingedam on 5 January 1954. She was a member of the Senate from 2019 to 2026.

Prins died on 24 April 2026, at the age of 72.
