= Math Goossen =

Dutch politician

Member of the Senate
- Incumbent
- Assumed office 13 June 2023

Personal details
- Born: 5 August 1954 (age 72) Hoensbroek, Netherlands
- Party: BBB (since 2022)
- Children: 2
- Education: Utrecht University

M.J.L. "Math" Goossen (born 5 August 1954) is a Dutch politician and writer. He has been a member of the Dutch Senate since 2023 for the Farmer-Citizen Movement (BBB).

== Early life ==
Math Goossen was born on 5 August 1954 in Hoensbroek. According to Goossen, he was a rebellious child, who often clashed with authority figures. He began his career at the Dutch Ministry of Defense, after which he worked for the Dutch Railways (NS) for a period. From 1992 to 1994, Goossen studied industrial engineering at a trade college in Heerlen, after which he worked as manager and director for various companies throughout the 1990s and 2000s. From 2008 to 2011, he was a director at BrabantZorg, a large health care provider. Goossen was the owner of a business consultancy firm between 2014 and 2020.

Following the birth of his first grandchild in 2007, Goossen decided to write his first novel, based on his own childhood and experiences as a baby boomer, Aan het Wolfshoofdplein, which released in 2008. He had previously been a freelance journalist for a regional newspaper in the 1980s and published a short story. He has also been the chairperson of a veterans' group in North and Middle Limburg, and is a member of Mensa.

== Political career ==
On 13 June 2023, Goossen became a member of the Senate for the Farmer-Citizen Movement (BBB), after the initial candidate Tamara Monzon had refused the seat due to private reasons. As a senator, Goossen has focused on defense, foreign affairs, and digitalization.

In 2026, Goossen was one of three BBB senators to vote against proposed legislation banning conversion therapy.

== Personal life ==
Goossen is widowed. He has two children, and is a grandfather. He is a Knight in the Order of Orange-Nassau.
