= Frans van Knapen =

Dutch politician

Member of the Senate
- Incumbent
- Assumed office 13 June 2023

Personal details
- Born: 15 December 1948 (age 77) Amersfoort, Netherlands
- Party: BBB (since 2023)
- Children: 3
- Education: Utrecht University; University of Amsterdam

Frans van Knapen (born 15 December 1948) is a Dutch veterinarian, epidemiologist, and politician. He is an emeritus professor of Food Safety and Veterinary Public Health at Utrecht University, where he has worked since 1993. Van Knapen was elected to the Dutch Senate for the Farmer-Citizen Movement on 13 June 2023.

== Early life and academic career ==
Frans van Knapen was born on 15 December 1948 in Amersfoort. Van Knapen studied veterinary medicine at Utrecht University from 1966 to 1973, subsequently working as a veterinarian until 1975, when he became head of the parasitology and mycology laboratory at the National Institute for Public Health and the Environment (RIVM). During his time at the RIVM, Van Knapen's research focused on zoonotic diseases. In 1984, he obtained a doctorate at the University of Amsterdam with a thesis on the immunodiagnosis of toxoplasmosis.

In 1993, Van Knapen became a professor of Epidemiology of Parasitic Zoonoses, and from 1995 a professor of Food Safety and Veterinary Public Health at Utrecht University. Van Knapen became an emeritus professor in 2014. On 26 April 2018, Van Knapen became a commander of the Order of Orange-Nassau.

== Political career ==
Van Knapen has been a member of the Farmer-Citizen Movement (BBB) since 2023. On 13 June 2023, Van Knapen was inaugurated as a member of the Senate. As a senator, Van Knapen has focused on animal welfare, education, and scientific policy. In 2026, Van Knapen was one of three BBB senators to vote against a proposed ban on conversion therapy.

== Personal life ==
Van Knapen has two daughters and one son.
