= Hendrik-Jan Talsma =

Dutch public prosecutor and senator

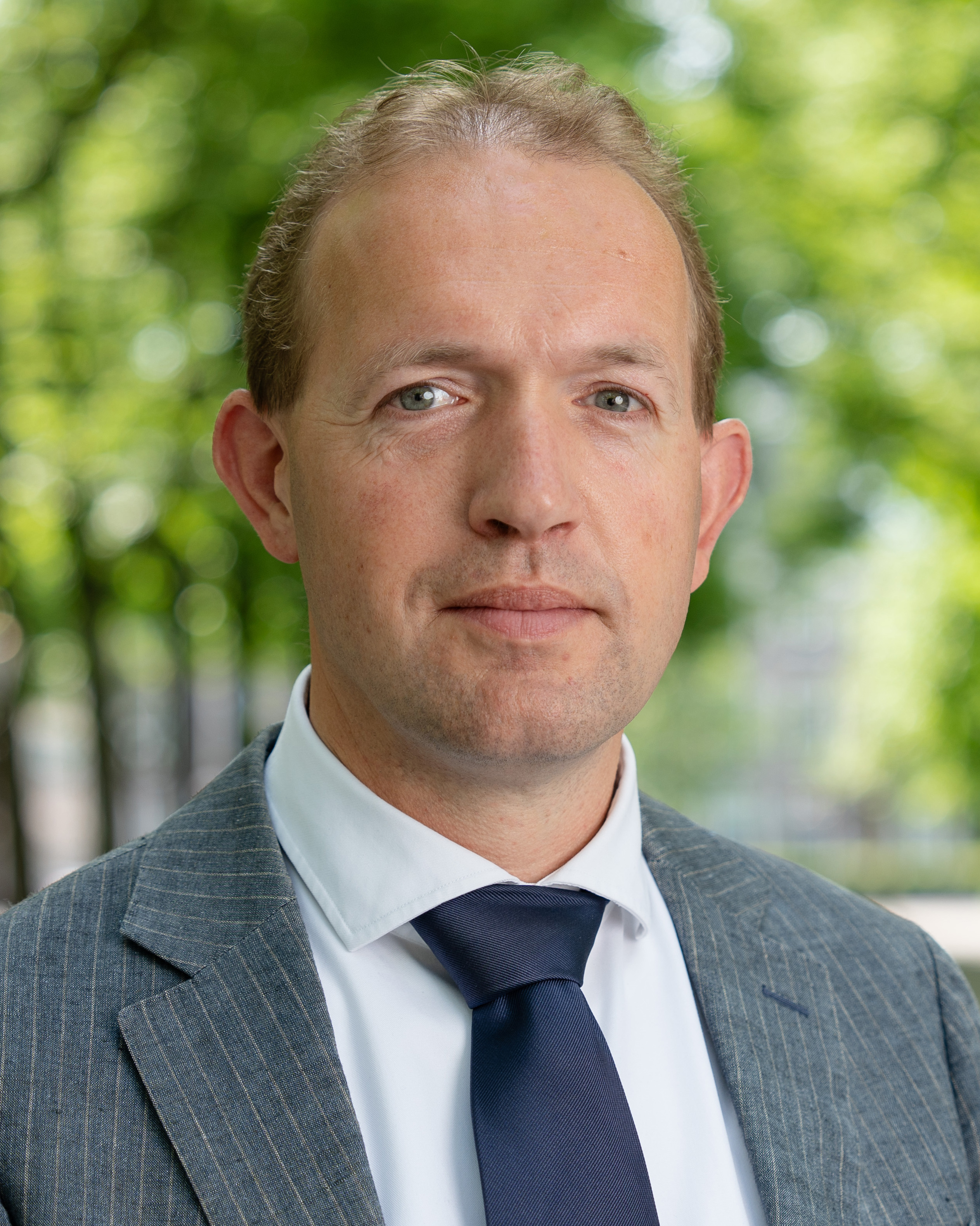
- Talsma in 2023

Member of the Senate
- Incumbent
- Assumed office 6 April 2021
- Preceded by: Mirjam Bikker

Personal details
- Born: Hendrik Jan Jacobus Talsma; 8 July 1978 (age 48) Rotterdam, Netherlands
- Party: Christian Union
- Other political affiliations: Reformatory Political Federation
- Children: 3
- Education: Utrecht University
- Occupation: Public prosecutor; politician

Hendrik Jan Jacobus Talsma (born 8 July 1978) is a Dutch public prosecutor and politician. He became a member of the Senate on behalf of the Christian Union (CU) in April 2021 due to his participation in the 2019 election.

== Early life and career ==
Talsma was born in 1978 in Rotterdam. His father was a pastor in places such as Den Bommel, Harderwijk, Rijssen, Nijkerk, and Putten. Talsma went to the Barneveld secondary school Johannes Fontanus College in the years 1990–97, initially at havo but later at vwo level. He subsequently studied Dutch law at Utrecht University and earned his Master of Laws degree in 2001.

Talsma started his career as a military attorney for the Royal Netherlands Navy and received training to become an officer at the Royal Naval College. He left the military in 2002 to become a public prosecutor trainee at the Training and Study Centre for the Judiciary, but he remained a reserve officer in the rank of captain-lieutenant. He started working at the Public Prosecution Service's national office in 2007, serving as a coordinating public prosecutor for Rijksrecherche cases. Talsma became an advisor and researcher for the government consultancy Necker van Naem next to his job in May 2021 and started researching the integrity of decentral governments. He stepped down from his position as prosecutor upon his appointment to the Senate. In July 2023, Talsma became the ombudsman of the National Police Corps – a position that had been created in 2020.

He has been a volunteer for the Red Cross since 2015 and served as the chair of the Council of Churchwardens of The Hague's Protestant Church from 2016 until 2022.

== Politics ==
Talsma joined the Reformatory Political Federation (RPF), which would eventually merge into the Christian Union, in 1996 and served as vice chair of its youth organization between 1997 and 2000. He also assisted the parliamentary group of RPF/GPV in the Utrecht municipal council in the years 1999–2001. Talsma became chair of the Christian Union in The Hague in 2002. He held that position until 2008 and was also a policy officer focused on the judicial system for the party's parliamentary group in the House of Representatives in the period 2006–07.

Talsma was Christian Union's seventh candidate in the 2015 Senate election, when his party won three seats. It received one more seat in the 2019 election, but Talsma's fifth place on the party list was again insufficient to become a senator. He was appointed to the Senate following the election of Mirjam Bikker to the House of Representatives and was sworn in on 6 April 2021. Talsma is on the Committees for the Interior and High Council of State / General Affairs and Royal Family; for Immigration and Asylum / JHA Council; and for Justice and Security.

He was re-elected in 2023 as the Christian Union's second candidate. The party received three Senate seats. Talsma was chosen Second Vice-President of the Senate on 14 October 2025.

== Personal life ==
He is married, has three children, and lives in The Hague.

== Decorations ==
- King Willem-Alexander Inauguration Medal, 2013 (26 June 2014)
- Officers' Cross (6 December 2016)
