= Koen Petersen =

Dutch politician

Member of the Senate
- Incumbent
- Assumed office 13 June 2023

Personal details
- Born: 18 September 1968 (age 58) Haarlem, Netherlands
- Party: VVD
- Education: University of Amsterdam (1987–1991); Vrije Universiteit Amsterdam (1991–1993)

Koen Petersen (born 18 September 1968) is a Dutch writer, political scientist, and politician. He has been a member of the Dutch Senate for the People's Party for Freedom and Democracy (VVD) since 13 June 2023.

== Early life ==
Koen Petersen was born on 18 September 1968 in Haarlem. He studied political science at the University of Amsterdam from 1987 to 1991, and American studies at the Vrije Universiteit Amsterdam from 1991 to 1993. In 1994, Petersen became manager at Procter & Gamble, becoming director of customer service and outsourcing at Reed Elsevier from 2000 to 2010. Since 2010, Petersen has worked as a freelance change and improvement management, including at Wolters Kluwer from 2011 to 2012. He was director at Jacob Douwe Egberts from 2012 to 2019, and executive at MAAS International B.V. from 2019 to 2024.

Petersen has also been active as a writer, analyst, and public speaker focusing on American affairs, including for Elsevier Weekblad since 2012. He has published three books on American politics from 2020 to 2024.

== Political career ==
From 1992 to 1994, Petersen was chairperson of the Youth Organisation Freedom and Democracy (JOVD), having become involved in the organization in the 1980s and having previously been editor-in-chief of its publication De Driemaster from 1991 to 1992. Throughout the late 1990s to 2010s, Petersen participated in internal VVD policy commissions and chaired the VVD branch in Amsterdam from 2010 to 2014.

Petersen became a member of the Senate for the People's Party for Freedom and Democracy (VVD) on 13 June 2023. As a senator, Petersen chairs the Senate Committee on Foreign Affairs, Defense and Development Cooperation, and focuses on social affairs, economic affairs, and climate policy.

== Personal life ==
Petersen is a personal friend of Mark Rutte. He lives in Amsterdam.
