= Tekke Panman =

Dutch politician

Member of the Senate
- Incumbent
- Assumed office 13 June 2023

Personal details
- Born: 17 June 1968 (age 58) Amersfoort, Netherlands
- Party: BBB (since 2023)
- Children: 3
- Education: University of Groningen (1991–1995)

Tekke Panman (born 17 June 1968) is a Dutch manager and politician. He has been a member of the Dutch Senate for the Farmer-Citizen Movement (BBB) since 13 June 2023.

== Early life ==
Tekke Panman was born on 17 June 1968 in Winschoten. He grew up in rural Flevoland in a farming family, where he became active in the local Youth Organisation Freedom and Democracy (JOVD), a youth organization linked to the People's Party for Freedom and Democracy (VVD). After studying agricultural business management at Aeres College Dronten from 1986 to 1990, Panman attended the University of Groningen from 1991 to 1995, where he studied business management. Panman worked as a program and project manager at Capgemini from 1995 to 2012, and as interim manager at MoveBeyond from 2012 to 2018. He has also worked as a freelance manager since 2015. Panman was manager at Tata Steel Europe from 2018 to 2020, and at Lely Industries, an agricultural equipment manufacturer, until 2022.

== Political career ==
Panman became a member of the Senate on 13 June 2023 for the Farmer-Citizen Movement (BBB). As a senator, Panman focuses on the environment and the European Union.

Panman has been a member of the Parliamentary Assembly of the Council of Europe since 6 March 2024. He served as an election monitor during the 2024 Georgian parliamentary election for the Organization for Security and Co-operation in Europe (OSCE).

== Personal life ==
Panman is married, and has one son and two daughters.
