= Progressief Nederland =

Dutch political party

Progressive Netherlands Progressief Nederland
- Abbreviation: Pro
- Leader: Jesse Klaver
- Leader in the House of Representatives: Jesse Klaver
- Leader in the Senate: Paul Rosenmöller
- Founded: 1 July 2026
- Merger of: GroenLinks; Labour Party
- Preceded by: GroenLinks–PvdA
- Youth wing: Protest
- Membership (2026): >100,000 (claimed)
- Ideology: Social democracy Green politics
- Political position: Centre-left to left-wing
- Regional affiliation: Socialists, Greens and Democrats
- European affiliation: Party of European Socialists
- European Parliament group: Progressive Alliance of Socialists and Democrats; Greens–European Free Alliance
- Colours: Red; Green; Pink; Mint green
- House of Representatives: 20 / 150
- Senate: 14 / 75
- European Parliament: 8 / 31
- Provincial councils: 103 / 572 (Note: Sum of councillors elected for GroenLinks, PvdA, and GroenLinks–PvdA at the 2023 provincial election)
- Municipal Councils: 1,051 / 8,523 (Note: Sum of councillors elected for GroenLinks, PvdA, and GroenLinks–PvdA at the 2026 municipal election)
- Benelux Parliament: 2 / 21

Website
- progressiefnederland.nl

Progressief Nederland (lit. 'Progressive Netherlands'; abbreviated Pro, stylised in all caps) is a Dutch social democratic and green political party positioned on the centre-left to left-wing of the political spectrum. The party was formed on 1 July 2026 as a merger of GroenLinks and the Labour Party, which had previously cooperated in joint parliamentary groups and electoral lists as GroenLinks–PvdA (GL–PvdA). The leader of the party is Jesse Klaver, a member of the house of representatives and former leader of GroenLinks.

== Background ==
The party is a merger of the Labour Party (Dutch: Partij van de Arbeid; PvdA) and GroenLinks (lit. 'GreenLeft'; GL). PvdA was formed on 2 February 1946 as a merger of three pre-war parties — the Social Democratic Workers' Party (SDAP), the Free-thinking Democratic League (VDB), and the Christian Democratic Union (CDU) — and had participated in thirteen government coalitions and produced three Prime Ministers. GroenLinks was formed on 24 November 1990 as a political party, formally merging the Pacifist Socialist Party (PSP), Communist Party of the Netherlands (CPN), Political Party of Radicals (PPR), and the Evangelical People's Party (EVP); these parties had formed an alliance for the 1989 European Parliament election known as Rainbow, and had renamed the alliance to GroenLinks for the 1989 general election.

The PvdA and GL merging is not the first time two or more major Dutch left-of-centre political parties had explored the idea of merging. As early as 2004, Job Cohen, then the mayor of Amsterdam and later PvdA national leader, called for a merger of the PvdA, GL, and Socialist Party (SP), suggesting "Progressive People's Party" (Dutch: Progressieve Volkspartij) as possible name. That name refers to a 1970s proposal with the same name which would have merged the PvdA, Democrats 66 (D66), and the PPR, one of GL's forerunners, into a single party. On both occasions, discussions surrounding potential mergers never progressed past preliminary stages.

== History ==
Following the heavy defeat of the PvdA in the 2017 general election, in which the party went from 25 per cent to less than six per cent of the vote, losing 29 seats, discussions about a possible merger began to rise again. With this electoral demise, the left-of-centre political landscape in the Netherlands — including D66, GL, SP, the Party for the Animals, Christian Union, Volt Netherlands, DENK and BIJ1 — fragmented. In both the 2017 and 2021 general elections, there was no left-leaning party big enough to be the main contender to Prime Minister Mark Rutte's People's Party for Freedom and Democracy (VVD) from the left. Many left-leaning voters in the Netherlands have a habit of voting tactically for the largest left-leaning force in an attempt to prevent a right-leaning party from becoming the largest party.

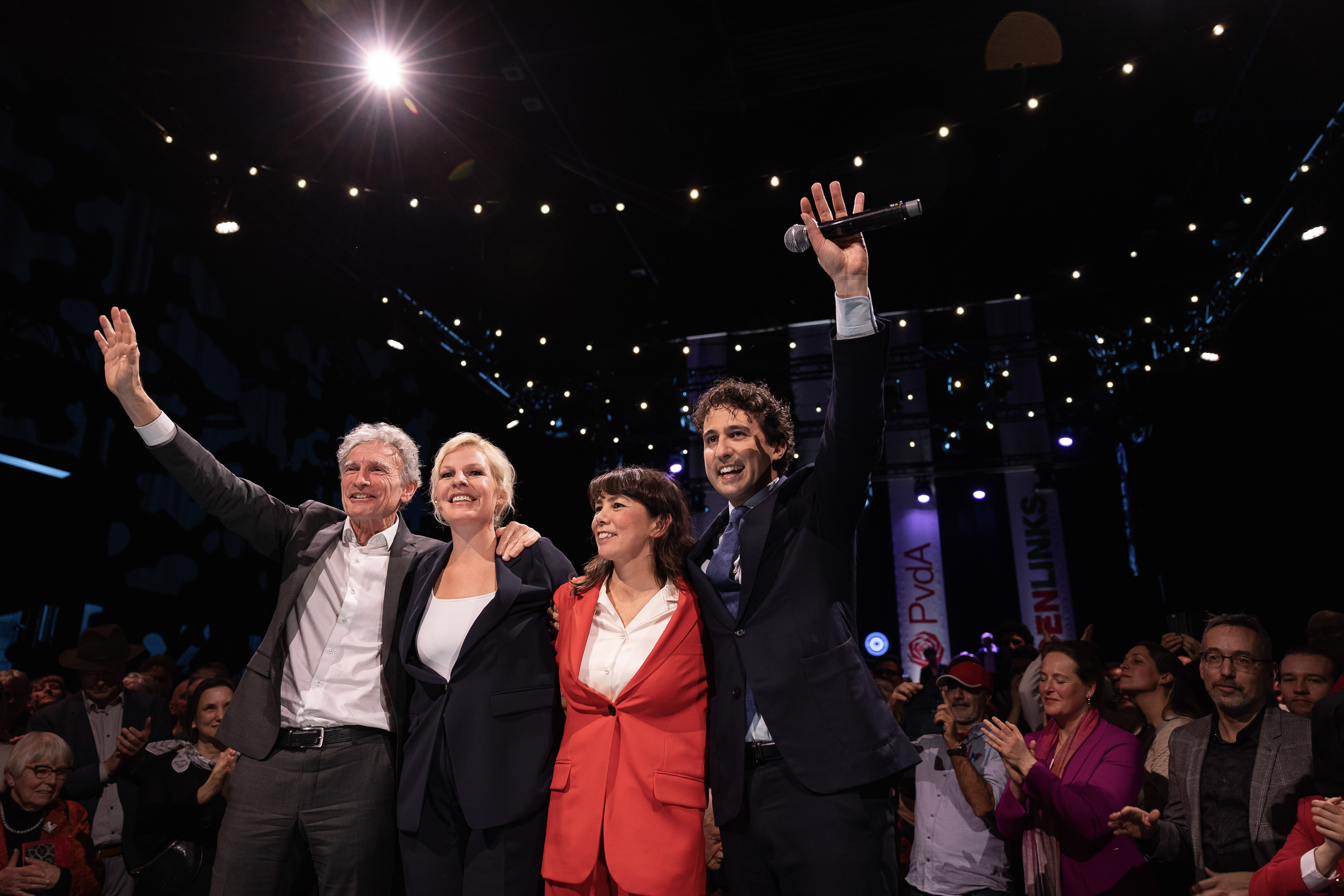
GroenLinks leader Jesse Klaver (right) and lead candidate for the Senate Paul Rosenmöller (left), and Labour Party leader Attje Kuiken and lead candidate for the Senate Mei Li Vos (centre) in 2023

During the 2021–2022 cabinet formation, party leaders Lilianne Ploumen (PvdA) and Jesse Klaver (GL) indicated that they only wanted to join a coalition government if the other party also joined, thereby forming an alliance in the negotiations. In August 2021, PvdA members passed multiple motions tabled by the Red-Green movement that forced the party to not enter government without GL and further steps to strengthen the cooperation. Following their exclusion from the fourth Rutte cabinet, the Labour Party and GroenLinks decided to intensify co-operation as opposition parties. The parties formed a joint list in Zeeland for the 2023 provincial elections, and following the 2023 Senate election the parties formed a joint group in the Senate.

Following the collapse of the fourth Rutte cabinet, PvdA leader Attje Kuiken and Klaver announced that they intended to run in the 2023 general election on a joint list, named GroenLinks–PvdA (GL–PvdA). Both parties' memberships endorsed this move in a referendum. The PvdA's Frans Timmermans was endorsed as lead candidate by both parties. GL–PvdA finished the election with 25 seats and 15.75% of the vote, finishing second to the right-wing Party for Freedom (PVV) but ahead of the governing People's Party for Freedom and Democracy (VVD). Timmermans ruled out forming a government with PVV and VVD, and admitted that it was "extremely unlikely" that GL–PvdA would be in cabinet, and the alliance ended up as opposition to the Schoof cabinet.

Led by GroenLinks politician Bas Eickhout into the 2024 European Parliament election, the GroenLinks–PvdA list won, placing itself first among Dutch parties with 21.0% of the vote and eight seats.

On 13 March 2025, it was announced that members of the parties would be able to vote for a decision in principle about founding a new left and green party on 21 June 2025. The referendum was brought forward to between 5 and 12 June 2025 after the fall of the Schoof cabinet on 3 June. On 12 June 2025, it was announced that GL and PvdA would merge into a new party in 2026, with 89.1% of GL voters and 88.0% of PvdA voters voting in favour. GL–PvdA contested the 2025 general election as a joint list, but the alliance lost five seats and fell back to fourth overall; PvdA leader Frans Timmermans resigned following the results.

On 26 March 2026, the party revealed its new name and logo as Progressief Nederland. At the event, Klaver described the party as "pro-fair, pro-green, pro-social, pro-progress". Klaver expressed hope that GL−PvdA groups in municipal councils would also immediately switch to the new name. In municipalities where GL and PvdA still operate as separate council groups, they may retain their former party names until the next municipal elections. On 9 June, the GL–PvdA group in the House of Representatives officially renamed itself Progressief Nederland. On 13 June, 96% of GL members and 97% of PvdA members voted to dissolve their parties and merge at a founding congress in 's-Hertogenbosch, with 1 July announced as the formal date of merger. On 1 July, several GL–PvdA council groups formally merged as well.

== European affiliation ==
Since the 2024 European eletions, Progressief Nederland has eight members of the European Parliament, four each from PvdA and GroenLinks. The former PvdA members will continue to sit until 2029 in the Progressive Alliance of Socialists and Democrats group (S&D), and the former GroenLinks members will continue to sit as members of the Greens–European Free Alliance (Greens/EFA) group.

On 23 July, the party leadership announced a referendum wherein more than 100,000 members of Progressief Nederland would be able to vote on the party's European identity. The European rules allow full membership of one of the two groups; or associate membership of both. PvdA was historically a member of the Party of European Socialists (PES), while GroenLinks was a founding member of the European Green Party.

An analysis of the political positions of Progressief Nederland, the European Greens, and the PES by political scientist Simon Otjes in Stuk Rood Vlees concluded that Progressief Nederland was closer to the European Greens on most of the dimensions examined, including climate policy, European integration, economic policy, LGBT rights, relations with Russia and the rule of law. The main area in which Pro was closer to the PES was migration. The analysis also found that, when the European Greens and the PES voted differently, the Pro delegation had voted with the Greens in approximately two out of three cases. On 2 September, Nieuwsuur reported that the eight Pro members of the European Parliament were evenly divided.

On 21 August, an advisory committee told Pro members that they should vote for the PES. Party leader Jesse Klaver publicly endorsed the recommendation, saying that he "embraced" it. His position was subsequently criticised by Pro members of both GroenLinks and PvdA affiliation, who accused him and the party leadership of interference in the independent choice of the members. On 24 August, Trouw published a editorial comment explicitly arguing that Pro should look beyond short-term political power when choosing its European affiliation. The editorial also criticised the Pro party leadership for telling members which way they should vote.

On 12 September, several prominent European Green leaders met with Progressief Nederland members at the Amsterdam Climate March. At a European Green Party press conference during the march, Green representatives argued that Europe is the world's fastest-heating continent and that the effects of the climate crisis fall disproportionately on people who are least responsible for it. They linked the climate emergency to the need for progressive political alliances and welcomed the creation of Pro as a party seeking to place climate policy at the centre of Dutch politics.

On 25 September, 65% of party members voted in favour of joining PES over the European Green Party. A party spokesperson said that the Pro's four MEPs in Greens/EFA will likely remain in their current groups until the 2029 European election.
