= Karin van Bijsterveld =

Dutch politician

Member of the Senate
- Incumbent
- Assumed office June 13, 2023

Personal details
- Born: Karin van Bijsterveld; 8 March 1970 (age 56) The Hague, Netherlands
- Party: JA21
- Children: 3

Karin van Bijsterveld (born March 8, 1970) is a Dutch lawyer, sports administrator and politician of the JA21 party who has served as a Member of the Senate since 2023 and is leader of JA21's faction in the Senate.

== Biography ==
Van Bijsterveld was born in The Hague. After completing law studies at Leiden University she worked as an independent lawyer focusing on mediation and has served on the board various sporting organizations. She served as the chairwoman of the Royal Dutch Lawn Tennis Association and she has been chair of the supervisory board of the Recreation Board of North Holland since 2018. Van Bijsterveld has been a member of the Dutch Senate since June 13, 2023. She has also been the chair of the JA21 parliamentary group since November 6, 2025.
