= Gaby Perin-Gopie =

Dutch politician (born 1986)

Leader of Volt Netherlands in the Senate (Netherlands)
- Incumbent
- Assumed office 13 June 2023

Member of the Senate (Netherlands)
- Incumbent
- Assumed office 13 June 2023

Personal details
- Born: 29 October 1986 (age 40)
- Party: Volt Netherlands
- Children: 3
- Education: master's degree in psychology
- Alma mater: Leiden University

Gaby K. Perin-Gopie (born 29 October 1986) is a Dutch politician. She has been the Senate leader of Volt Netherlands since 13 June 2023.

== Biography ==
Perin-Gopie grew up in Zoetermeer and currently resides in The Hague. She studied psychology at Leiden University from 2005 to 2009 and graduated with a master's degree. Since May 2022, she has been chairperson for the healthcare sector in the Christian National Trade Union Federation. Prior to that, she worked as a policy officer for the Ministry of Education, Culture and Science and the Ministry of Health, Welfare and Sport.

Perin-Gopie was the lead candidate for Volt Netherlands in the 2023 Senate election and has been a member of the Senate and parliamentary leader for her party since 13 June 2023.

She is a member of the following Senate committees:

- Internal Affairs
- College of Group Chairmen
- Economy and Climate
- Immigration and Asylum / Justice and Home Affairs of the European Union
- Agriculture, Nature and Food Quality
- Education, Culture and Science
- Social Affairs and Employment
- Public Health, Welfare and Sport

== Personal life ==
Perin-Gopie is married and has two sons and a daughter.
