= 2023 Dutch Senate election =

- 30 May 2023
- All 75 seats in the Senate; 38 seats needed for a majority
Party	Leader	Vote %	Seats	+/–
BBB	Ilona Lagas	20.66	16	New
VVD	Edith Schippers	12.40	10	−2
GL (Note: GroenLinks and the Labour Party took part in the election with separate lists, but intend to form a joint Senate group.)	Paul Rosenmöller	9.67	7	−1
PvdA	Mei Li Vos	8.86	7	+1
CDA	Theo Bovens	7.34	6	−3
D66	Paul van Meenen	6.23	5	−2
PVV	Marjolein Faber	6.10	4	−1
PvdD	Niko Koffeman	4.78	3	0
JA21	Annabel Nanninga	4.63	3	New
SP	Tiny Kox	4.14	3	−1
CU	Tineke Huizinga	3.68	3	−1
FVD	Johan Dessing	2.72	2	−10
Volt	Gaby Perin-Gopie	2.70	2	New
SGP	Peter Schalk	2.48	2	0
50PLUS	Martin van Rooijen	1.82	1	−1
OPNL	Auke van der Goot	1.78	1	0
This lists parties that won seats. See the complete results below.
President of the Senate before	President of the Senate after
Jan Anthonie Bruijn; VVD	Jan Anthonie Bruijn; VVD

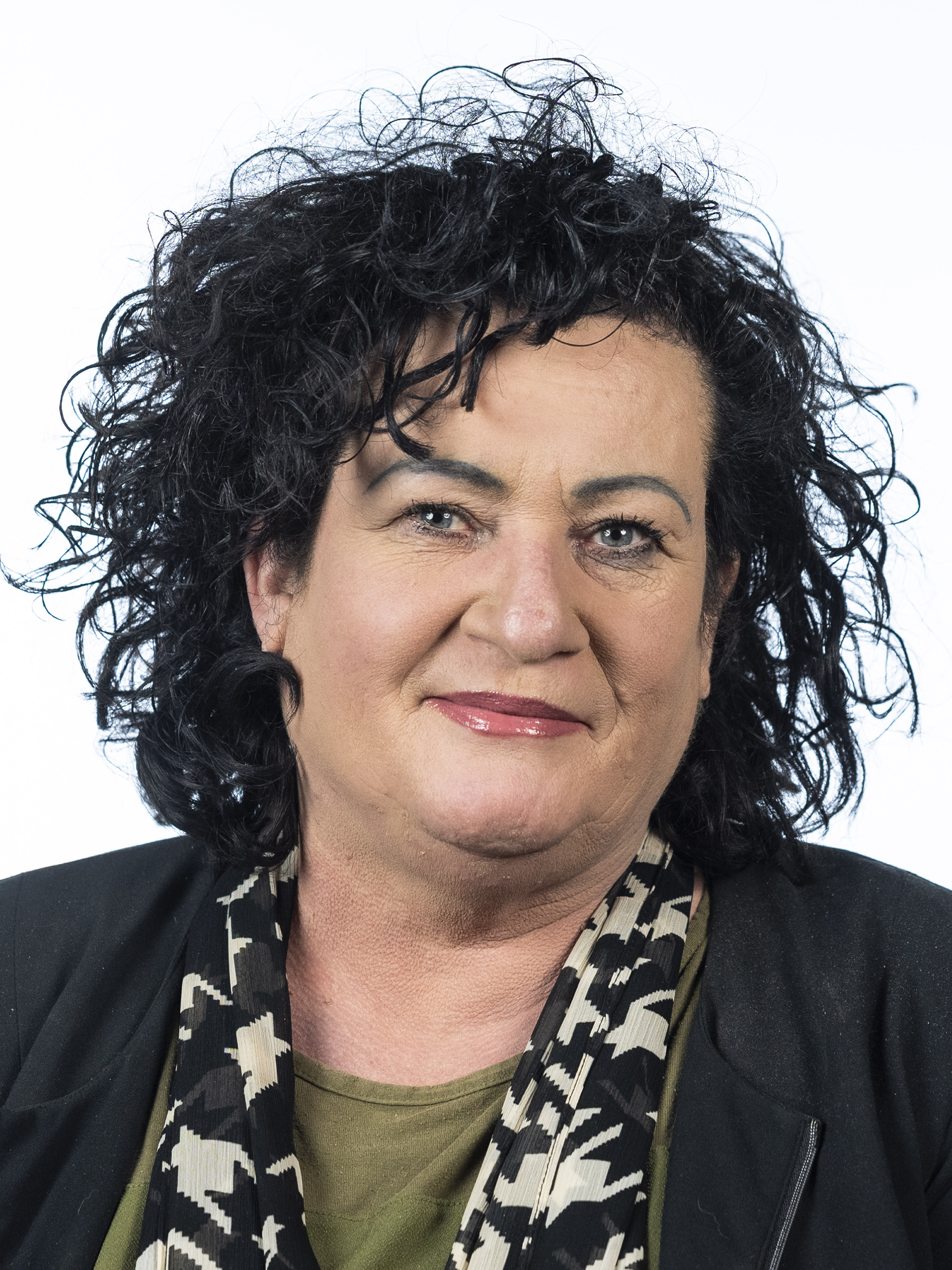

An election to the Dutch Senate was held on 30 May 2023. The 75 members of the Senate were elected by members of the provincial councils and electoral colleges elected two months earlier in provincial and electoral college elections.

The four coalition parties saw their combined seat count decrease from 32 to 24. The Farmer–Citizen Movement (BBB), which had come first in the provincial elections, entered the Senate with 16 seats. The Labour Party and GroenLinks, which intend to form a joint parliamentary group, won a combined 14 seats.

== Background ==
From 2017, the Netherlands had had coalition governments consisting of the People's Party for Freedom and Democracy (VVD), Democrats 66 (D66), the Christian Democratic Appeal (CDA) and the Christian Union (CU). In the 2019 Senate election, this coalition lost its majority in the Senate, holding 32 seats. Being 6 seats short of a majority made it necessary for the government to seek cooperation with opposition parties such as the Labour Party (PvdA), GroenLinks and JA21 in order to get legislation through the Senate. The coalition parties were long expected to lose more seats in the 2023 Senate election, which would make it more difficult for the government to find majorities for important legislation.

In June 2022, members of the PvdA and GroenLinks voted in favour of the formation of a joint Senate group after the 2023 election. This made the election an important step for the GroenLinks–PvdA alliance.

From 2019, the government had had the intention to limit the human impact on the nitrogen cycle. Its nitrogen bill had met resistance from several opposition parties including the Farmer–Citizen Movement (BBB), which was founded in 2019 and entered the House of Representatives with one seat in 2021. With BBB expected to become a significant force in the Senate after the 2023 election, the government was expected to look to the left for support. However, in early March 2023, PvdA and GroenLinks, as well as other left-wing parties, also announced their intention to vote against the nitrogen bill in the Senate. The government was also expected to face difficulty finding majorities for its climate legislation and its Dispersal Act concerning the distribution of asylum seekers.

The government was therefore expected to have to make concessions to opposition parties on these pieces of legislation. However, voters of coalition parties were divided over the question whether the government should turn "left" or "right" in search of support for its legislation. A March 2023 poll showed that a majority of D66 voters wanted the government to cooperate with GroenLinks–PvdA, while a majority of VVD and CDA voters would preferred for the government to cooperate with BBB.

== Electoral system ==
The Senate consists of 75 members elected every four years by the members of the provincial councils of the country's twelve provinces, and, following law changes in 2017 and 2022, electoral colleges representing the special municipalities of Bonaire, Sint Eustatius and Saba and Dutch nationals living abroad, who are in turn elected directly by the citizens two months earlier in the 2023 provincial and electoral college elections.

The weight of each elector's vote is determined by the population of the province or special municipality which the elector represents, at a ratio of approximately 1 vote per 100 residents. The seats are distributed in one nationwide constituency using party-list proportional representation.

=== Electors ===
Party or alliance		Popular Vote	Provincial councils												Electoral colleges				Total	+/−
Party or alliance		Popular Vote	DR	FL	FR	GE	GR	LI	NB	NH	OV	UT	ZE	ZH	NI	BO	SA	SE	Total	+/−
Farmer–Citizen Movement		1,488,372	17	10	14	14	12	10	11	8	17	7	9	8	—	—	—	—	137	New
GL–PvdA	GroenLinks (Note: Includes 3 out of 6 members of the GroenLinks–PvdA group in the Provincial Council of Zeeland.)	699,531 (Note: Does not include votes cast for the GroenLinks–PvdA joint list in Zeeland.)	2	3	3	5	5	4	5	7	4	7	3	6	5	—	—	—	59	−2
GL–PvdA	Labour Party	632,112	4	3	5	5	5	3	4	7	3	3	3	4	2	—	—	—	51	−2
GL–PvdA	Total	1,356,180 (Note: Includes votes cast for the GroenLinks–PvdA joint list in Zeeland.)	6	6	8	10	10	7	9	14	7	10	6	10	7	0	0	0	110	−4
People's Party for Freedom and Democracy		869,954	4	4	3	6	2	5	9	8	4	6	4	8	4	—	—	—	67	−13
Christian Democratic Appeal		516,312	3	2	4	4	2	5	4	2	4	4	5	4	1	—	—	1	45	−27
Democrats 66		496,161	1	2	1	3	2	3	4	4	2	5	1	4	4	—	—	—	36	−5
Party for Freedom		446,301	2	3	2	2	2	6	4	3	2	2	2	4	—	—	—	—	34	−6
Party for the Animals		376,357	2	2	1	2	2	2	2	4	1	3	1	3	2	—	—	—	27	+7
JA21		343,313	1	2	1	2	—	2	2	3	2	2	1	4	2	—	—	—	24	New
Socialist Party		330,086	2	2	1	2	2	3	4	2	1	1	1	2	1	—	—	—	24	−11
CU–SGP	Christian Union (Note: Includes 1 member of the ChristenUnie–SGP group in the Provincial Council of North Brabant.)	283,986 (Note: Does not include votes cast for the Christian Union – Reformed Political Party joint list in North Brabant.)	2	2	2	3	3	—	1	1	3	3	1	2	—	—	—	—	23	−9
CU–SGP	Reformed Political Party	196,150	—	2	—	3	—	—	—	—	2	2	5	2	—	—	—	—	16	+2
CU–SGP	Total	497,508 (Note: Includes votes cast for the Christian Union – Reformed Political Party joint list in North Brabant.)	2	4	2	6	3	0	1	1	5	5	6	4	0	0	0	0	39	−7
Forum for Democracy		239,726	1	2	1	1	1	1	1	2	1	1	1	2	2	—	—	—	17	−69
OPNL	Frisian National Party	27,298	—	—	4	—	—	—	—	—	—	—	—	—	—	—	—	—	4	0
OPNL	Groninger Belang	17,385	—	—	—	—	3	—	—	—	—	—	—	—	—	—	—	—	3	0
OPNL	Lokaal Brabant	45,723	—	—	—	—	—	—	2	—	—	—	—	—	—	—	—	—	2	+1
OPNL	Lokaal Limburg	20,128	—	—	—	—	—	2	—	—	—	—	—	—	—	—	—	—	2	0
OPNL	Party for Zeeland	8,458	—	—	—	—	—	—	—	—	—	—	2	—	—	—	—	—	2	0
OPNL	Party for the North	8,331	—	—	—	—	1	—	—	—	—	—	—	—	—	—	—	—	1	−1
OPNL	Provinciaal Belang Fryslân	6,891	—	—	1	—	—	—	—	—	—	—	—	—	—	—	—	—	1	+1
OPNL	Sterk Lokaal Drenthe	7,485	1	—	—	—	—	—	—	—	—	—	—	—	—	—	—	—	1	0
OPNL	Sterk Lokaal Flevoland	4,518	—	1	—	—	—	—	—	—	—	—	—	—	—	—	—	—	1	New
OPNL	Total	182,291 (Note: Includes votes cast for all OPNL parties, even those which did not obtain any electors, as well as for the Party for the North, which joined the OPNL alliance after the Provincial elections but before the Senate elections.)	1	1	5	0	4	2	2	0	0	0	2	0	0	0	0	0	17	+2
Volt Netherlands		234,975	1	—	—	2	1	—	1	2	1	2	—	1	2	—	—	—	13	New
50PLUS		178,492	—	1	—	1	—	1	1	2	—	1	—	1	—	—	—	—	8	−9
Windward Islands People's Movement		496	—	—	—	—	—	—	—	—	—	—	—	—	—	—	5	—	5	+1
Democratic Party of Sint Eustatius		582	—	—	—	—	—	—	—	—	—	—	—	—	—	—	—	4	4	−1
Bonaire Democratic Party		3,212	—	—	—	—	—	—	—	—	—	—	—	—	—	3	—	—	3	0
Bonaire Patriotic Union		2,275	—	—	—	—	—	—	—	—	—	—	—	—	—	2	—	—	2	0
Bonaire People's Movement		1,451	—	—	—	—	—	—	—	—	—	—	—	—	—	2	—	—	2	−2
Independent Jaap Kos		892 (Note: Represents only votes cast for the Jaap Kos list in the Bonaire electoral college; does not include votes cast for the Eelco Fiole list in the expatriates' electoral college.)	—	—	—	—	—	—	—	—	—	—	—	—	—	1	—	—	1	New
Movement 21		816	—	—	—	—	—	—	—	—	—	—	—	—	—	1	—	—	1	New
Others		225,411 (Note: Represents votes cast for all parties and lists which did not obtain any electors, other than OPNL member parties.)	—	—	—	—	—	—	—	—	—	—	—	—	—	—	—	—	0	−5 (Note: 4 from DENK and 1 from the Saba Labour Party.)
Total		7,791,163	43	41	43	55	43	47	55	55	47	49	39	55	25	9	5	5	616	+27
Weight per vote			117	109	153	388	139	240	478	537	252	283	100	692	20	27	4	7		
Total weighted votes			5,031	4,469	6,579	21,340	5,977	11,280	26,290	29,535	11,844	13,867	3,900	38,060	500	243	20	35	178,970	+5,295

== Participating parties ==
The following parties were due to participate in the 2023 Senate election:

List	Party		Lead candidate	2019 result
1	Forum for Democracy	FvD	Johan Dessing	15.87% (12 seats)
2	People's Party for Freedom and Democracy	VVD	Edith Schippers	15.11% (12 seats)
3	Christian Democratic Appeal	CDA	Theo Bovens	11.41% (9 seats)
4	GroenLinks	GL	Paul Rosenmöller	11.18% (8 seats)
5	Democrats 66	D66	Paul van Meenen	8.75% (7 seats)
6	Labour Party	PvdA	Mei Li Vos	8.62% (6 seats)
7	Party for Freedom	PVV	Marjolein Faber	6.53% (5 seats)
8	Socialist Party	SP	Tiny Kox	5.88% (4 seats)
9	Christian Union	CU	Tineke Huizinga	5.03% (4 seats)
10	Party for the Animals	PvdD	Niko Koffeman	3.78% (3 seats)
11	50PLUS	50+	Martin van Rooijen	3.03% (2 seats)
12	Reformed Political Party	SGP	Peter Schalk	2.60% (2 seats)
13	Independent Politics Netherlands	OPNL	Auke van der Goot	1.31% (1 seat)
14	JA21	JA21	Annabel Nanninga	—
15	Farmer–Citizen Movement	BBB	Ilona Lagas	—
16	Volt Netherlands	VOLT	Gaby Perin-Gopie	—

== Seat projections ==
The table and graphs below show seat projections for the Senate election. Projections before the provincial and electoral college elections on 15 March are based on opinion polling for the provincial elections. The 15 March projection is based on exit polls of the provincial elections, while the 19 March projection by ANP is based on preliminary results of the provincial and electoral college elections.

Seat projections for the 2023 Senate election
Polling firm	Fieldwork date	Sample size	BBB	GL	PvdA	VVD	CDA	D66	PVV	PvdD	SP	JA21	FvD	CU	50+	SGP	OPNL	Volt	Denk	Others	Ref
2023 election	30 May 2023	N/A	16	7	7	10	6	5	4	3	3	3	2	3	1	2	1	2	0	0	
ANP	19 Mar 2023	N/A (Note: Based on preliminary results of the provincial and electoral college elections, with 99% of votes counted.)	17	8	7	10	5	5	5	4	3	3	2	2	1	1	1	1	0	0	
Ipsos	15 Mar 2023	N/A (Note: Based on exit polls of the provincial elections.)	15	8	7	10	5	6	4	4	3	3	2	3	1	1	1	2	0	0	
Ipsos	10–14 Mar 2023	2,002	13	8	6	12	5	4	8	4	5	3	2	2	1	1	0	1	0	0	
Peil.nl	10–11 Mar 2023	3,000+	12	14		12	4	7	8	4	3	3	2	3	0	1	1	1	0	0	
I&O	2–6 Mar 2023	8,196	13	14		10	3	5	7	5	4	5	2	2	0	2	1	2	0	0	
Peil.nl	3–4 Mar 2023	3,000+	10	14		12	5	7	8	3	4	3	3	3	0	1	1	1	0	0	
Ipsos	17–27 Feb 2023	5,291	9	8	5	15	5	6	9	4	5	3	2	2	0	1	0	1	0	0	
Peil.nl	17–18 Feb 2023	3,000+	8	13		13	5	6	9	4	4	5	2	3	0	1	1	1	0	0	
Ipsos	10–13 Feb 2023	1,961	8	6	5	15	5	7	9	4	4	3	2	2	0	2	1	1	1	0	
Peil.nl	27–28 Jan 2023	3,000+	7	13		12	4	6	9	4	3	6	3	3	0	2	1	2	0	0	
Peil.nl	11–12 Nov 2022	3,000+	6	13		11	3	6	10	4	4	7	2	3	—	—	—	—	—	6	
2019 election	27 May 2019	N/A	—	8	6	12	9	7	5	3	4	—	12	4	2	2	1	—	0	0	

== Results ==
As projected, the Farmer–Citizen Movement became the largest party, winning 16 seats (as opposed to the projected 17). Strategic voting of D66 and VVD electors resulted in extra seats for their coalition partners CDA and CU. Moreover, compared to the projections, GroenLinks lost one seat to Volt as GroenLinks elector Debora Fernald voted for Volt.

With the coalition parties winning 24 seats in the Senate, an additional 14 opposition votes are necessary for a 38 vote majority. Support from either BBB (16) or GroenLinks–PvdA (14) suffices.

Party	Unweighted vote			Weighted vote			Seats			
Party	Votes	Deviation	%	Votes	%	±pp	Quotient	Remainder	Total	+/−
Farmer–Citizen Movement	137	±0	22.24	36,976	20.66	New	15	1	16	New
People's Party for Freedom and Democracy	67	±0	10.88	22,194	12.40	−2.71	9	1	10	−2
GroenLinks	55	−4	8.93	17,313	9.67	−1.51	7	0	7	−1
Labour Party	68	+17	11.04	15,862	8.86	+0.24	6	1	7	+1
Christian Democratic Appeal	47	+2	7.63	13,136	7.34	−4.07	5	1	6	−3
Democrats 66	37	+1	6.01	11,144	6.23	−2.52	4	1	5	−2
Party for Freedom	34	±0	5.52	10,922	6.10	−0.43	4	0	4	−1
Party for the Animals	27	±0	4.38	8,560	4.78	+1.00	3	0	3	0
JA21	24	±0	3.90	8,289	4.63	New	3	0	3	New
Socialist Party	24	±0	3.90	7,404	4.14	−1.74	3	0	3	−1
Christian Union	23	±0	3.73	6,595	3.68	−1.35	2	1	3	−1
Forum for Democracy	17	±0	2.76	4,866	2.72	−13.15	2	0	2	−10
Volt	14	+1	2.27	4,826	2.70	New	2	0	2	New
Reformed Political Party	17	+1	2.76	4,436	2.48	−0.12	1	1	2	0
50PLUS	8	±0	1.30	3,264	1.82	−1.21	1	0	1	−1
Independent Politics Netherlands	17	±0	2.76	3,183	1.78	+0.47	1	0	1	0
Total	616	+18	100.00	178,970	100.00	—	68	7	75	0
Source: Kiesraad
