= Senate (Netherlands) =

Upper house of the States General

Senate Eerste Kamer der Staten-Generaal
- States General of the Netherlands

Type
- Type: Upper house

Leadership
- President: Mei Li Vos, PRO since 7 October 2025
- First Vice President: Boris Dittrich, D66 since 14 October 2025
- Second Vice President: Hendrik-Jan Talsma, CU since 14 October 2025

Structure
- Seats: 75
- Political groups: Government (Jetten cabinet) (22): VVD (9); D66 (7); CDA (6); Opposition (53): PRO (14); BBB (11); PVV (4); SP (3); CU (3); FvD (3); JA21 (2); SGP (2); Volt (2); 50PLUS (1); OPNL (1); PvdD (1) (Note: The PvdD group in the Senate cut its ties with the Party for the Animals in November 2025. Since 7 November 2025, the party is de facto represented by the independent member Ingrid Visseren-Hamakers.); Independents (6)
- Length of term: 4 years

Elections
- Voting system: Indirect party-list proportional
- Last election: 30 May 2023
- Next election: May 2027

Meeting place
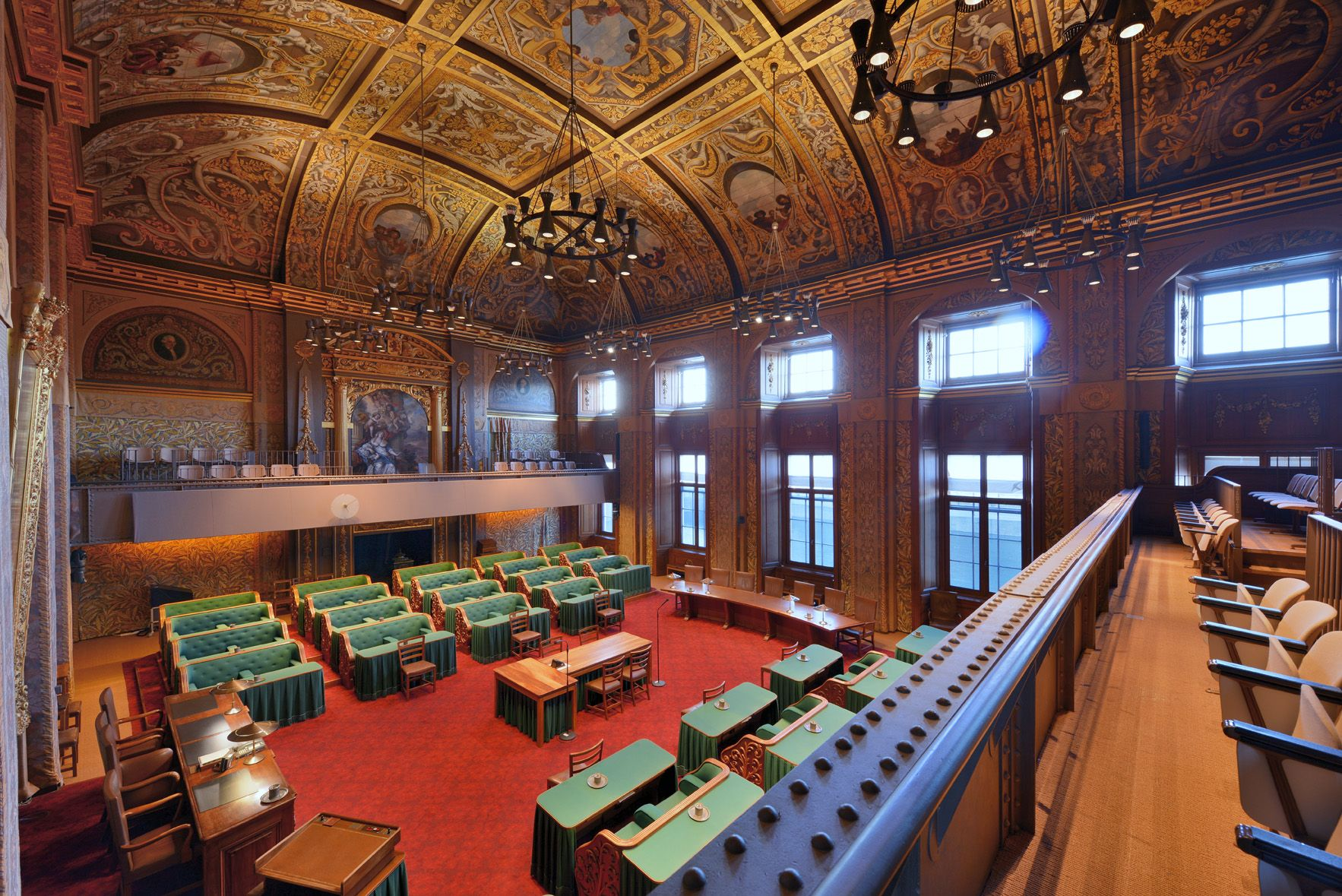
- Plenary Hall of the Senate, Binnenhof, The Hague (closed due to ongoing renovations)
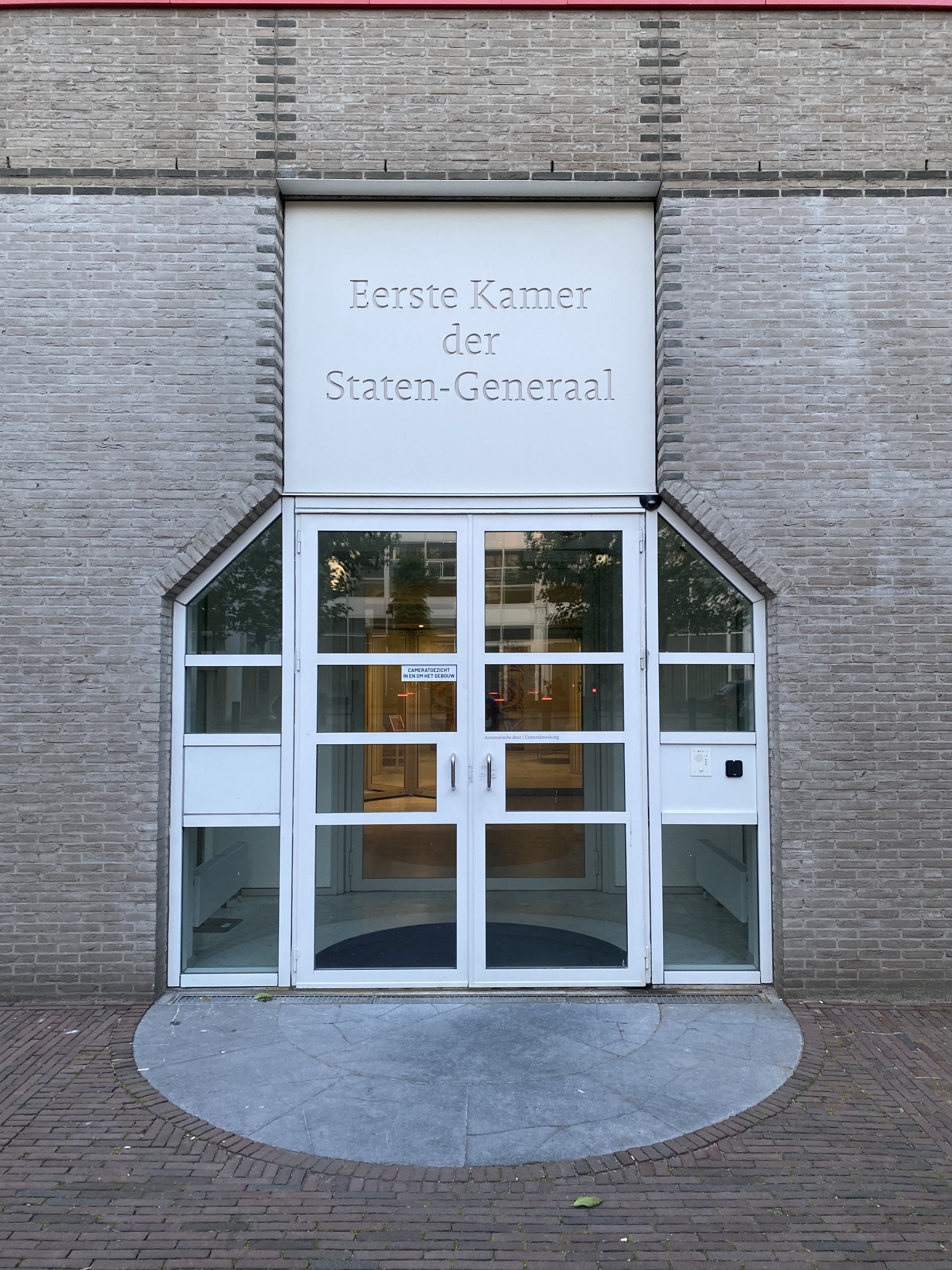
- Kazernestraat 52 (temporary)

Website
- www.eerstekamer.nl

The Senate (Dutch: Eerste Kamer der Staten-Generaal [ˈeːrstə ˈkaːmər dɛr ˈstaːtə(ŋ) ɣeːnəˈraːl], literally "First Chamber of the States General", or simply Eerste Kamer [ˈeːrstə ˈkaːmər]; sometimes Senaat [səˈnaːt]) is the upper house of the States General, the legislature of the Netherlands. Its 75 members are elected on lists by the members of the twelve provincial councils and four electoral colleges for the Senate (Note: Three for the Caribbean Netherlands and one for Dutch expatriates.) every four years, within three months of the provincial elections. All provinces and colleges have different electoral weight depending on their population.

Members of the Senate tend to be veteran or part-time politicians at the national level, often having other roles. They receive an allowance which is about a quarter of the salary of the members of the lower house. Unlike the politically more significant House of Representatives, it meets only once a week.

It has the right to accept or reject legislative proposals but not to amend them or to initiate legislation. Directly after a bill has been passed by the House of Representatives, it is sent to the Senate and is submitted to a parliamentary committee. The committee decides whether the bill can be immediately put on the agenda of the full chamber or if there should first be preparatory study of the bill. If a bill is immediately put on the agenda of the full chamber, it is passed as a formality without a debate.

== Name ==
Although this body is called the "Senate" in English, this is not a direct translation of its official Dutch name, the "First Chamber of the States General" or, in short, the "First Chamber". Nevertheless, and in contrast to the Second Chamber, the name Senaat is also used often in the media. "Member of the First Chamber" (Eerste Kamerlid), "member of the Senate" (senaatslid) or "senator" (senator) are used, although the first one is the official and most used term.

== History ==
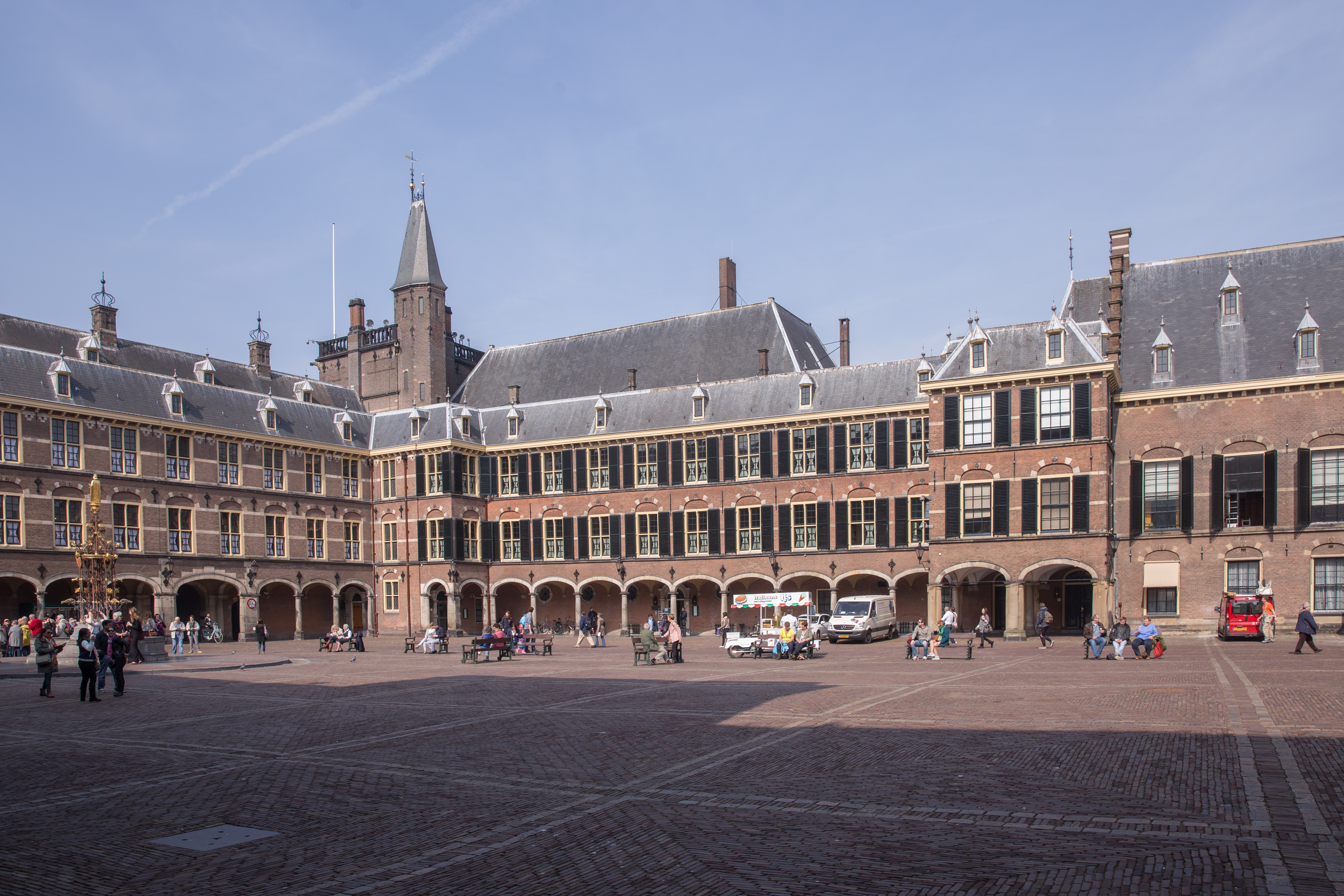
Exterior of the Senate Building from the Binnenhof.

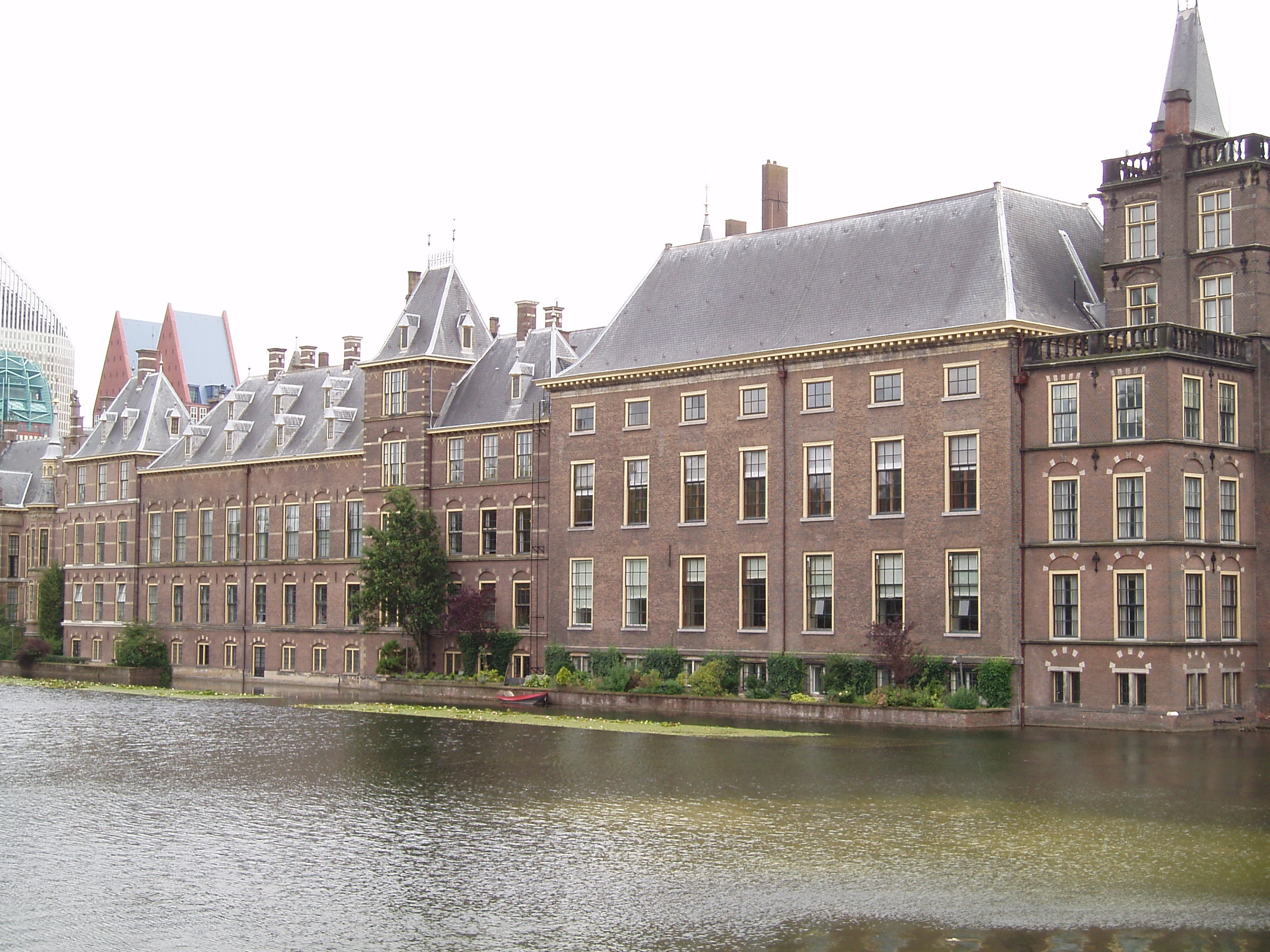
Exterior of the Senate Building from the Hofvijver.

The first constitution of the modern Netherlands, passed in 1814, re-established a unicameral States General. As it became clear that the former Southern Netherlands would be added to the new United Kingdom of the Netherlands, a newly instituted constitutional commission was tasked with drafting a new constitution. The southern members of the constitutional commission pressed for a bicameral system because of the conviction that their nobility should be given a place in the legislature. While the northern members were not enthusiastic about the proposal, they agreed under the condition that nobility would not be a requirement for membership. The new constitution, which came into effect on 24 August 1815, thus provided for a Senate consisting of forty to sixty members appointed by the king for life. The list of the first appointees was published on 16 September 1815 and the newly appointed chamber was first assembled on 21 September 1815 in Brussels in a joint assembly with the House of Representatives. In its early years, the Senate functioned as a bulwark of the Crown (the king and his ministers). Its members, appointed by the king from among the "most significant of the country", were mostly confidants of the king who were often called upon to veto bills that displeased him. Such bills were usually private members' bills from the House of Representatives. The Senate remained in existence after the independence of Belgium in 1830, although its membership was halved to no fewer than twenty and no more than thirty members.

Much changed in the political sphere as a result of the Constitutional Reform of 1848, which introduced direct elections for the House of Representatives, which until then had been elected by provincial councils. The constitutional commission, under the chairmanship of Johan Rudolph Thorbecke, intended for the Senate to be directly elected as well, but the predominantly conservative House of Representatives blocked this, fearing that the two chambers would be too similar. Additionally, senators were expected to judge bills with more independence and distance from daily politics, as a chambre de reflection, which was deemed impossible when they would be forced to campaign for direct election.

It was therefore decided that the Senate would henceforth be elected by provincial councils. Its 39 seats were distributed among the provinces degressively proportional to population, and a third of its members would be elected for 9-year terms every three years using a majoritarian system. The position of the Senate and the criteria governing eligibility to stand for election were also among the changes. Monitoring the quality of legislation gradually came to be the main function of the Senate after 1848.

The existence and functioning of the Senate have been criticised throughout history, manifested in reports of state commissions, government proposals and private member's bills calling for reform or abolition of the Senate. Abolition of the Senate was attempted by social democrats and progressive liberals in 1903, and again after World War I, but these proposals could not count on sufficient support.

However, reform came in 1922, five years after a constitutional amendment that introduced universal male suffrage and proportional representation to the House of Representatives. The constitutional amendment of 1922 brought proportional representation to the Senate as well. Rather than the seats being distributed among the provinces, the provinces were now organised into four groups of roughly equal population, each electing twelve or thirteen senators under party-list proportional representation. The term of senators was decreased to six years, with two of the four groups electing their senators every three years. The number of senators was increased from 50 to 75 in 1956, and the distribution of seats among groups of provinces was adapted to account for changes in population distribution.

The Senate was subjected to another reform in 1983. The term of senators was further reduced to four years, equal to that of Representatives. The system of groups of provinces and staggered elections was abolished in favour of quadrennial elections for the entire Senate in one nationwide constituency. The state commission which had paved the way for the constitutional reform had also recommended direct elections for the Senate, but the House of Representatives adopted a motion rejecting this proposal.

Several minor changes have since been adopted. In 2010, the possibility for party lists to enter into an electoral alliance was abolished, and the number of preference votes needed for a candidate to be elected was increased from 50% to 100% of the quota. The establishment of the three electoral colleges for the Caribbean Netherlands was made possible by the constitutional amendment of 2017. The members of the Caribbean electoral colleges were elected for the first time on 20 March 2019. Citizens of Bonaire, Sint Eustatius and Saba with Dutch nationality are entitled to vote. The establishment of a non-resident electoral college was made possible by the 2022 constitutional amendment.

== Elections and composition ==
=== Eligibility ===
Any Dutch citizen aged 18 years or older who is qualified to vote can stand for election in either house of the States General. However, no one can simultaneously sit as a member in both houses.

=== Electoral system ===
The 75 senators are elected every four years by the members of the provincial councils of the country's twelve provinces and (since 2019) by electoral colleges of the Caribbean Netherlands and Dutch expatriates. The seats are distributed in one nationwide constituency using party-list proportional representation. Remainder seats are distributed using the highest averages method. The weight of a member's vote is determined by the population of the province in which the voter is a member of the provincial council, at a ratio of approximately 1 vote per 100 residents. The table below shows the weight of members' votes per province as of the 2019 election.

Province/Special municipality	Members	Population (Note: Population figures: 1 January 2019)	Votes	Weight per member
South Holland	55	3,674,146	36,740	668
North Holland	55	2,853,488	29,095	519
North Brabant	55	2,544,995	25,465	463
Gelderland	55	2,071,913	20,735	377
Utrecht	49	1,342,194	13,426	274
Overijssel	47	1,156,373	11,562	246
Limburg	47	1,116,127	11,139	237
Friesland	43	647,740	6,493	151
Groningen	43	584,094	5,848	136
Drenthe	41	492,179	4,920	120
Flevoland	41	416,431	4,182	102
Zeeland	39	383,073	3,822	98
Bonaire	9	20,104	198	22
Sint Eustatius	5	3,138	30	6
Saba	5	1,915	20	4

== Parliamentary groups ==
Group	Leader	Seats
Progressief Nederland	Paul Rosenmöller	14 / 75
Farmer–Citizen Movement	Ilona Lagas	11 / 75
People's Party for Freedom and Democracy	Tanja Klip-Martin	9 / 75
Christian Democratic Appeal	Theo Bovens	6 / 75
Democrats 66	Paul van Meenen	7 / 75
Party for Freedom	Alexander van Hattem	4 / 75
Party for the Animals	Ingrid Visseren-Hamakers	1 / 75
JA21	Karin van Bijsterveld	2 / 75
Socialist Party	Rik Janssen	3 / 75
Christian Union	Tineke Huizinga	3 / 75
Forum for Democracy	Johan Dessing	3 / 75
Volt Netherlands	Gaby Perin-Gopie	2 / 75
Reformed Political Party	Peter Schalk	2 / 75
50PLUS	Martin van Rooijen	1 / 75
Independent Politics Netherlands	Auke van der Goot	1 / 75
Independents	-	6 / 75

== College of President and Vice-Presidents ==
The College of President and Vice-Presidents is responsible for the day-to-day administration of the Senate. It consists of the president of the Senate and two vice-presidents.

Position	Portrait	Name	Group
President since 7 October 2025	Mei Li Vos	Mei Li Vos (born 1970)	Pro
First Vice-President since 14 October 2025	Boris Dittrich	Boris Dittrich (born 1955)	D66
Second Vice-President since 14 October 2025	Hendrik-Jan Talsma	Hendrik-Jan Talsma (born 1978)	CU

== See also ==
- List of presidents of the Senate (Netherlands)
- Historic composition of the Senate of the Netherlands
