= List of candidates in the 2019 Dutch Senate election =

For the 2019 Dutch Senate election, 15 electoral lists were successfully submitted, totalling 259 candidates.

The 75 seats were awarded to party lists, with candidates over the preference threshold awarded a seat first if available and the other seats awarded based on position on the list. The preference threshold for this election was 2,309 weighted votes (same as the electoral threshold). Four candidate would have not been elected based on position on the list, but received enough preference votes: Ilse Bezaan (Party for Freedom), Hugo Berkhout, Otto Hermans and Theo Hiddema (all three Forum for Democracy). Replacements are also asked based on position on the list.

== 1: People's Party for Freedom and Democracy ==
Candidate list for People's Party for Freedom and Democracy
Position	Candidate	Votes	Weighted votes	Result
1	Annemarie Jorritsma-Lebbink	78	26,157	Elected
2	Jan Anthonie Bruijn	0	0	Elected
3	Tanja Klip-Martin	0	0	Elected
4	Pim van Ballekom	0	0	Elected
5	Reina de Bruijn-Wezeman	0	0	Elected
6	Micky Adriaansens	0	0	Elected
7	Paulien Geerdink	0	0	Elected
8	Henk Jan Meijer	0	0	Elected
9	Mirjam de Blécourt-Wouterse	0	0	Elected
10	Roel Wever	0	0	Elected
11	Eric van der Burg	0	0	Elected
12	Alfred Arbouw	0	0	Elected
13	Avine Fokkens-Kelder	0	0	
14	Jan Keunen	0	0	Replacement
15	Lucas Vos	0	0	Replacement
16	Caspar van den Berg	0	0	Replacement
17	David Ikkersheim	0	0	
18	René Meeuwissen	0	0	
19	Rian Vogels	0	0	
20	Marjolein van der Linden	0	0	
21	Huub Dekkers	0	0	
22	Roelof Salomons	0	0	
23	Kees Bierens	0	0	
24	Marc Muntinga	0	0	
25	Michiel Hijmans	0	0	
26	Conny Bieze-van Eck	0	0	
27	Gerrit Jan Kok	0	0	
28	Frits Barneveld Binkhuysen	0	0	
29	Bram Cool	0	0	
30	Hans Koning	0	0	
31	Jeroen Pliester	0	0	
32	Ton Serlie	0	0	
33	Oscar van Lent	0	0	
34	Pieter van Woensel	0	0	
35	Wil Vennix	0	0	
36	René Siccama Hiemstra	0	0	
37	Joanneke van Benthem-den Bakker	0	0	
38	Irene van Hooff	0	0	
39	Joël Scherrenberg	0	0	
40	Elly van der Wilk-van Baren	0	0	
41	Hans de Hoog	0	0	
Total		78	26,157	

== 2: Christian Democratic Appeal ==
Candidate list for Christian Democratic Appeal
Position	Candidate	Votes	Weighted votes	Result
1	Ben Knapen	64	16,763	Elected
2	Joop Atsma	1	151	Elected
3	Greet Prins	0	0	Elected
4	Ria Oomen-Ruijten	7	1,659	Elected
5	Theo Rietkerk	1	246	Elected
6	Ton Rombouts	0	0	Elected
7	Niek Jan van Kesteren	0	0	Elected
8	Peter Essers	1	463	Elected
9	Hugo Doornhof	0	0	Elected
10	Jonathan Soeharno	0	0	Replacement
11	Marianne Luyer	0	0	
12	Josine Westerbeek-Huitink	0	0	
13	Mirjam van 't Veld	0	0	
14	Geerten Boogaard	0	0	
15	Frank van den Heuvel	2	474	
16	Hansko Broeksteeg	0	0	
17	Jacqueline van Leeuwen	0	0	
18	Max Keulaerds	0	0	
19	Arjan Kaaks	0	0	
20	Janneke Schermers	0	0	
21	Hester Maij	0	0	
22	Edwin Visser	0	0	
23	Susanne de Roy van Zuidewijn-Rive	0	0	
24	Erik de Ridder	0	0	
Total		76	19,756	

== 3: Democrats 66 ==
Candidate list for Democrats 66
Position	Candidate	Votes	Weighted votes	Result
1	Annelien Bredenoord	40	14,129	Elected
2	Joris Backer	0	0	Elected
3	Alexandra van Huffelen	0	0	Elected
4	Petra Stienen	0	0	Elected
5	Boris Dittrich	3	66	Elected
6	Henk Pijlman	5	648	Elected
7	Paul Schnabel	0	0	Elected, but declined
8	Carla Moonen	0	0	Replacement
9	Peter van der Voort	2	302	Replacement
10	Carinne Elion-Valter	0	0	
11	Ed Kronenburg	0	0	
12	Bas Werker	0	0	
13	Mark Sanders	0	0	
14	Anne Meuwese	0	0	
15	John Bolte	0	0	
16	Willemijn Aerdts	0	0	
17	Aart Karssen	0	0	
18	Paul Breitbarth	0	0	
19	Boris Kocken	0	0	
20	Jan Engels	0	0	
21	Jan-Koen Sluijs	0	0	
22	Agaath Dekker-Groen	0	0	
23	Anneke Wijbenga	0	0	
24	Jeroen Hageman	0	0	
Total		50	15,145	

== 4: Party for Freedom ==
Candidate list for the Party for Freedom
Number	Candidate	Votes	Weighted votes	Result
1	Marjolein Faber	22	5,809	Elected
2	Gom van Strien	0	0	Elected
3	Alexander van Hattem	1	237	Elected
4	Ton van Kesteren	2	272	Elected
5	Max Aardema	4	555	
6	Peter van Dijk	1	98	
7	Ilse Bezaan	7	4,229	Elected
8	Erik Veltmeijer	1	98	
9	Chris Jansen	0	0	
10	Nico Uppelschoten	0	0	
11	Sebastiaan Stöteler	0	0	
12	Elmar Vlottes	0	0	
13	Patricia van der Kammen	0	0	
14	Cees Riezebos	0	0	
15	Marco Deen	0	0	
Total		38	11,298	

== 5: Socialist Party ==
Candidate list for Socialist Party
Position	Candidate	Votes	Weighted votes	Result
1	Tiny Kox			Elected
2	Rik Janssen			Elected
3	Arda Gerkens			Elected
4	Bastiaan van Apeldoorn			Elected
5	Paul Ulenbelt			
6	Cobie Groenendijk			
7	Nicole van Gemert			
8	Meta Meijer			
9	Ruud Kuin			
10	Lies van Aelst			
11	Nurettin Altundal			
12	Theo Coşkun			
13	Rosita van Gijlswijk			
14	Nico Heijmans			
15	Inez Staarink			
16	Bob Ruers			
17	Spencer Zeegers			
18	Hans van Heijningen			
19	Riet de Wit-Romans			
20	Remi Poppe			
Total				

== 6: Labour Party ==
Candidate list for Labour Party
Position	Candidate	Votes	Weighted votes	Result
1	Mei Li Vos	38	11,859	Elected
2	Esther-Mirjam Sent	1	274	Elected
3	Ferd Crone	6	891	Elected
4	Jopie Nooren	5	754	Elected
5	Ruud Koole	1	151	Elected
6	Jeroen Recourt	3	66	Elected
7	Hamit Karakus	0	0	Replacement
8	Mary Fiers	1	463	Replacement
9	Marnix Norder	0	0	
10	Wouter van Zandbrink	0	0	
11	Mies Westerveld	0	0	
12	Artie Ramsodit	0	0	
13	Lambert Verheijen	1	463	
14	Birgit Op de Laak	0	0	
15	André Knottnerus	0	0	
16	Michael Yap	0	0	
17	Jan Lunsing	0	0	
18	Jaouad Khamkhami	0	0	
19	Guusje ter Horst	0	0	
Total		56	14,921	

== 7: GroenLinks ==
Candidate list for GroenLinks
Position	Candidate	Votes	Weighted votes	Result
1	Paul Rosenmöller	41	14,070	Elected
2	Farah Karimi	10	2,872	Elected
3	Margreet de Boer	3	619	Elected
4	Kees Vendrik	2	253	Elected
5	Ruard Ganzevoort	3	48	Elected
6	Saskia Kluit	3	888	Elected
7	Roel van Gurp	0	0	Elected
8	Gala Veldhoen	2	376	Elected
9	Mirjam Krijnen	0	0	Replacement
10	Jan van de Venis	0	0	
11	Alwin Hietbrink	0	0	
12	Funs Elbersen	1	237	
13	Caroline van Dullemen	0	0	
14	Selçuk Akinci	0	0	
15	Axel Boomgaars	0	0	
16	Laura Henderson	0	0	
17	Patricia Withagen	0	0	
18	Rosan Kocken	0	0	
19	János Betkó	0	0	
Total		65	19,363	

== 8: ChristianUnion ==
Candidate list for ChristianUnion
Position	Candidate	Votes	Weighted votes	Result
1	Mirjam Bikker	31	7,903	Elected
2	Peter Ester	1	668	Elected
3	Tineke Huizinga-Heringa	1	136	Elected
4	Maarten Verkerk	0	0	Elected
5	Hendrik-Jan Talsma	0	0	Replacement
6	Simone Kennedy-Doornbos	0	0	Replacement
7	Onno van Schayck	0	0	
8	Gerdien Rots	0	0	
9	Martijn van Meppelen Scheppink	0	0	
10	Trineke Palm	0	0	
11	Bernard Veldkamp	0	0	
12	Jouke de Jong	0	0	
13	Ben Vreugdenhil	0	0	
14	Leendert Verheij	0	0	
15	Cees Dekker	0	0	
16	Hans van Vliet	0	0	
17	Herman Sietsma	0	0	
18	Beatrice de Graaf	0	0	
Total		33	8,707	

== 9: Party for the Animals ==
Candidate list for Party for the Animals
Position	Candidate	Votes	Weighted votes	Result
1	Niko Koffeman			Elected
2	Christine Teunissen			Elected
3	Peter Nicolaï			Elected
4	Henriëtte Prast			Replacement
5	Hiltje Keller			
6	Pim Martens			
7	Floriske van Leeuwen			
8	Luuk van der Veer			
9	Stephanie van Voorthuizen			
10	Joyce van Heijningen			
11	Maarten Reesink			
12	Erno Eskens			
13	Eva Meijer			
14	Marnix van der Werf			
15	Ewald Engelen			
Total				

== 10: Reformed Political Party ==
Candidate list for Reformed Political Party
Position	Candidate	Votes	Weighted votes	Result
1	Peter Schalk	10	3,724	Elected
2	Diederik van Dijk	0	0	Elected
3	Servaas Stoop	0	0	
4	Gert van Leeuwen	0	0	
5	Hans Tanis	0	0	
6	Breunis van de Weerd	1	377	
7	Gerard van der Waal	0	0	
8	Rien Hoek	0	0	
9	Harry van der Maas	4	392	
10	Arnold Weggeman	0	0	
11	Ewart Bosma	0	0	
12	Theo Meijboom	0	0	
13	David van As	0	0	
14	Wim de Vries	0	0	
15	Jos Bart	0	0	
16	Sjaak Simonse	0	0	
17	Peter Zevenbergen	0	0	
18	Aart de Kruijf	0	0	
19	Ad Dorst	0	0	
20	Wouter Boonzaaijer	0	0	
Total		15	4,493	

== 11: 50Plus ==
Candidate list for 50Plus
Position	Candidate	Votes	Weighted votes	Result
1	Martin van Rooijen			Elected
2	Martine Baay			Elected
3	Rob de Brouwer			
4	Erik Meijboom			
5	Erik Lutjens			
6	Janbart Evenboer			
7	Theun Wiersma			
8	Chris Nyqvist			
9	Hylke ten Cate			
10	Henk van Elst			
11	Marcel Bruins			
12	Anne Marie Fischer-Otten			
13	Willem Willemse			
14	Karel Scheps			
Total				

== 12: Independent Senate Group ==
Candidate list for Independent Senate Group
Position	Candidate	Votes	Weighted votes	Result
1	Gerben Gerbrandy	11	1,565	Elected
2	Ton Raven	1	237	Replacement
3	John van Gorp	1	463	
4	Henk Jan Schmaal	0	0	
5	Roy Luca	0	0	
Total		13	2,265	

== 13: Forum for Democracy ==
Candidate list for the Forum for Democracy
Number	Candidate	Votes	Weighted votes	Result
1	Henk Otten	4	1,186	Elected
2	Paul Cliteur	52	11,888	Elected
3	Annabel Nanninga	0	0	Elected
4	Paul Frentrop	0	0	Elected
5	Jeroen de Vries	2	548	Elected
6	Dorien Rookmaker	0	0	Elected
7	Rob Rooken	0	0	Elected, but declined
8	Lennart van der Linden	0	0	Elected
9	Loek van Wely	0	0	Elected
10	Johan Dessing	0	0	Replacement
11	Toine Beukering	0	0	Replacement
12	Nicki Pouw-Verweij	0	0	Replacement
13	Rob Roos	0	0	
14	Bob van Pareren	0	0	Replacement
15	Robert Baljeu	0	0	Replacement
16	Hugo Berkhout	8	4,152	Elected
17	Sytze van Odijk	0	0	
18	Otto Hermans	11	3,019	Elected (Note: Declined at first, but joined later.)
19	Theo Hiddema	10	6,680	Elected
Total		87	27,473	

== 14: DENK ==
Candidate list for DENK
Position	Candidate	Votes	Weighted votes	Result
1	Selçuk Öztürk	4	1,563	
2	Natasha Mohamed-Hoesein	0	0	
3	Dursun Kiliç	0	0	
4	Toon Peters	0	0	
5	Ditter Blom	0	0	
Total		4	1,563	

== 15: List Frans ==
Candidate list for List Frans
Position	Candidate	Votes	Weighted votes	Result
1	J.C. Frans	0	0	
Total		0	0	

== See also ==
- List of members of the Senate of the Netherlands, 2019–2023
