= List of members of the Senate of the Netherlands, 2019–2023 =

Senate of the Netherlands, 2019–2023
←	2015–2019	2023–2027	→

Overview
- Legislative body: Senate
- Term: 11 June 2019 – 6 June 2023
- Election: 2019 Senate election
- Members: 75
- President: Jan Anthonie Bruijn

Between 11 June 2019 and 6 June 2023, 91 individuals served as representatives in Senate, the 75-seat upper house of the States-General of the Netherlands. 75 members were elected in the 27 May 2019 Senate election, and 16 members were appointed as replacements as elected representatives resigned or went on leave. Jan Anthonie Bruijn was elected President of the Senate on 2 July 2019.

During this period, the third Rutte cabinet and fourth Rutte cabinet reigned. Both coalitions were made up People's Party for Freedom and Democracy (VVD, 12 seats), Christian Democratic Appeal (CDA, 9 seats), Democrats 66 (D66, 7 seats) and Christian Union (CU, 4 seats). Totalling 32 seats, the coalition never had a majority in the Senate during this period. The opposition consisted – at the start – of Forum for Democracy (FvD, 12 seats), GroenLinks (GL, 8 seats), Labour Party (PvdA, 6 seats), Party for Freedom (PVV, 5 seats), Socialist Party (SP, 4 seats), Party for the Animals (PvdD, 3 seats), 50PLUS (50+, 2 seats), Reformed Political Party (SGP, 3 seats) and Independent Politics Netherlands (OSF, 1 seat).

Resignations generally do not affect the balance of power, as replacements are appointed from the party list. However, during the term three new parliamentary groups were created, all split off from FvD. In July–August 2019, Henk Otten, Jeroen de Vries and Dorien Rookmaker left to form the Fractie-Otten. In February 2020, Rookmaker left and was replaced by Otto Hermans who joined the FvD group again. In November–December 2020, another 8 members left FvD, to form the Fractie-Van Pareren, which was later renamed Fractie-Nanninga. When Nicki Pouw-Verweij (member of the Fractie-Nanninga) left the Senate, she was replaced by Theo Hiddema who joined the FvD group. Finally, in March 2022, Paul Frentrop and Theo Hiddema left FvD to form the Fractie-Frentrop. This left FvD at the end of the term with only one seat.

== Members ==
Name	Party	Assumed office	Term end	Ref.
Micky Adriaansens	VVD	11 June 2019	9 January 2022 (Note: Left to join the cabinet)	
Alfred Arbouw	VVD	11 June 2019	12 June 2023	
Bastiaan van Apeldoorn	SP	11 June 2019	12 June 2023	
Joop Atsma	CDA	11 June 2019	12 June 2023	
Martine Baay-Timmerman	50+	11 June 2019	12 June 2023	
Joris Backer	D66	11 June 2019	12 June 2023	
Robert Baljeu	Fractie-Otten	15 December 2020	14 February 2021	
Pim van Ballekom	VVD	11 June 2019	12 June 2023	
Caspar van den Berg	VVD	18 January 2022	12 June 2023	
Hugo Berkhout	FvD (Note: Until 28 November 2020)	26 October 2020	12 June 2023	
Hugo Berkhout	Fractie-Van Pareren (Note: Between 29 November 2020 and 14 February 2021)	26 October 2020	12 June 2023	
Hugo Berkhout	Fractie-Nanninga (Note: Since 15 February 2021)	26 October 2020	12 June 2023	
Toine Beukering	FvD	11 June 2019	12 June 2023	
Toine Beukering	Fractie-Van Pareren	11 June 2019	12 June 2023	
Toine Beukering	Fractie-Nanninga	11 June 2019	12 June 2023	
Ilse Bezaan	PVV	11 June 2019	12 June 2023	
Mirjam Bikker	CU	11 June 2019	30 March 2021 (Note: Left to join the House of Representatives)	
Mirjam de Blécourt	VVD	11 June 2019	12 June 2023	
Margreet de Boer	GL	11 June 2019	12 June 2023	
Annelien Bredenoord	D66	11 June 2019	12 June 2023	
Jan Anthonie Bruijn	VVD	11 June 2019	12 June 2023	
Reina de Bruijn-Wezeman	VVD	11 June 2019	12 June 2023	
Eric van der Burg	VVD	11 June 2019	9 January 2022	
Paul Cliteur	FvD	11 June 2019	25 November 2020	
Ferd Crone	PvdA	11 June 2019	12 June 2023	
Johan Dessing	FvD	11 June 2019	12 June 2023	
Diederik van Dijk	SGP	11 June 2019	12 June 2023	
Boris Dittrich	D66	11 June 2019	12 June 2023	
Hugo Doornhof	CDA	11 June 2019	12 June 2023	
Peter Essers	CDA	11 June 2019	12 June 2023	
Peter Ester	CU	11 June 2019	11 December 2022 (Note: Died in office)	
Marjolein Faber	PVV	11 June 2019	12 June 2023	
Mary Fiers	PvdA	12 October 2021	12 June 2023	
Paul Frentrop	FvD (Note: Until 30 March 2022)	11 June 2019	12 June 2023	
Paul Frentrop	Fractie-Frentrop (Note: Starting 31 March 2022)	11 June 2019	12 June 2023	
Ruard Ganzevoort	GL	11 June 2019	12 June 2023	
Paulien Geerdink	VVD	11 June 2019	12 June 2023	
Gerben Gerbrandy	OSF	11 June 2019	15 January 2021 (Note: Left because of health issues)	
Arda Gerkens	SP	11 June 2019	12 June 2023	
Roel van Gurp	GL	11 June 2019	12 June 2023	
Alexander van Hattem	PVV	11 June 2019	12 June 2023	
Otto Hermans	FvD	10 September 2019	12 November 2019	
Otto Hermans	FvD	18 February 2020	12 June 2023	
Otto Hermans	Fractie-Van Pareren (Note: Between 28 November 2020 and 14 February 2021)	18 February 2020	12 June 2023	
Otto Hermans	Fractie-Nanninga	18 February 2020	12 June 2023	
Theo Hiddema	FvD	13 April 2021	12 June 2023	
Theo Hiddema	Fractie-Frentrop	13 April 2021	12 June 2023	
Alexandra van Huffelen	D66	11 June 2019	29 January 2021	
Tineke Huizinga-Heringa	CU	11 June 2019	12 June 2023	
Rik Janssen	SP	11 June 2019	12 June 2023	
Annemarie Jorritsma-Lebbink	VVD	11 June 2019	12 June 2023	
Hamit Karakus	PvdA	2 March 2021	12 June 2023	
Farah Karimi	GL	11 June 2019	12 June 2023	
Simone Kennedy-Doornbos	CU	17 January 2023	12 June 2023	
Niek Jan van Kesteren	CDA	11 June 2019	12 June 2023	
Ton van Kesteren	PVV	11 June 2019	12 June 2023	
Jan Keunen	VVD	26 October 2020	12 June 2023	
Tanja Klip-Martin	VVD	11 June 2019	12 June 2023	
Saskia Kluit	GL	11 June 2019	12 June 2023	
Ben Knapen	CDA	11 June 2019	24 September 2021 (Note: Left to temporarily join the caretaker cabinet)	
Ben Knapen	CDA	8 February 2022	12 June 2023	
Niko Koffeman	PvdD	11 June 2019	12 June 2023	
Ruud Koole	PvdA	11 June 2019	12 June 2023	
Tiny Kox	SP	11 June 2019	12 June 2023	
Mirjam Krijnen	GL	27 September 2022	12 June 2023	
Lennart van der Linden	FvD	11 June 2019	12 June 2023	
Lennart van der Linden	Fractie-Van Pareren	11 June 2019	12 June 2023	
Lennart van der Linden	Fractie-Nanninga	11 June 2019	12 June 2023	
Henk Jan Meijer	VVD	11 June 2019	12 June 2023	
Carla Moonen	D66	11 June 2019	12 June 2023	
Annabel Nanninga	FvD	11 June 2019	29 October 2020 (Note: Went on parental leave)	
Annabel Nanninga	Fractie-Nanninga	15 February 2021	12 June 2023	
Peter Nicolaï	PvdD	11 June 2019	12 June 2023	
Jopie Nooren	PvdA	11 June 2019	1 March 2021 (Note: Left to become chair of the Hogeschool van Amsterdam)	
Ria Oomen-Ruijten	CDA	11 June 2019	12 June 2023	
Henk Otten	FvD (Note: Until 27 July 2019)	11 June 2019	12 June 2023	
Henk Otten	Fractie-Otten (Note: Since 28 July 2019)	11 June 2019	12 June 2023	
Bob van Pareren	FvD	11 June 2019	12 June 2023	
Bob van Pareren	Fractie-Van Pareren	11 June 2019	12 June 2023	
Bob van Pareren	Fractie-Nanninga	11 June 2019	12 June 2023	
Henk Pijlman	D66	11 June 2019	12 June 2023	
Nicki Pouw-Verweij	FvD	11 June 2019	23 July 2019	
Nicki Pouw-Verweij	FvD	13 November 2019	30 March 2021	
Nicki Pouw-Verweij	Fractie-Van Pareren	13 November 2019	30 March 2021	
Nicki Pouw-Verweij	Fractie-Nanninga (Note: Since 15 February 2021)	13 November 2019	30 March 2021	
Henriëtte Prast	PvdD	6 April 2021	12 June 2023	
Greet Prins	CDA	11 June 2019	12 June 2023	
Ton Raven	OSF	19 January 2021	12 June 2023	
Jeroen Recourt	PvdA	11 June 2019	12 June 2023	
Theo Rietkerk	CDA	11 June 2019	12 June 2023	
Ton Rombouts	CDA	11 June 2019	12 June 2023	
Dorien Rookmaker	FvD (Note: Until 19 August 2019)	11 June 2019	9 February 2020	
Dorien Rookmaker	Fractie-Otten (Note: Since 20 August 2019)	11 June 2019	9 February 2020	
Martin van Rooijen	50+	11 June 2019	12 June 2023	
Paul Rosenmöller	GL	11 June 2019	12 June 2023	
Peter Schalk	SGP	11 June 2019	12 June 2023	
Esther-Mirjam Sent	PvdA	11 June 2019	7 October 2021 (Note: Left to become chair of the Labour Party)	
Jonathan Soeharno	CDA	24 September 2021	2 February 2022 (Note: Left so Ben Knapen could return to the Senate)	
Petra Stienen	D66	11 June 2019	12 June 2023	
Gom van Strien	PVV	11 June 2019	12 June 2023	
Hendrik-Jan Talsma	CU	6 April 2021	12 June 2023	
Christine Teunissen	PvdD	11 June 2019	30 March 2021	
Gala Veldhoen	GL	11 June 2019	12 June 2023	
Kees Vendrik	GL	11 June 2019	27 September 2022 (Note: Left to become chair of the platform for social dialogue and reflection on climate policy)	
Maarten Verkerk	CU	11 June 2019	12 June 2023	
Peter van der Voort	D66	4 February 2020	12 June 2023	
Lucas Vos	VVD	18 January 2022	12 June 2023	
Mei Li Vos	PvdA	11 June 2019	12 June 2023	
Jeroen de Vries	FvD	11 June 2019	12 June 2023	
Jeroen de Vries	Fractie-Otten	11 June 2019	12 June 2023	
Loek van Wely	FvD (Note: Until 7 December 2020)	11 June 2019	12 June 2023	
Loek van Wely	Fractie-Van Pareren (Note: Between 8 December 2020 and 14 February 2021)	11 June 2019	12 June 2023	
Loek van Wely	Fractie-Nanninga	11 June 2019	12 June 2023	
Roel Wever	VVD	11 June 2019	16 October 2020	

== See also ==
- List of candidates in the 2019 Dutch Senate election
