= List of members of the Senate of the Netherlands for GroenLinks =

This is a list of all members of the Senate for GroenLinks.

== List ==
Name	Begin date	End date	Ref.
Harmen Binnema	2 October 2018	10 June 2019	
Margreet de Boer	7 June 2011	9 June 2015	
Margreet de Boer	11 June 2019	12 June 2023	
Wim de Boer	5 February 1991	9 June 2003	
Britta Böhler	12 June 2007	6 June 2011	
Fenna Bolding	13 February 1990 (Note: Was previously member of the Senate for the CPN.)	12 June 1995	
Bas de Gaay Fortman	13 February 1990 (Note: Was previously member of the Senate for the PPR.)	31 January 1991	
Ruard Ganzevoort	7 June 2011	12 June 2023	
Roel van Gurp	11 June 2019	12 June 2023 (Note: Continued as member of the Senate for GroenLinks-PvdA.)	
Farah Karimi	11 June 2019	12 June 2023	
Saskia Kluit	11 June 2019	12 June 2023	
Mirjam Krijnen	27 September 2022	12 June 2023	
Jos van der Lans	8 June 1999	12 June 2007	
Jan Laurier	12 June 2007	6 June 2011	
Frits Lintmeijer	9 June 2015	10 June 2019	
Goos Minderman	31 October 2006	12 June 2007	
Tom Pitstra	11 June 1991	11 June 2001	
Leo Platvoet	8 June 1999	12 June 2007	
Sam Pormes	19 June 2001	30 October 2006	
Mirjam de Rijk	10 June 2003	11 October 2004	
Paul Rosenmöller	11 June 2019	12 June 2023	
Bob van Schijndel	8 June 1999	9 June 2003	
Coby Schoondergang-Horikx	13 June 1995	9 June 2003	
Tineke Strik	12 June 2007	10 June 2019	
Tof Thissen	12 October 2004	9 June 2015	
Gala Veldhoen	11 June 2019	12 June 2023	
Kees Vendrik	11 June 2019	20 September 2022	
Joop Vogt	13 February 1990 (Note: Was previously member of the Senate for the PSP)	10 June 1991	
Marijke Vos	7 June 2011	25 September 2018	
Hannah van Wijngaarden	11 June 1991	12 June 1995	
Diana de Wolff	8 June 1999	11 June 2007	
Ans Zwerver	13 June 1995	9 June 2003	
