= Geerdink =

Geerdink is a Dutch surname. Notable people with thecsurname include:

- Fréderike Geerdink (born 1970), Dutch journalist and author
- Paulien Geerdink (born 1969), Dutch politician
