= List of members of the Senate of the Netherlands for Party for the Animals =

This is a list of all members of the Senate of the Netherlands for Party for the Animals.

In November 2025, the three-man parliamentary group split. Niko Koffeman had resigned from the party, but wanted to remain in the parliamentary group. After Peter Nicolaï refused to expel Koffeman from the parliamentary group, he was expelled from the party. Ingrid Visseren-Hamakers subsequently left the parliamentary group and continued under the name Fractie-Visseren-Hamakers, while Koffeman and Nicolaï were allowed to continue as the parliamentary group 'Party for the Animals'.

== List ==
Name	Begin date	End date	Ref.
Niko Koffeman	12 June 2007		
Christine Teunissen	9 June 2015	9 October 2018	
Christine Teunissen	12 March 2019	30 March 2021	
Floriske van Leeuwen	16 October 2018	11 March 2019	
Peter Nicolaï	11 June 2019		
Henriëtte Prast	6 April 2021	12 June 2023	
Ingrid Visseren-Hamakers	13 June 2023		
