= Cees van de Sanden =

Dutch attorney and politician (born 1962)

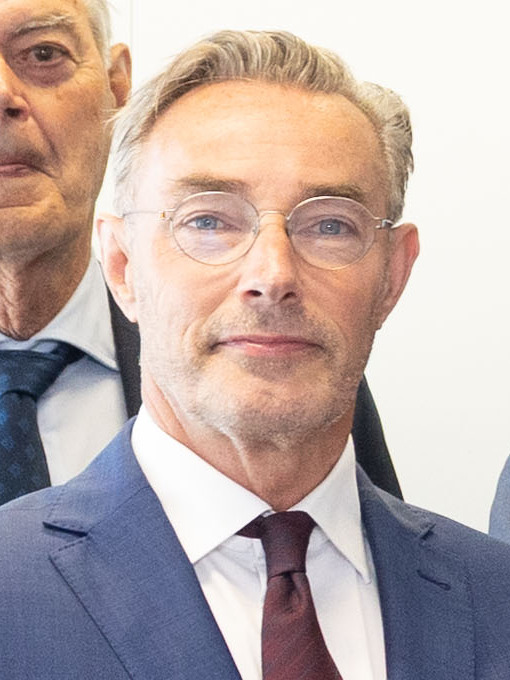
- Van de Sanden in 2025

Member of the Senate
- Incumbent
- Assumed office 24 September 2024
- Preceded by: Caspar van den Berg
- In office 27 June 2023 – 11 October 2023
- Preceded by: Paulien Geerdink
- Succeeded by: Paulien Geerdink

Personal details
- Born: Cornelis Adrianus Hendricus van de Sanden; 11 December 1962 (age 63)
- Party: People's Party for Freedom and Democracy (until 2025)
- Education: Tilburg University (LL.M.)
- Occupation: advisor; politician

Cornelis Adrianus Hendricus "Cees" van de Sanden (Dutch pronunciation: [ˈkeːs fɑn də ˈsɑndə(n)]; born 11 December 1962) is a Dutch former attorney and politician. He has been an independent politician since he left the conservative-liberal People's Party for Freedom and Democracy (VVD) in October 2025.

== Early life ==
Van de Sanden was born on 11 December 1962 and grew up in Tilburg, North Brabant in the district north of its center. In his maiden speech as senator, he told that his father worked in a textile factory, and he described him as socialist and pro-union. Van de Sanden said he had attended the Cobbenhagen College at VWO level.

== Career ==
He worked as an administrative law advisor for a provincial government. He studied Dutch law at Tilburg University between 2001 and 2006, and he was admitted to the bar in January 2007. Van de Sanden completed his three-year Legal Profession Training Course (Beroepsopleiding Advocaat) as an intern at the law firms NautaDutilh and Loyens & Loeff, and he later worked for the firm AKD. He established his own solo practice in 2012 and was joined by criminal defense attorney Heleen Peters in November 2016 to form Van de Sanden & Peters Advocaten, located in Utrecht. Van de Sanden is specialized in administrative law and has worked on cases related to spatial planning, environment, privacy, and law and order, and he has annotated cases for the legal journal Bouwrecht (Construction law). In 2009, after the Spatial Planning Act had been enacted, Van de Sanden and a colleague warned it could put thousands of construction projects on hold. They argued exemptions to zoning plans granted by municipalities would not be valid under the new legislation in case a building permit had not yet been obtained, and they recommended the minister to add a grandfather clause. In a 2015 opinion piece in the NRC Handelsblad, Van de Sanden and Peters criticized an amendment to the Aliens Employment Act that led to the immediate publication of companies fined in violation. They complained companies that were later found to be innocent were not compensated for reputational damage.

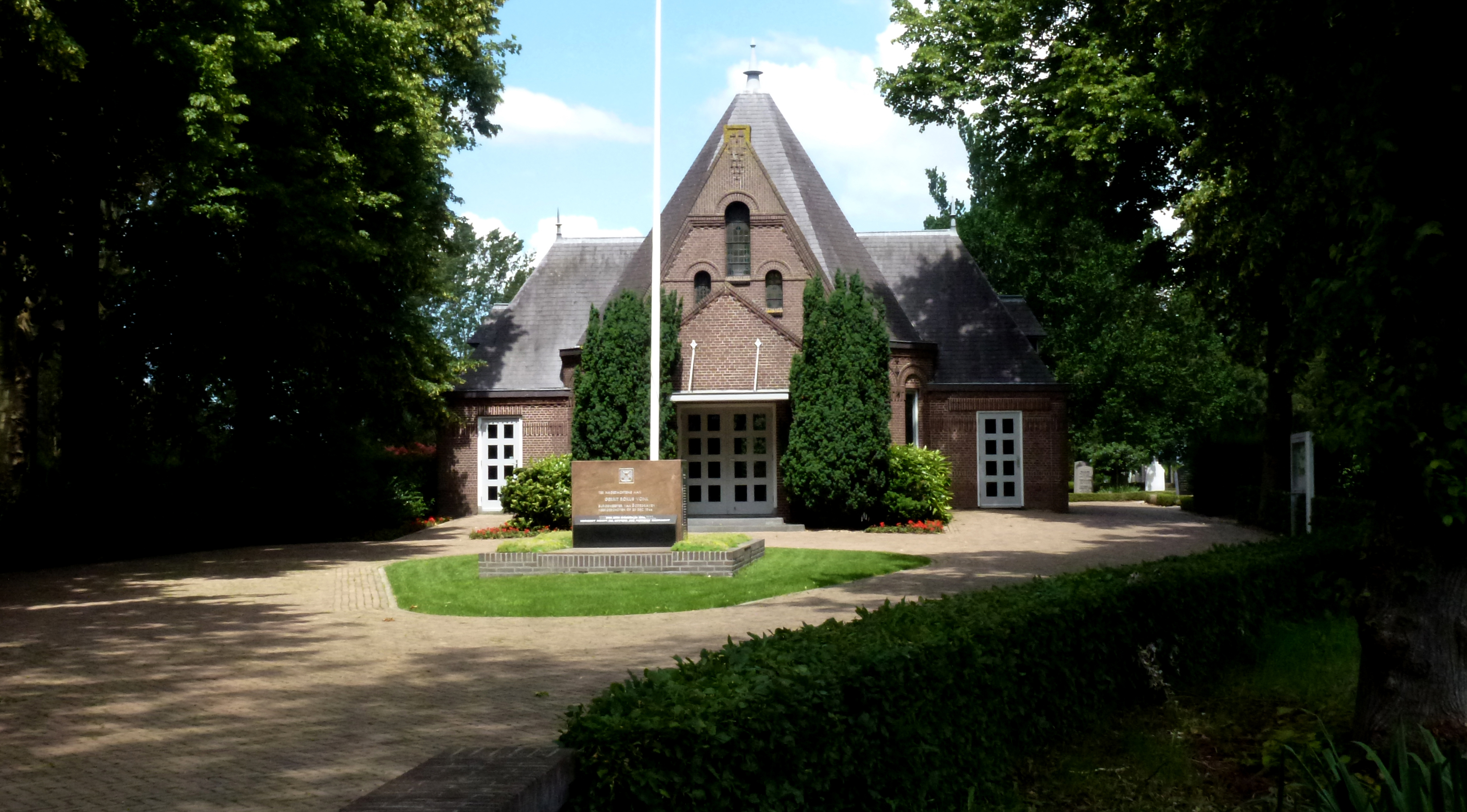
Vredehof cemetery in Bodegraven, which was visited by conspiracy theorists in early 2021

Van de Sanden represented the municipality of Bodegraven-Reeuwijk in several cases that drew national media attention starting in 2021. Allegations of Satanic ritual abuse of children in Bodegraven in the 1980s were spread by three individuals – one claiming to be a survivor – through an online broadcast. As a result, inhabitants received threats and believers flocked to the graves of supposed victims in early 2021 to lay flowers. Mayor Christiaan van der Kamp sought legal advice after relatives had been angered, and Van de Sanden advised to prohibit non-relatives from visiting the affected cemetery through an emergency order. After continued unrest, the municipality started an injunction suit against the three men to stop them from promoting the conspiracy theory, separate from criminal proceedings by the Public Prosecution Service. The District Court of The Hague agreed with the municipality and ordered the defendants in July to take down their posts from social media. Van de Sanden called it a groundbreaking judgement that would allow municipalities to tackle online disturbances through civil action. However, he also called on the Dutch Data Protection Authority to take more action in the future. Wouter Raatgever – one of the conspiracy theorists – was sentenced to six months in prison for threats against Van de Sanden and incitement against a prominent physician-scientist. Raatgever had accused Van de Sanden of protecting a Satanist pedophile network and said that he should receive the death penalty from a military tribunal.

Through a civil case, Bodegraven-Reeuwijk tried to recover security, clean-up, and legal costs incurred as a result of the conspiracy theory. The three conspiracy theorists were ordered to pay €215,000 in May 2022, but the decision was reversed for one of the defendants on appeal the next year. Van de Sanden also continued efforts to have the social media posts removed, as the three men failed to comply with the judgement. Platform Twitter suspended one account after receiving a draft subpoena but did not abide by the municipality's request to remove all tweets promoting the conspiracy theory. In turn, the municipality filed an injunction suit against Twitter. The District Court of The Hague ruled in October 2022 that the company had done enough and that it would be too complex to have it filter all illegal content. Reflecting on his work for the municipality, Van de Sanden wrote in an opinion piece that mayors have more possibilities than often believed to act on online calls to disrupt public order by drawing on civil rather than administrative law. However, Van de Sanden and Peters also expressed that an expanded set of tools would be required for mayors, saying that parts of the relevant legislation stemmed from the 19th century and did therefore not consider the digital world.

Van de Sanden's partnership with Heleen Peters ended when they dissolved their firm in September 2022. He founded the short-lived SandenHartman with financial attorney Jesler Hartman Kok, before becoming founding partner in April 2024 of a firm called Legolas Law. Both had their offices in Eindhoven.

As of February 2, 2026, Van de Sanden is no longer registered on the Roll of Advocates and has ceased practicing as a lawyer. Since that date, he has been active as an advisor.

== Politics ==
Van de Sanden became active for the People's Party for Freedom and Democracy (VVD) in 2021 in his home province of North Brabant, where he helped write its provincial election program. He ran for the Senate in May 2023 as the party's twelfth candidate. The ballot listed 's-Hertogenbosch as his place of residence, and he said he wanted to contribute to a liberal, safe, and enterprising Netherlands. Van de Sanden was not elected to the Senate, as the VVD won ten seats. On 16 June 2023, Senator Paulien Geerdink (VVD) suffered a spinal fracture resulting from a fall and went on sick leave. Van de Sanden was sworn in as her temporary replacement on 27 June due to his place on the party list in the last election. The seat had been declined by the VVD's eleventh candidate, Marjolein van der Linden. Geerdink returned on 12 October 2023, bringing an end to his term. Van de Sanden was sworn in as the permanent replacement of Senator Caspar van den Berg on 24 September 2024. Following the repeated decision of the eleventh-ranked candidate to decline the seat. He left the VVD and continued as an independent politician on 8 October 2025, declaring that the party had "drifted away from its core values of liberty, responsibility, tolerance, social justice, and equality."

In June 2025, Van de Sanden came under scrutiny for acting as legal counsel for the Dutch subsidiary of the Russian oil company Lukoil, while simultaneously voting in the Senate on matters that could affect the company. Integrity experts criticized the lack of transparency and pointed to potential conflicts of interest and security risks, particularly in light of Lukoil’s ties to the Kremlin.

In March 2026, Van de Sanden was appointed, together with Mary Fiers, as rapporteur for the European "Digital AI Omnibus" and "Digital Omnibus" proposals. The rapporteurs were appointed for a period of nine months to support the information position of the Senate (Eerste Kamer of the Netherlands). Following consultations between the Committees on Digitalization and on Economic Affairs, Climate, and Sustainable Growth and the relevant Secretaries of State on 17 March 2026, the Senate (Eerste Kamer of the Netherlands) decided on 24 March 2026 to lift the parliamentary scrutiny reserve for these proposals, ending the Senate's ability to suspend the legislative process in Brussels for these files.

=== Senate committee assignments ===
First term:

- Committee on Education, Culture and Science
- Committee on Economic Affairs and Climate Policy
- Committee on Finances
- Committee on Social Affairs and Employment

Second term:

- Committee on Digitization
- Committee on Economic Affairs / Climate Policy and Green Growth
- Committee on European Affairs
- Committee on the Interior
- Committee on Justice and Security
- Committee on Health, Welfare and Sport

== Electoral history ==
Electoral history of Cees van de Sanden
Year	Body	Party	Pos.	Votes	Result		Ref.
Year	Body	Party	Pos.	Votes	Party seats	Individual	Ref.
2023	Senate	People's Party for Freedom and Democracy	12	0 (Note: To account for population differences between provinces, a weighted vote total of 0 is used.)	10	Lost (Note: Van de Sanden was appointed to the body later during the term due to a vacancy.)	
