= Maarten Goudzwaard =

Dutch politician

Member of the House of Representatives
- Incumbent
- Assumed office 12 November 2025
- In office 10 March 2022 – 30 June 2022
- Preceded by: Nicki Pouw-Verweij
- Succeeded by: Nicki Pouw-Verweij

Member of the Provincial Council of Friesland
- Incumbent
- Assumed office 28 March 2019

Personal details
- Born: 28 August 1979 (age 46) Ferwert, Netherlands
- Party: JA21 (since 2020)
- Other political affiliations: FvD (2019–2020)

Maarten Goudzwaard (born 28 August 1979) is a Dutch politician from JA21, who served as a member of the House of Representatives as a substitute for Nicki Pouw-Verweij in 2022 who was on maternity leave and again from 2025 after being elected in the 2025 Dutch general election. He has also been a member of the Provincial Council of Friesland since 2019.

== Biography ==
Goudzwaard was born in Ferwerd in 1979 to a Frisian speaking family. He worked as a supervisor at a tax hotline and was a team leader in the telecom and insurance sectors, and later a production manager for a loyalty card manufacturer.

In 2019, Goudzwaard was the lead candidate for the Forum for Democracy for the Provincial Council of Friesland during the 2019 Dutch provincial elections. In December 2020 he resigned from the party in protest of the leadership style of Thierry Baudet and joined JA21. He was placed fourth on the JA21 list for the 2021 Dutch general election but was not elected. He subsequently worked as a policy officer for the party. From March 10 to June 30, 2022, Goudzwaard was a member of the House of Representatives in a temporary vacancy because Pouw was on maternity leave. He was elected to the House during the 2025 Dutch general election.

== Electoral history ==
Electoral history of Maarten Goudzwaard
Year	Body	Party	Pos.	Votes	Result		Ref.
Year	Body	Party	Pos.	Votes	Party seats	Individual	Ref.
2021	House of Representatives	JA21	4	1,380	3	Lost (Note: Goudzwaard was appointed to the body later during the term due to a vacancy.)	
2023	House of Representatives	JA21	6	539	1	Lost	
2025	House of Representatives	JA21	8	1,842	9	Won	

== See also ==
- List of members of the House of Representatives of the Netherlands, 2021–2023
