= Marco Deen =

Dutch politician (born 1968)

Member of the House of Representatives
- In office 6 December 2023 – 11 November 2025

Member of the Provincial Council of North Holland
- Incumbent
- Assumed office 2018

Personal details
- Born: 8 June 1968 (age 57) Heerlen, Netherlands
- Party: PVV
- Occupation: Politician

Marco Deen (born 8 June 1968) is a Dutch entrepreneur and politician of the Party for Freedom (PVV). Between December 2023 and November 2025, he was a member of the House of Representatives, and he is a member of the Provincial Council of North Holland, where he serves as the party's regional leader and spokesman.

== Biography ==
Deen was born in Heerlen in 1968 before moving to Zandvoort. He worked for Holland Casino before becoming an entrepreneur and consultant within the entertainment and leisure industry.

He became a municipal councilor for the PVV in Zandvoort in 2015. Since 2018 he has also sat on the Provincial Council of North Holland where he acts as the party's group leader. He also sits on the council's committee for social mobility and finance.

In the 2023 Dutch general election, Deen was elected to the House of Representatives. He served as his party's spokesperson for emancipation until his portfolio changed to the interior. When Femke Halsema, mayor of Amsterdam, allowed a pro-Palestinian protest on the first anniversary of the October 7 attacks, PVV leader Geert Wilders criticized her, after which Deen requested Minister of the Interior and Kingdom Relations Judith Uitermark to dismiss Halsema. Prime Minister Dick Schoof responded that it was unacceptable to request in parliament the firing of a mayor for political reasons. During the same debate, Deen filed an amendment to freeze King Willem-Alexander's income in the 2025 budget. He was not re-elected in October 2025, and his term ended on 11 November.

=== House committee assignments ===
- Committee for the Interior
- Committee for Kingdom Relations
- Committee for Economic Affairs
- Committee for Climate Policy and Green Growth

== Electoral history ==
Electoral history of Marco Deen
Year	Body	Party	Pos.	Votes	Result		Ref.
Year	Body	Party	Pos.	Votes	Party seats	Individual	Ref.
2019	Senate	Party for Freedom	15	0	5	Lost	
2021	House of Representatives	Party for Freedom	29	238	17	Lost	
2023	House of Representatives	Party for Freedom	22	582	37	Won	
2025	House of Representatives	Party for Freedom	28	273	26	Lost	
