= Ingrid Visseren-Hamakers =

Dutch academic and politician (born 1970)

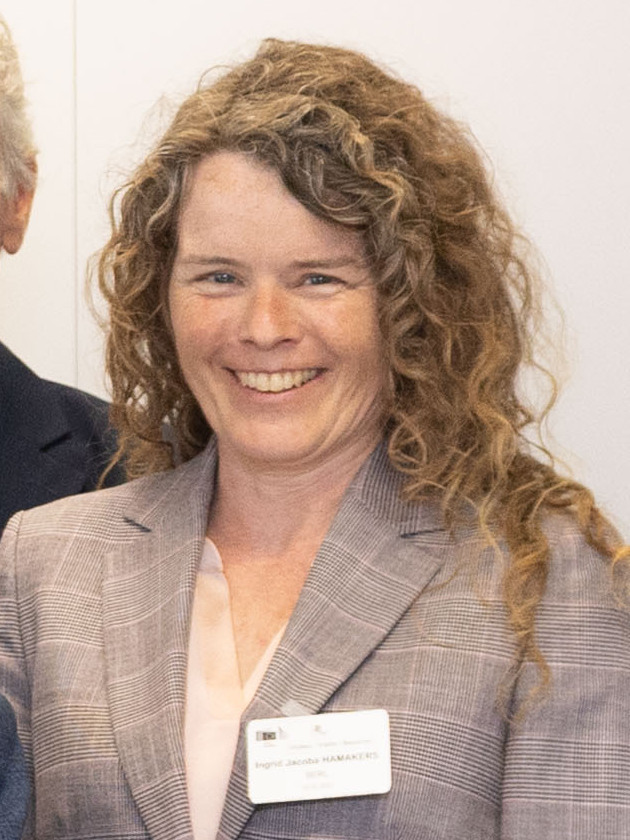
- Visseren-Hamakers in 2025

Member of the Senate
- Incumbent
- Assumed office 13 June 2023

Personal details
- Born: Ingrid Jacoba Hamakers; 3 February 1970 (age 56) Brummen, Netherlands
- Party: Party for the Animals
- Other political affiliations: GroenLinks
- Education: Utrecht University (PhD); Erasmus University Rotterdam
- Occupation: Professor; politician

Ingrid Jacoba Visseren-Hamakers (born 3 February 1970) is a Dutch academic and politician of the Party for the Animals (PvdD). She is a professor of environmental policy at Radboud University Nijmegen. Her work focuses on global environmental governance, biodiversity, and sustainability transitions. Since 2023, she has served as a member of the Senate.

== Early life and education ==
Visseren-Hamakers was born on 3 February 1970 in Brummen, Gelderland. She studied environmental and social sciences at Utrecht University, and business administration at Erasmus University Rotterdam.

== Career ==
Visseren-Hamakers held academic positions at Wageningen University and George Mason University in the United States, before joining Radboud University in 2019. Between 2016 and 2019, she served as coordinating lead author for the global assessment report of the Intergovernmental Science-Policy Platform on Biodiversity and Ecosystem Services (IPBES).

Her political career began in Rotterdam, where she was a member of the IJsselmonde borough council from 1998 to 2002, on behalf of GroenLinks. From 2004 to 2007, she served in the party's executive board. She later joined the Party for the Animals (PvdD), and was elected as a member of the Senate in the 2023 election. On 3 February 2025, she succeeded Niko Koffeman as leader of the PvdD Senate group.

=== Visseren-Hamakers Group ===
On 10 November 2025, it was announced that Visseren-Hamakers had left the PvdD Senate group, forming her own independent group. The split followed an internal dispute, after Niko Koffeman had resigned his party membership on 21 October 2025, citing dissatisfaction with the party's political direction. He was supported by fellow senator Peter Nicolaï. As a result, Koffeman and Nicolaï continued together under the party banner, while Visseren-Hamakers formed a separate group. Despite the formal split, Visseren-Hamakers is regarded by the Party for the Animals as the sole legitimate representative of the party in the Senate.

== Electoral history ==
Electoral history of Ingrid Visseren-Hamakers
Year	Body	Party	Pos.	Votes	Result		Ref.
Year	Body	Party	Pos.	Votes	Party seats	Individual	Ref.
2004	European Parliament	GroenLinks	4	[?]	2	Lost	
2023	Senate	Party for the Animals	3	2,112	3	Won	
