= Ton Raven =

Dutch politician

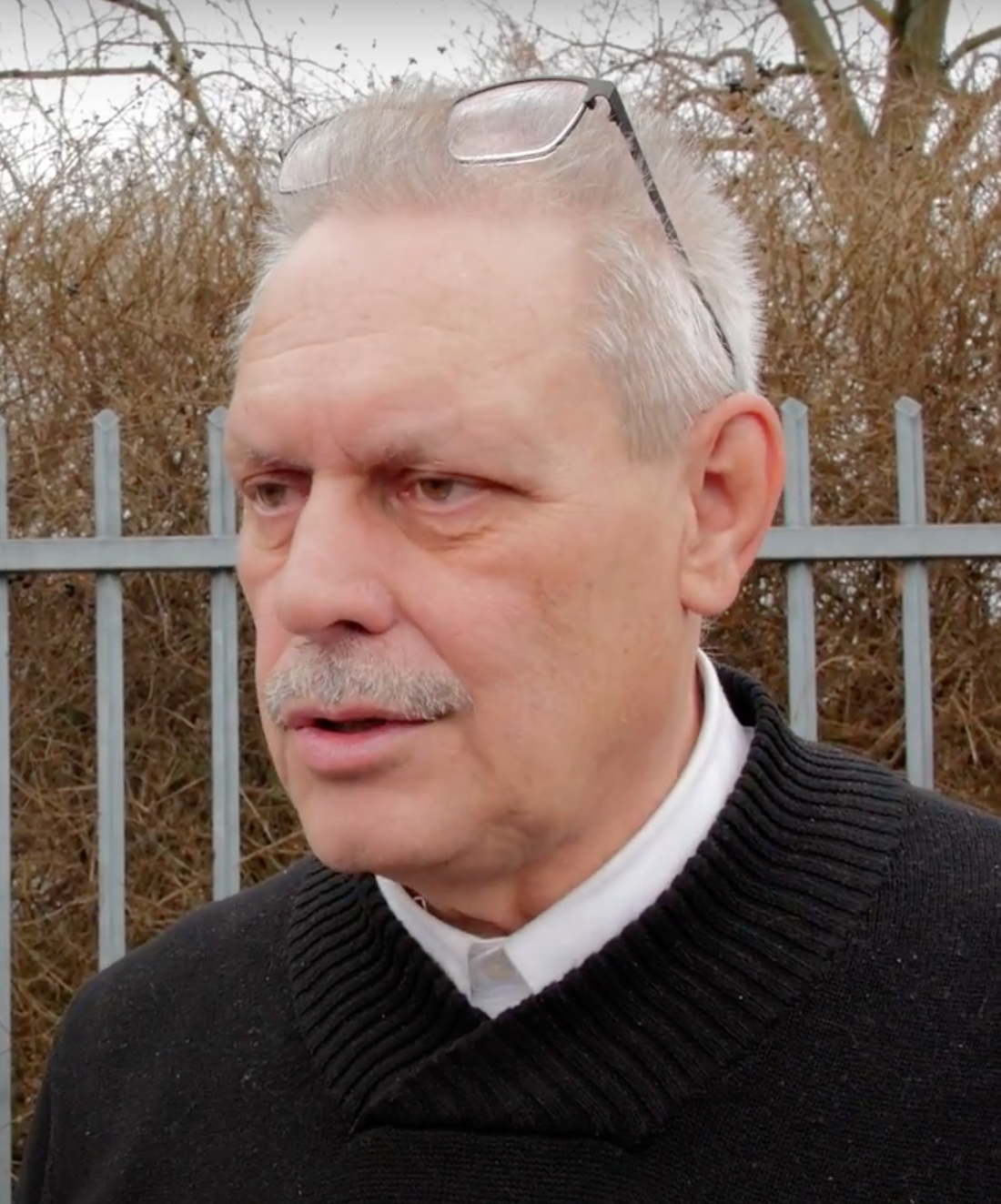

Member of the Senate
- In office 19 January 2021 – 13 June 2023
- Preceded by: Gerben Gerbrandy

Alderman in Sittard-Geleen
- In office 19 February 2020 – 19 January 2021
- In office 2001–2002

Alderman in Geleen
- In office 1994–2000

Member of the Sittard-Geleen municipal council
- Incumbent
- Assumed office 30 March 2022
- In office 2001–2020

Member of the Geleen municipal council
- In office 1990–2000

Personal details
- Born: A.C.M. Raven; 3 November 1957 (age 68) Geleen, Netherlands
- Party: Independent Politics Netherlands; Stadspartij (since 2010); Lokaal-Limburg
- Other political affiliations: Stadspartij Burgerbelangen Geleen (1990–2010); Party New Limburg (2011); Volkspartij Limburg (2015)
- Children: 2

A.C.M. "Ton" Raven (born 3 November 1957) is a Dutch politician, who served as a member of the Senate between 2021 and 2023. In that body, he was the only member of Independent Politics Netherlands. Before he became a senator, Raven had been active in Sittard-Geleen (and earlier Geleen) politics as a municipal councilor and alderman since 1990, representing the local parties Stadspartij Burgerbelangen Geleen and Stadspartij.

== Education and non-political career ==
He attended a mavo high school and studied business administration at hbo level, earning an SPD-I degree. He also served as the chair of an Oud-Geleen youth association and as a neighborhood representative. Raven had a financial job at the municipality Sittard between 1980 and 1988, and he subsequently worked as part of the management of Sportstichting Sittard until he became an alderman in 1994. Besides, he was co-founder and chair of local broadcaster Streekomroep START, that was founded in 1985. He left that organization when he became a municipal councilor in 1990. Between his resignation from the municipal executive in 2002 and 2020, Raven ran a number of businesses in IT and sustainable energy. He also hosted radio shows on the local stations Euregio Radio and Bie Os in the years 2015–20.

Furthermore, Raven chaired the foundation of the Vlug en Lenig women's team for fifteen years and also coached the team. The foundation filed for bankruptcy in 2009 after the team was demoted, and the women's team subsequently continued without support of the foundation. Raven also chaired the local elderly organization KBO St. Augustinus and coached a futsal team of ZVV Awt-Gelaen.

== Politics ==
=== Geleen and Sittard-Geleen ===
He first became involved in local politics in his municipality Geleen when he participated in the 1986 election. He was not elected, and was again on the ballot in the next municipal election four years later. He won a seat in the Geleen municipal council as a member of the local party Stadspartij Burgerbelangen Geleen (City party citizen's interests Geleen). After the 1994 election, he also became alderman of finances, environment, and transport in Geleen's municipal executive and remained in that position for two terms.

In 2001, Geleen merged with the municipalities Sittard and Born to form Sittard-Geleen. A special election was held to determine the members of its municipal council. Raven was the lijsttrekker of Stadspartij Burgerbelangen Geleen and was elected. He again became an alderman. His portfolio was transport, businesses, events, and social affairs. Raven resigned in May 2002 after receiving a motion of no confidence, that was supported by 21 out of 36 council members. Two weeks earlier, he had been celebrating handball club Vlug en Lenig winning the national championship at a bar until the police stopped the party after several complaints at around 5 AM. According to eyewitnesses, a drunken Raven resisted the removal of the approximately fifty partygoers the most and called the police officers names. He initially refused to resign and denied the allegations, saying that he had not been drunk and that there had been a misunderstanding; the barkeeper had allegedly told him that the party could continue until 7 AM. Raven stayed on as municipal councilor after his resignation.

He ran for re-election in the 2006 election, becoming the only councilor of his party. Raven's party and the Stadspartij Sittard-Geleen-Born announced in 2009 that they would merge and would continue under the name Stadspartij (City party). This occurred almost a year after Raven had announced that he was thinking about joining the party Trots op Nederland because of his ambition to become a national politician. He was re-elected in 2010 and ran for member of the States of Limburg in the 2011 provincial election as the third candidate of the Party New Limburg, but was not elected due to the party winning no seats.

Raven was again re-elected to the Sittard-Geleen municipal council in the 2014 election, being placed second on the Stadspartij's party list. He subsequently became the party's caucus leader, succeeding lijsttrekker Fred den Rooijen, who vacated that position due to his party not becoming part of the municipal executive. Shortly thereafter – in May 2014 – Raven wrongfully accused Mayor Sjraar Cox of being biased towards his party during the formation of the new executive. Despite Raven's apologies, all three other Stadspartij councilors left the party. In 2015, he again participated in the provincial election in Limburg, appearing 14th on the list of Volkspartij Limburg. Raven stated that he sympathized with its prominent member Jos van Rey, who was being investigated for corruption.

He remained a member of the Sittard-Geleen council and caucus leader after the 2018 municipal election. During the campaign, Raven had proposed starting a regional cooperation with nearby Belgian and German towns in order to be eligible for subsidies from the European Union. Between September 2018 and January 2019, he went on sick leave due to a cerebral infarction, and his duties were performed by a substitute. Raven left the council to become alderman of finances, businesses, sport, and mobility in February 2020, when a new coalition was formed. The prior coalition had lost its majority due to a departure.

=== Senate (2021–2023) ===
Raven ran for senator in the 2019 Senate election, appearing second on the party list of the Independent Senate Group (later renamed Independent Politics Netherlands), a cooperation of regional parties. He was not elected as his party won one seat. In January 2021, Senator Gerben Gerbrandy left the body due to the workload of serving in a one-man caucus, leading to the appointment of Raven as his replacement. Being the only member of his caucus, Raven is a member of nearly every Senate committee. In December 2021, he pled for a one-time financial compensation for retirees, as pensions had not been indexed since 2009, and he started an online petition.

He participated in the 2022 municipal elections as the Stadspartij's third candidate. He was elected and started serving in the Sittard-Geleen council alongside his position as senator on 30 March. A few weeks later, caucus leader Nancy Kaufmann left the party in favor of the CDA due to a personal conflict with Raven about a possible participation in the coalition. In early April, Raven was chosen by the CDA and the local party EML as informateur to form a governing coalition consisting of three parties in the municipality of Eijsden-Margraten. In the 2023 provincial elections, he appeared fourth on the party list of Lokaal-Limburg – a member party of Independent Politics Netherlands – in South Limburg, while he was placed 24th on the list for the central and northern parts of the province. He was again the second candidate of Independent Politics Netherlands in the 2023 Senate election. The party retained its one seat, causing Raven to leave the body on 13 June. Upon his farewell, he was awarded the grade of Knight of the Order of Orange-Nassau.

== Personal life ==
He is a resident of Sittard-Geleen, has a wife called Petra and has two daughters. Since 2011, Raven has been a baritone in the men's choir Mignon and a drummer in the local marksmen's club Marcellinus en Petrus. In 2013, he won the latter association's Schützenfest and thus became its king that year.

== Electoral history ==
Electoral history of Ton Raven
Year	Body	Party	Pos.	Votes	Result		Ref.
Year	Body	Party	Pos.	Votes	Party seats	Individual	Ref.
2024	European Parliament	vandeRegio	2	458	0	Lost	
