= Ilse Bezaan =

Dutch politician (born 1968)

Member of the Senate
- Incumbent
- Assumed office 27 May 2019

Member of the States-Provincial of North Holland
- Incumbent
- Assumed office 2015

Personal details
- Born: 1 January 1968 (age 58) Amsterdam, Netherlands
- Party: Party for Freedom
- Children: 2
- Education: University of Amsterdam
- Profession: Lawyer

Ilse Bezaan (born 1 January 1968) is a Dutch politician affiliated to the Party for Freedom (PVV).

Bezaan attended a hospitality management college in Maastricht before studying a law degree at the University of Amsterdam. She subsequently worked as a corporate lawyer. From 2006 to 2019 she also ran a yoga school. In 2015 she was elected for the PVV in the Provincial Council of North Holland. In 2019, Bezaan was elected a member of the Senate with preferential votes.

== Electoral history ==
Electoral history of Ilse Bezaan
| Year | Body | Party | Pos. | Votes | Result | | Ref. |
| Year | Body | Party | Pos. | Votes | Party seats | Individual | Ref. |
|---|---|---|---|---|---|---|---|
| 2019 | Senate | Party for Freedom | 7 | 4,229 (Note: Weighted votes) | 5 | Won | |
| 2023 | Senate | Party for Freedom | 6 | | 4 | Won | |
| 2025 | House of Representatives | Party for Freedom | 76 | 125 | 26 | Lost | |
