= Willemijn Aerdts =

Dutch politician (born 1983)

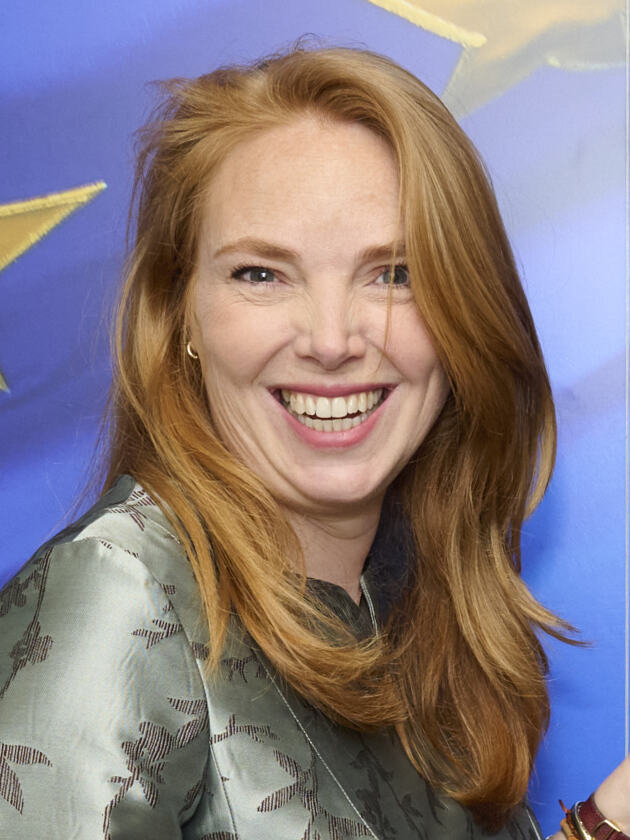
- Aerdts in 2026

State Secretary for the Digital Economy and Digital Sovereignty
- Incumbent
- Assumed office 23 February 2026

Member of the Senate
- In office 13 June 2023 – 23 February 2026

Personal details
- Born: Wilhelmina Johanna Maria Aerdts; 21 April 1983 (age 43)
- Party: Democrats 66
- Education: Utrecht University; Leiden University
- Occupation: Politician; academic

Wilhelmina Johanna Maria "Willemijn" Aerdts (born 21 April 1983) is a Dutch academic and politician of the Democrats 66 (D66), who has served as State Secretary for the Digital Economy and Digital Sovereignty in the Jetten cabinet since 23 February 2026. She previously served as a member of the Senate between 2023 and 2026, and was a lecturer and researcher at the Institute of Security and Global Affairs of Leiden University.

== Career ==
=== Academic career ===
Aerdts obtained her master's degree in International Relations in Historical Perspective from Utrecht University and subsequently obtained an LLM in International Public Law. At Leiden University, she worked on her PhD on the supervision of the Dutch Military Intelligence and Security Service and the AIVD. In May 2023, her book Diensten met geheimen ('Services with secrets') was published.

=== Political career ===
Between 2021 and 2023, Aerdts was the chair of the Els Borst Network, the women's wing of D66. She was placed second on the party's candidate list for the 2023 Senate election. After being elected, she has been a member of the Senate since 13 June 2023.

In February 2026, she was nominated for the position of State Secretary for the Digital Economy and Digital Sovereignty in the Jetten cabinet. She was sworn in on 23 February 2026.

== Bibliography ==
- Diensten met geheimen: Hoe de AIVD en MIVD Nederland veilig houden (2023)
