= Theo Hiddema =

Dutch lawyer and politician (born 1944)

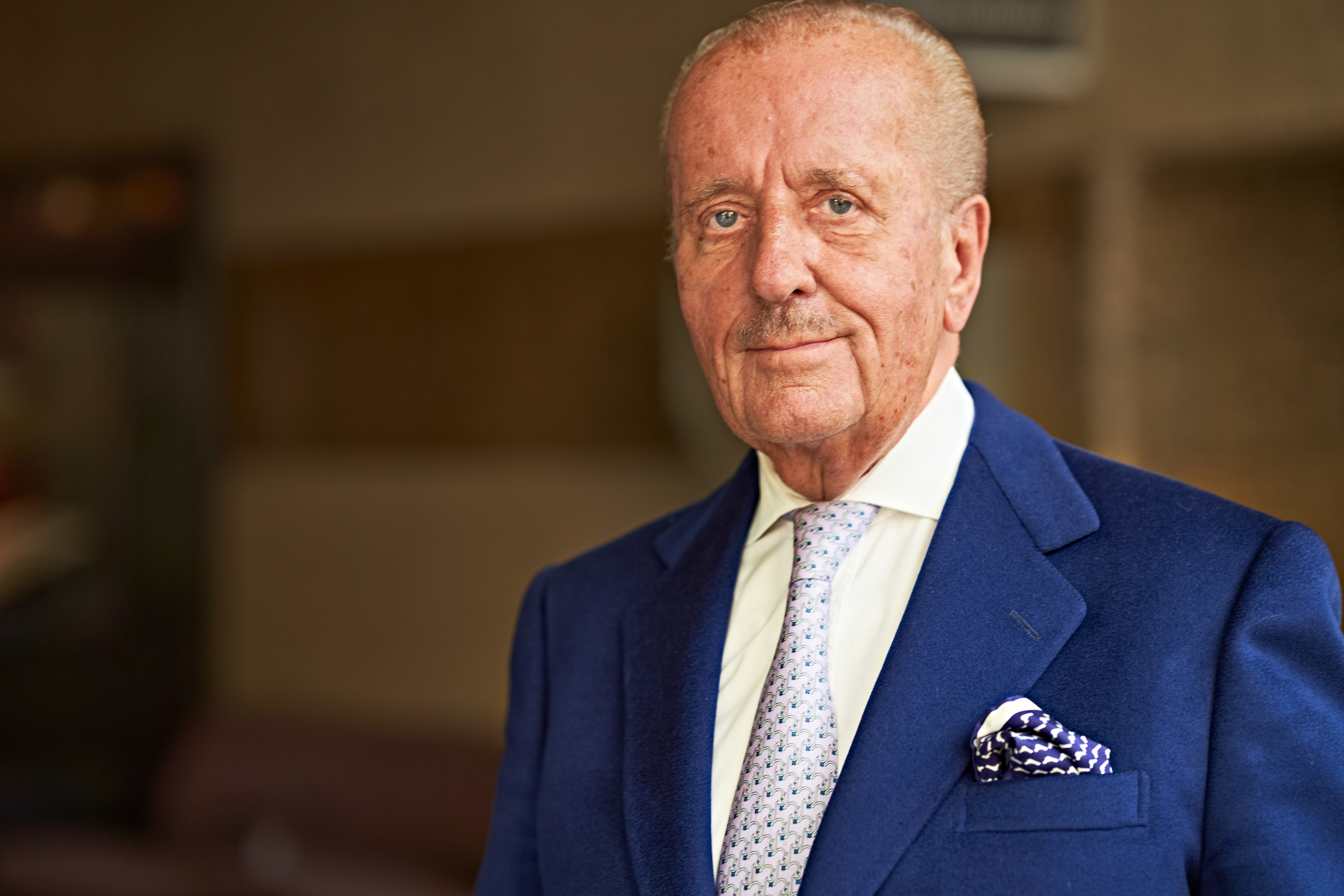
- Hiddema in 2020

Senator of the Netherlands
- In office 13 April 2021 – 13 June 2023

Member of the House of Representatives
- In office 23 March 2017 – 24 November 2020

Personal details
- Born: Theo Upt Hiddema; 1 April 1944 (age 82) Holwert, Netherlands
- Party: FvD (2016–2022); Faction Frentrop (2022–2023)

Theo Upt Hiddema (born 1 April 1944) is a Dutch lawyer, media personality and politician who served as a member of the House of Representatives from 2017 to 2020. A former member of Forum for Democracy (FvD), which he left in 2022, he became a member of the Senate in 2021 following the resignation of Nicki Pouw-Verweij, holding a seat until 2023.

== Early life ==
Theo Hiddema was born on 1 April 1944 in Holwert, Friesland.

== Law ==
Hiddema was accepted to the bar on 10 July 1975 in Maastricht. After an internship with Max Moszkowicz in Maastricht, he founded his own practice in 1981. There are currently two offices, one in Amsterdam and one in Maastricht.

Hiddema became known as a lawyer in several famous cases, one against Florentine Rost van Tonningen-Heubel, the widow of a Dutch national-socialist during World War II, and the case against the violent and criminal Venlo Gang.

== Politics ==
In 2016, Hiddema joined Forum for Democracy (FvD, Dutch: Forum voor Democratie), and was officially allocated a spot high on the electoral roll, second only to the founder and leader of the party, Thierry Baudet. Since FvD managed to get enough electoral votes for two seats in the House of Representatives in the 2017 Dutch general election, Hiddema became a member of the House of Representatives. In November 2020 Hiddema resigned as member of parliament due to "personal circumstances", possibly related to controversies within the party during that time. In December 2020, Hiddema expressed his willingness to stand again as a candidate for the party in March. However, just over a week removed from his announcement, he changed his mind and said he wanted to be removed from the list due to the party's populist approach of opposing the government's coronavirus strategy. In April 2021, he became a FvD senator. In March 2022, he defected from the FvD alongside Paul Frentrop in response to the FvD refusing to attend Volodymyr Zelenskyy's address to the Dutch House of Representatives.
