= Fréderike Geerdink =

Dutch journalist and author (born 1970)

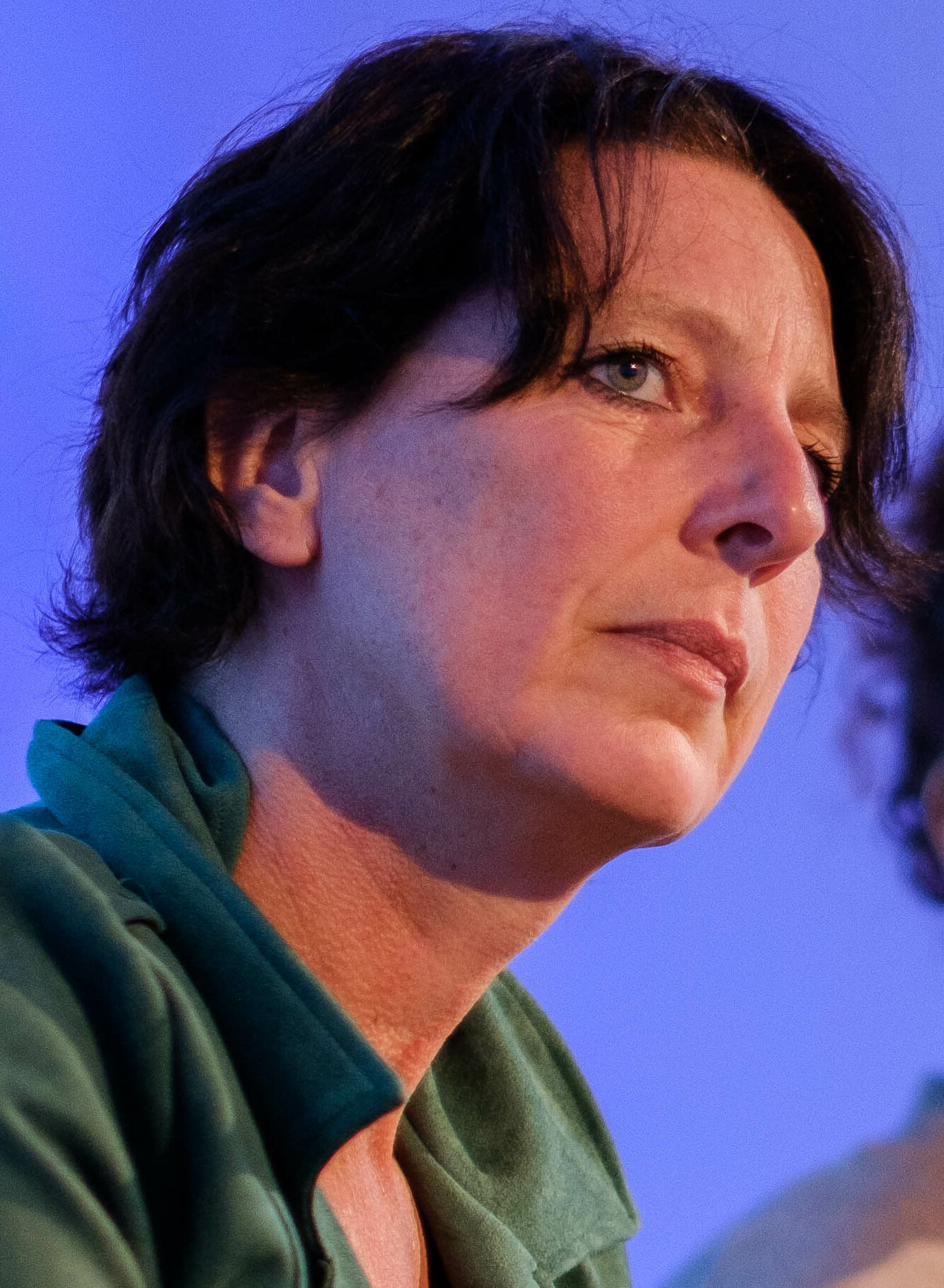
- Fréderike Geerdink (2019)
- Born: Hengelo, Netherlands
- Education: Christelijke Hogeschool Windesheim
- Occupation: Freelance journalist
- Years active: Over 25 years
- Employer(s): The Independent and other outlets
- Known for: Reporting on Kurdish issues from within Turkey
- Notable work: The Boys are Dead
- Website: frederikegeerdink.com

Fréderike Geerdink (born 1970) is a Dutch freelance journalist and author who specializes in reporting on Kurdish women and political issues in Turkey from Diyarbakir, where she was the lone foreign journalist based there between 2012 and 2015. She was twice arrested in Turkey and was deported on 9 September 2015. Following this, she spent one year embedded as a journalist with the Kurdistan Workers' Party.

== Personal ==
Fréderike Geerdink was born in 1970 in the town of Hengelo, Netherlands. Geerdink studied journalism from 1988 to 1992 at the Christelijke Hogeschool Windesheim.

== Career ==
Geerdink has been a journalist for over 25 years and writes in Dutch, Flemish, and English, as well as Turkish. In the Netherlands, her work has appeared in De Pers, Algemeen Nederlands Persbureau (ANP), BNR Newsradio, Elle, Marie Claire, Esta (ceased publication in 2013), Viva, Opzij, Volkskrant Magazine, De Groene Amsterdammer, and Wordt Vervolgd (human rights magazine). As a freelance journalist she submits articles to print newspapers and magazines and radio reports for Dutch, Belgian, British, American media groups, such as Het Parool, The Independent, Al-Monitor, Global Post, and the BBC News. A weekly article of Geerdink appears online at Diken, a Turkish independent news portal. Geerdink was the author of the blog Kurdish Matters and now hosts a subscription-based newsletter called Expert Kurdistan. Her work also appears in the crowd-funding journalism website BeaconReader.com.

== Notable works of journalism ==
Fréderike Geerdink started reporting from Istanbul, Turkey in 2006, but since 2012, she has been located in Diyarbakir, Turkey, which is located in the southeast and predominantly Kurdish region of Turkey, where Geerdink covered Kurdish issues. She was the only foreign journalist reporting from and based inside Diyarbakir between 2012 and 2015.

From Diyarbakir, she has focused on Kurdish issues, as well as the PKK, or Partiya Karkerên Kurdistan (Translated: Kurdistan Workers' Party), which has been classified as terrorist organization in Turkey and by several other states and organizations, including the North Atlantic Treaty Organization (NATO), the United States and the European Union. The group is an advocate for a separate autonomous territory for the Kurdish people.

She is the author of "The Boys are Dead," which was first released in the Netherlands in 2014, and was translated into English and released in October 2015.

Following her deportation from Turkey, she decided to embed herself as a journalist in the PKK and stayed with them for one year. Her second book, "This Fire Never Dies," first released in the Netherlands in 2018, and as an English translation 2021, deals with her time with PKK.

== Turkish deportation ==
The location of Diyarbakir, Turkey is displayed relative to Istanbul and the capital city of Ankara.

Fréderike Geerdink was arrested twice in Turkey. She was arrested the first time in January 2015 and charged with distributing terrorist propaganda on behalf of the PKK.

The second arrest was in September 2015. This time, she was arrested for crossing into a restricted zone and taking part in a protest. She was detained along with 19 other individuals that were traveling with her at the time. She was detained and then released. A few weeks later, she was deported from Turkey.

Geerdink located herself in Netherlands as she appealed her deportation. Geerdink is currently focused on the migration of Syrian and Iraqi Kurdish refugees in Europe.

=== First arrest ===
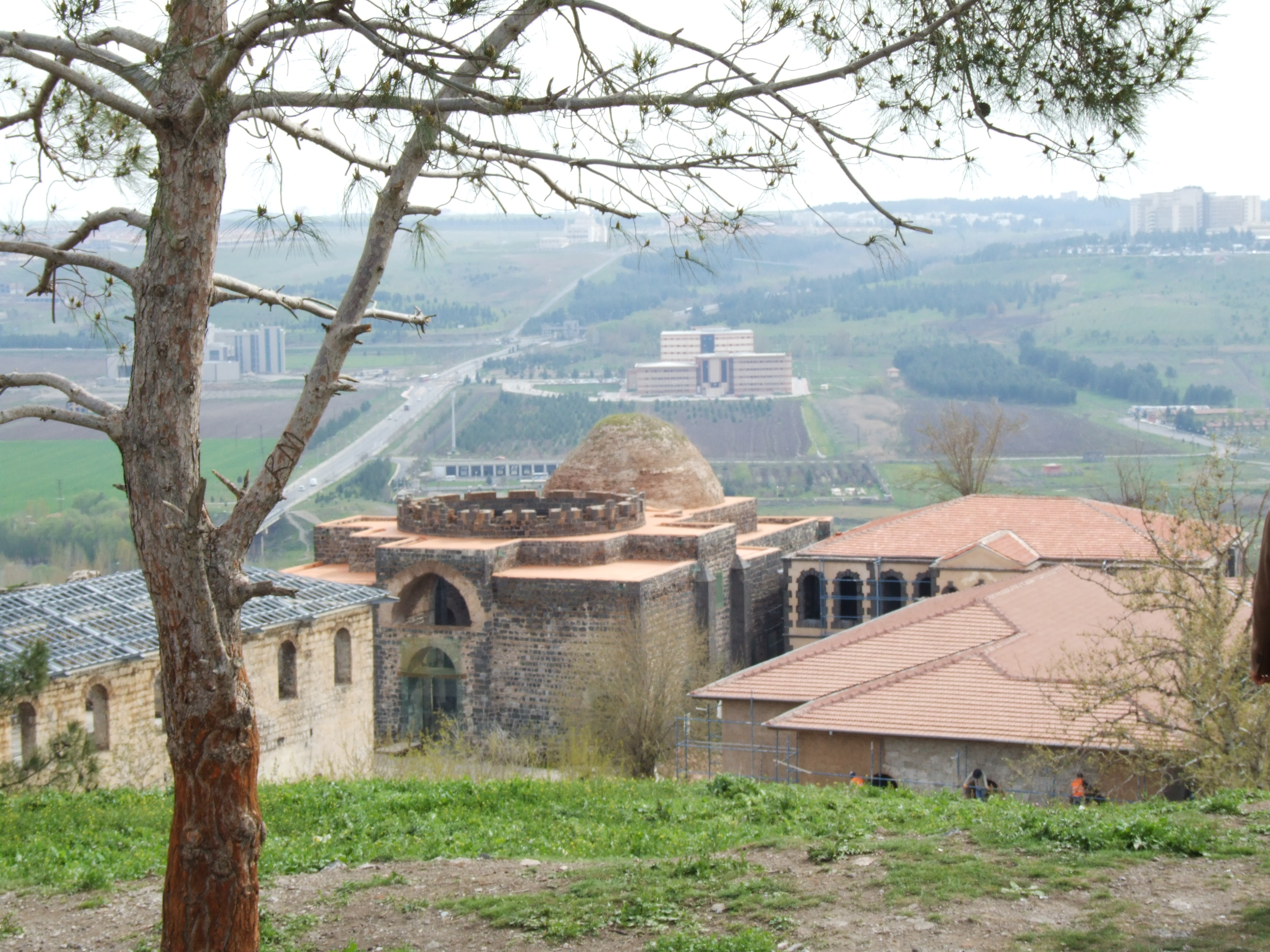
Diyarbakir cityscape.

On 6 January 2015, Fréderike Geerdink's residence in Diyarbakir was searched by the Anti Terrorism Police. She was then detained and questioned. Following that she was charged with distributing terrorist propaganda and supporting the PKK through comments on social media and in her reporting. One of the reasons she had been arrested was because of her interview with PKK leader Cemil Bayik. She stated on Twitter that the investigation went well and that she had nothing to hide from the interview as it was just her doing her job as a journalist. Political leaders and press freedom organizations around the world reacted to her arrest, including Dutch Minister of Foreign Affairs Bert Koenders. Koenders said the intimidation of journalists was not acceptable. After a lengthy court battle, she was acquitted on 13 April 2015.

=== Second incident ===
On 6 September 2015, Fréderike Geerdink was arrested again and this time she was charged with crossing into a restricted zone and taking part in a protest while being there. During her incarceration, she was still able to post on Twitter, and report everything that was happening to her. On 9 September, Fréderike Geerdink was deported from Turkey and sent back to the Netherlands. According to Geerdink, she was transported by military convoy from Yüksekova to Hakkari, she then continued her journey from Hakkari to Van. As the soldiers played loud music, she realized that her time in Turkey was done for the moment, and that she was being deported. She was the third journalist in a month to be exiled from Turkey. The other two journalists were British and they were arrested on charges of terrorism for reporting about the Turkish government's conflict with the PKK youth wing and then deported from Turkey as a result.

Upon Geerdink's return to the Netherlands, her arrest and deportation were protested by a joint statement from the European Federation of Journalists, the International Federation of Journalists, and the Dutch Association of Journalists.

"We find the arrest and deportation of the Dutch journalist Mrs. Frederike Geerdink very alarming and contrary to international law and international treaties, ratified by the Turkish State."

The Committee to Protect Journalists issued the following statement:

""This deportation sends a chilling signal that authorities don't want independent reporting on sensitive Kurdish issues in southeast Turkey," said CPJ Deputy Director Robert Mahoney. "We call on the government in Ankara to allow journalists to report freely from the region and to lift the deportation order against Frederike Geerdink."

While her lawyers are challenging her deportation, Turkish rules say once a person is deported, the person cannot return for 5 years. Geerdink is trying to return to her professional journalism duties in Turkey.

== Writings ==
- De jongens zijn dood (Dutch, 2014) / The Boys are Dead: The Roboski Massacre and the Kurdish Question in Turkey (English, 2015).
  This book is about the Roboski Massacre, and how 35 smugglers were mistakenly killed instead of a group of separatist fighters. The book's English release in 2015 followed a few weeks after her deportation from Turkey. Its original Dutch release was nominated for the Brusse Prize. The nomination for her work said,
  "Fréderike Geerdink is one of those courageous Dutch journalists who do their work in dangerous conflict zones. (...) Her book became a both political and beautiful personal account of the struggle for self determination in Turkish Kurdistan."
- Dit Vuur Dooft Nooit - Een Jaar Bij De PKK (Dutch, May 2018) / This Fire Never Dies - One Year With The PKK (English, February 2021).
  This book covers the year in which Geerdink was embedded in the PKK. It deals with the movement's history, culture, and ideology, as well as with the stories and choices of individual members of the movement.

== See also ==
- Censorship in Turkey
- Human rights in Turkey
- Human rights of Kurdish people in Turkey
- Kurdish–Turkish conflict (1978–present)
