= Party New Limburg =

The Party New Limburg (Dutch: Partij Nieuw Limburg, abbreviated as PNL), was a provincial political party in the Dutch province of Limburg. It had no parliamentary representation, but it was linked to the Independent Senate Group.
