= Caspar van den Berg =

Dutch professor and politician (born 1980)

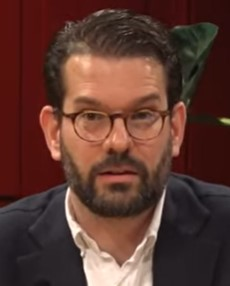
- Van den Berg in 2022

Member of the Senate
- In office 18 January 2022 – 10 September 2024
- Preceded by: Eric van der Burg
- Succeeded by: Cees van de Sanden

Personal details
- Born: Caspar F. van den Berg; 19 May 1980 (age 46) Angerlo, Netherlands
- Party: People's Party for Freedom and Democracy
- Children: 2
- Education: Utrecht University; London School of Economics; Leiden University
- Occupation: Professor; politician

Caspar F. van den Berg (Dutch pronunciation: [ˈkɑspɑr vɑn də(m) ˈbɛr(ə)x]; born 19 May 1980) is a Dutch public administration professor and former politician of the conservative-liberal People's Party for Freedom and Democracy (VVD).

== Early life and career ==
Van den Berg was born in Angerlo, Gelderland in 1980. He studied liberal arts and sciences at Utrecht University between 1999 and 2002. He obtained a master's degree in international relations from the London School of Economics the following year, and he continued studying public administration at Leiden University. Van den Berg received his doctorate in 2011.

He became a professor specialized in global and local governance at the University of Groningen in 2017, and he has simultaneously served as an endowed professor at Leiden University specialized in transitions in the public sector. A member of the VVD, Van den Berg was sworn into the Senate on 18 January 2022, and he was re-elected in May 2023.

In April 2024, Van den Berg proposed to postpone consideration of a bill to permanently cease gas extraction from the Groningen field, which had resulted in induced earthquakes, starting in May. A Senate majority supported Van den Berg's argument to await future legislation on security of the gas supply. The submitter of the bill, State Secretary Hans Vijlbrief, subsequently threatened to resign, as the condition could result in a delay to the field's closure of 1.5 years. Van den Berg declared his comments were based on a misunderstanding, and he withdrew his objection to the bill's consideration.

Van den Berg started serving as chair of Universities of the Netherlands, a trade association, in June 2024. That same month, he expressed his worries in an interview about the coalition agreement of the Schoof cabinet, consisting of Party for Freedom, VVD, NSC, and BBB, that included €1 billion in budget cuts for higher education. Van den Berg told that this implied one or two universities would have to be closed, and he criticized plans to reintroduce increased tuition for students with a study delay. On 10 September 2024, Caspar left the Senate, because he could not combine senatorship with his chairmanship of the Universities of the Netherlands.

Later in September 2024, Van den Berg received an honorary doctorate from Tallinn University of Technology, Estonia, with which he has been affiliated since more than a decade, including as visiting professor.

=== Senate committee assignments ===
- Committee on the Interior
- Committee on Digitization
- Committee on Economic Affairs and Climate
- Committee on European Affairs
- Committee on Justice and Security
- Delegation to the Parliamentary Assembly of the Union for the Mediterranean

== Personal life ==
Van den Berg is married with two sons, and he lived in The Hague as of 2024.
