= Carla Moonen =

Dutch politician

- Carla Moonen in 2021

Member of the Senate
- Incumbent
- Assumed office 11 June 2019

Personal details
- Born: Carla Petronella Micheline Moonen; 5 April 1963 (age 63) Weert, Netherlands
- Party: D66
- Children: 3
- Education: Wageningen University & Research (1987–1992)

Carla Petronella Micheline Moonen (born 5 April 1963) is a Dutch government official and politician. She has been a member of the Dutch Senate for Democrats 66 (D66) since 11 June 2019.

== Early life and career ==
Carla Moonen was born on 5 April 1963 in Weert. Moonen was born into a farming family, her father having been a part of the leadership of the Peel en Maas Midden-Limburg water board for nearly two decades. After completing her education in land and water management in 1984 and rural development in 1986 at the Van Hall Larenstein Hogeschool in Velp, Moonen studied rural economics at Wageningen University from 1987 to 1992.

During this period, Moonen worked as in agricultural engineering for various land projects in Gelderland from 1984 to 1987, and as land agent for two Gelderland heritage and natural foundations until 1991. Moonen then worked as a policy advisor for the Dutch Ministry of Agriculture in the 1990s, as project director at the Ministry of Housing and Spatial Planning from 1999 to 2005 and as deputy director of financial inspections at the Ministry of Finance from 2005 to 2008. Between 2008 and 2013, she was an advisor the Prime Minister in the Ministry of General Affairs. In 2013, Moonen became the first female dike warden (dijkgraaf) of the Brabantse Delta water board, serving until 2017. She has also been executive chairman of the Zorg en Welzijn Pension Fund from 2017 to 2019, of the KoninklijkeNLIngenieurs engineers' association from 2019, and has been a member of the executive of employers' association VNO-NCW from 2018.

== Political career ==
Moonen became a member of the Senate for Democrats 66 (D66) on 11 June 2019. As a senator, Moonen is focused on finance, social security, health, wellness and sports. She has served as secretary of the D66 Senate group since 2020, and as deputy chair of the Senate commission on social welfare since 2023. In 2023, Moonen ran for the position of chair of the D66 Senate group, but lost to Paul van Meenen.

Internationally, Moonen has been a member of the Benelux Parliament from 2020 to 2023 and of the Parliamentary Assembly of the Council of Europe from 2023.

== Personal life ==
Moonen is married, and has three sons.
