= Henk Jan Meijer =

Dutch politician

- Henk Jan Meijer in 2018

Member of the Senate
- Incumbent
- Assumed office 11 June 2019

Mayor of Zwolle
- In office 14 July 2000 – 1 September 2019

Personal details
- Born: 5 August 1961 (age 65) Wassenaar, Netherlands
- Party: VVD
- Children: 4
- Education: University of Groningen

Henk Jan Meijer (born 5 August 1961) is a Dutch politician and government executive for the People's Party for Freedom and Democracy (VVD). He has been a member of the Dutch Senate since 11 June 2019. Meijer also served as mayor of Zwolle from 2000 to 2019.

== Early life ==
Henk Jan Meijer was born on 5 August 1961 in Wassenaar. Meijer attended the HBS-B at the Rijnlands Lyceum Wassenaar from 1963 to 1968 and studied sociology and urban planning at the University of Groningen from 1968 to 1975. From 1975 to 1976, he was a reserve officer in the Royal Marechaussee. From 1976 to 1989, he worked at the Dutch Ministry of Housing, Spatial Planning and the Environment, as well as deputy secretary of the Advisory Council for Spatial Planning.

== Political career ==
=== Local politics in The Hague ===
Meijer became a municipal councilor in The Hague in 1982, where he also served as People's Party for Freedom and Democracy (VVD) leader on the municipal council from 1987 to 1989. From 1989 to 2000, he was alderman responsible for traffic, the city centre, and protected cityscapes. In 1994, he became deputy mayor of The Hague.

=== Mayor of Zwolle ===
On 14 July 2000, Meijer became mayor of Zwolle. He was sworn in for a fourth term as mayor on 9 July 2018, effective 14 July 2018. Meijer announced his intention to step down from his position as Mayor of Zwolle effective 1 September 2019. A few weeks later, Peter Snijders was nominated as mayor by the Zwolle municipal council, starting 16 September 2019. On 30 August 2019, a farewell ceremony was held in the Grote Kerk of Zwolle, during which he received two honors: he was made an honorary citizen of Zwolle and an Officer in the Order of Orange-Nassau.

=== Senate ===
On 11 June 2019, Meijer was sworn in as a member of the Dutch Senate. As a senator, he focuses on infrastructure, water management and spatial planning, internal affairs and public safety, and housing. He also chairs the Senate Committee on Infrastructure, Water Management and the Environment (IWO) and is vice-chair of the Parliamentary Inquiry Committee on the Effectiveness of Anti-Discrimination Legislation. Since 1 January 2025, he has been vice-chair of the VVD Senate group.

Meijer has also held several side functions aside from his membership in the Senate. After the 2022 local elections, Meijer was appointed as informateur by the VVD in Almere.

=== Acting mayor of Enschede ===
On 18 November 2020, Meijer was appointed acting mayor of Enschede by the King's commissioner in Overijssel as a temporary replacement for Onno van Veldhuizen, who was severely affected by the coronavirus. The appointment took effect on 19 November 2020. On 19 March 2021, Van Veldhuizen returned to work as mayor of Enschede.

== Personal life ==
Meijer is married, and has two daughters. He has two sons from a previous marriage.
