= Mirjam Krijnen =

Dutch politician (born 1973)

Member of the Senate
- In office 27 September 2022 – 13 June 2023
- Preceded by: Kees Vendrik

Personal details
- Born: 7 May 1973 (age 53) Berkel-Enschot, Netherlands
- Party: GroenLinks
- Children: 2
- Education: Radboud University
- Occupation: Diplomat; charity executive; politician

Mirjam A.J. Krijnen (born 7 May 1973) is a Dutch diplomat and politician of the progressive party GroenLinks. She served as a member of the Senate between September 2022 and June 2023, and she has worked for Aidsfonds (AIDS fund).

== Early life and career ==
Krijnen was born in 1973 in the North Brabant village of Berkel-Enschot, where she also grew up. She studied history and the German language at Radboud University Nijmegen, graduating in early 1998, and spent some time in Norway and Germany as a student.

Krijnen started her career in September 2000 at the Ministry of Foreign Affairs as a Germany and Western Europe policy officer. Three years later, she became second secretary of development cooperation at the Dutch embassy in Belgrade, and she later worked as first secretary at embassies in Islamabad (2006–08) and Washington, D.C. (2009–13). In April 2008, while she was stationed in Islamabad, embassy personnel was temporarily relocated to a luxury hotel due to security concerns as a result of the release of the short film Fitna, which is critical of Islam, by Dutch politician Geert Wilders. It had sparked protests against the Netherlands in several Muslim countries. Following her diplomatic career, Krijnen worked for another five years at the Ministry of Foreign Affairs, filling the positions of coordinator of the women's rights and gender equality task force and of management support director starting in May 2016.

She participated in the May 2019 Senate election as the ninth candidate of GroenLinks. Krijnen was not elected, as her party received eight seats. In September 2019, she joined the management team of Aidsfonds, an Amsterdam HIV/AIDS charity, as international programs director. After an investigation by Aidsfonds concluded that a relatively small amount of worldwide HIV/AIDS funding was spent on LGBT people, Krijnen advocated for more targeted services and safe spaces, saying that LGBT people are less likely to use care for the general population due to discrimination.

Krijnen was appointed to the Senate on 27 September 2022 because of her position on the party list in 2019 after Senator Kees Vendrik had stepped down to become chair of the Platform for Social Dialogue and Reflection on Climate Policy. She kept working for Aidsfonds until January 2023. Krijnen ran for re-election in March 2023, being placed 11th on the party list. GroenLinks won seven seats, causing Krijnen's term to end on 13 June.

=== Committee memberships ===
- Committee on Education, Culture and Science
- Committee on European Affairs
- Committee on Foreign Affairs, Defence and Development Cooperation
- Committee on Health, Welfare and Sport
- Committee on Justice and Security

== Personal life ==
Her husband is called Arend, and they have two sons. She resides in Voorburg.
