= Paul Frentrop =

Dutch politician, professor and journalist

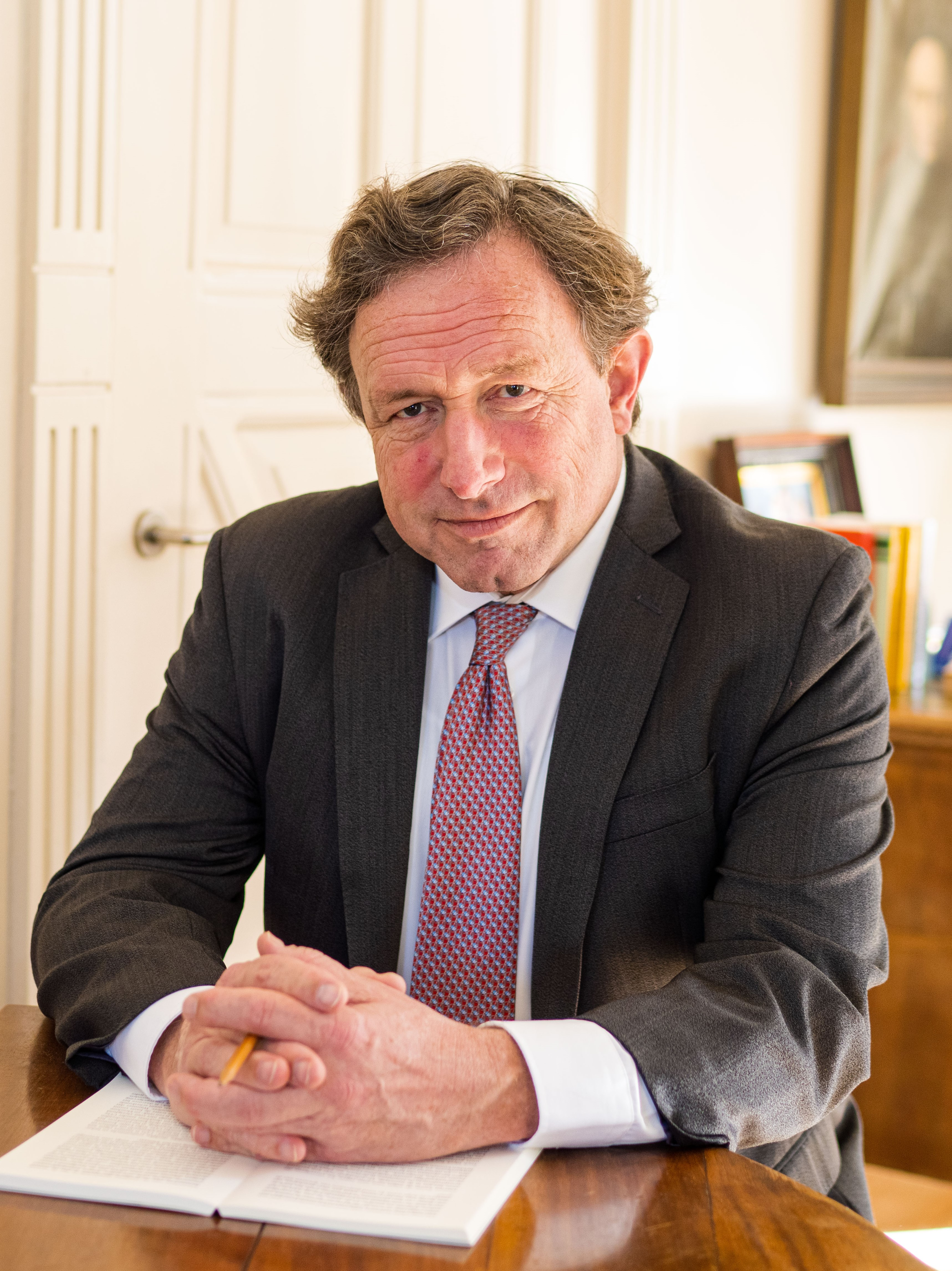
- Paul Frentrop 2021

Leader of the Forum for Democracy in the Senate of the Netherlands
- Incumbent
- Assumed office 1 September 2020
- Preceded by: Paul Cliteur

Member of the Senate
- Incumbent
- Assumed office 2019

Personal details
- Born: Paul Marie Louis Frentrop; 18 March 1954 (age 72) The Hague, Netherlands
- Party: FvD (2017–22); Faction Frentrop (2022–)

Paul Marie Louis Frentrop (born 18 March 1954) is a Dutch politician, professor and journalist who has been a member of the Senate for the Forum for Democracy (FvD) party from 2019 to 2022.

== Biography ==
Frentrop studied psychology and business administration, obtaining a PhD in the latter in 2002. Until 1992, he worked as a financial editor for Het Financieele Dagblad and later NRC Handelsblad. He has also worked as a columnist in other media, such as De Groene Amsterdammer. From 2011 to 2014, he was a professor of corporate governance and capital markets at Nyenrode Business University.

== Political career ==
Frentrop has been a member of the Senate since 2019. In 2020 he wrote the book The havoc of ten years of Rutte with party leader Thierry Baudet. On December 31, 2020, it was announced that he is the first list successor in the House of Representatives to take the vacant seat of Theo Hiddema. He also previously served as interim chairman of the FvD in March 2017 while Baudet was being sworn in as a Member of Parliament.

In 2020, he became the FvD's leader and spokesman in the Senate succeeding Paul Cliteur. In March 2022, he defected from the FvD alongside Theo Hiddema in response to the FvD refusing to attend Volodymyr Zelenskyy's address to the House of Representatives.

== Electoral history ==
A (possibly incomplete) overview of Dutch elections Frentrop participated in
Election	Party	Candidate number	Votes
2017 Dutch general election	Forum for Democracy	5	259
2019 Dutch provincial elections in North Holland	Forum for Democracy	16	1,199
2019 European Parliament election in the Netherlands	Forum for Democracy	11	2,759
2019 Dutch Senate election	Forum for Democracy	4	
2021 Dutch general election	Forum for Democracy	50	309
