= Hugo Doornhof =

Dutch politician

Member of the Senate
- Incumbent
- Assumed office 11 June 2019

Personal details
- Born: 18 February 1978 (age 48) Nijkerkerveen, Netherlands
- Party: CDA
- Children: 2
- Education: Leiden University

Hugo Doornhof (born 18 February 1978) is a Dutch lawyer and politician. He has been a member of the Dutch Senate for the Christian Democratic Appeal (CDA) since 11 June 2019.

== Early life and law career ==
Hugo Doornhof was born on 18 February 1978 in Nijkerkerveen, where he grew up and where his mother and grandfather had municipal councilors. After attending secondary school in Amersfoort, Doornhof studied civil law and law and public administration at Leiden University from 1996 to 2002.

After finishing his studies, Doornhof began work as a lawyer specializing in administrative and environmental law in 2002. In 2013, Doornhof became a partner at the law firm AKD in Amsterdam. He has also been a lecturer for a study center operated by the Association of Netherlands Municipalities since 2011, and for the Vrije Universiteit Amsterdam since 2019. In 2025, Doornhof sued on behalf of the Central Jewish Board in the Netherlands (Centraal Joods Overleg) to stop a performance by Bob Vylan in Nijmegen, citing chants by Vylan which were perceived as antisemitic uttered by Vylan during a performance at Paradiso in Amsterdam, but was unsuccessful.

== Political career ==
Doornhof first entered politics in 2000, when he was elected by preferential votes into the municipal council of Nijkerk for the Christian Democratic Appeal (CDA). Doornhof was the leader of the CDA faction in the municipal council from 2006 to 2014, when he stepped down as municipal councilor.

In 2019, Doornhof became a member of the Senate for the CDA. As a senator, Doornhof focuses on justice and internal affairs. In 2022, Doornhof was one of four CDA senators to vote against the abolition of the mandatory waiting period for abortions in the Netherlands. In 2024, he was the only CDA senator to vote against the Dispersal Act (Spreidingswet).

== Personal life ==
Doornhof is married, and has a son and a daughter.

He became a member of the Order of Orange-Nassau in March 2014.
