= Jonathan Soeharno =

Dutch lawyer, professor, and senator

Member of the Senate
- In office 28 September 2021 – 1 February 2022
- Preceded by: Ben Knapen
- Succeeded by: Ben Knapen

Personal details
- Born: Jonathan Emanuël Soeharno; 27 July 1977 (age 49) The Hague, Netherlands
- Party: Christian Democratic Appeal
- Education: Utrecht University; Radboud University
- Occupation: Lawyer; professor; politician

Jonathan Emanuël Soeharno (born 27 July 1977) is a Dutch lawyer, professor, and politician. He has been working for law firm De Brauw Blackstone Westbroek since 2008 and as a professor at the University of Amsterdam since 2012. He served as a member of the Senate on behalf of the Christian Democratic Appeal (CDA) for four months between 2021 and 2022 as the replacement of Ben Knapen.

== Early life and education ==
Soeharno was born in 1977 in The Hague and is of Indonesian descent. He completed his secondary education on gymnasium level and did not start his higher education for another two years. During this period, he traveled through the United States, where he did volunteer work and served as a bassist in a band. Between 1997 and 2003, Soeharno studied theology at Utrecht University followed by five years of legal theory. He simultaneously studied philosophy at Radboud University Nijmegen and the University of Münster in the years 2000–05. He obtained his doctorate in legal theory from Utrecht University in 2009 after finishing his dissertation titled The Integrity of the Judge: A Philosophical Inquiry. Soeharno was also a visiting scholar at the University of Cambridge's Pembroke College in 2006.

== Career ==
He started working as a lawyer for De Brauw Blackstone Westbroek in Amsterdam in 2008. He initially worked for its finance department, but his focus later shifted to integrity, ESG, human rights, and disciplinary and governance matters. Soeharno also started teaching ethics, judgement, and disciplinary law at the Training and Study Centre for the Judiciary (SSR) the following year, he became a judicial integrity research fellow at Utrecht University's Montaigne Centre for Rule of Law and Administration of Justice, and he served as an editor of the Netherlands Journal of Legal Philosophy. In 2012, he became a professor at the University of Amsterdam. His specialty is administration of justice and legal philosophy, and he devoted his inaugural speech to the renewed interest in oaths. Soeharno remained active as a lawyer and as a teacher for the SSR, and he would later also take a job as deputy judge at the commerce chamber of the Court of Appeal of 's-Hertogenbosch. At the university, he started serving on the scientific integrity committee in 2013, and he was program director of its Honours College of Law from 2015 to 2021. During a conference, he pled for the involvement of theologians in the drafting of new legislation, as it could lead to more just laws.

Soeharno participated in the 2019 Senate election as the tenth candidate of the CDA. He was not elected, as his party won nine seats. Following the stepping down of Senator Ben Knapen in 2021 to serve as Minister of Foreign Affairs, Soeharno was appointed to the Senate, and he was sworn in on 28 September. He was on the Committee for Economic Affairs and Climate Policy / Agriculture, Nature and Food Quality and the Committee for Social Affairs and Employment. Soeharno remained active in his other positions with the exception of deputy judge. He stepped down as senator after 1 February 2022 to allow for the return of Knapen, whose stint as minister had ended due to the swearing in of the fourth Rutte cabinet. When Minister for Legal Protection Franc Weerwind was proposing reforms of oversight of the legal profession to parliament, Soeharno signed a letter with over twenty others criticizing plans to have a new national regulator operate on behalf of the Netherlands Bar. They argued the body should be independent.

Soeharno ran for re-election to the Senate in 2023. He was placed tenth on the party list, but the CDA received only six seats.

== Other activities ==
Soeharno holds and has held several positions next to his job. He has been chair of the advisory board of the Protestant Theological University (since 2015), the supervisory board of the Ronald McDonald Kinderfonds (since 2014), and the supervisory board of the Centre for Organisational Integrity (since 2019). He has also been a member of the Loorbach Committee (2016–18), which advised the Netherlands Bar on changes to its code of conduct; the Disciplinary Court of Appeal for Lawyers (since 2020); Radboud University's supervisory board (2021); the Dutch Securities Institute's disciplinary committee (2017–21); the Prins Bernhard Cultuurfonds's advisory committee on grants (since 2021); and a committee advising the government on Article 57 of the Constitution (since 2023).

== Personal life ==
Soeharno is a resident of Amsterdam as of 2018.

== Bibliography ==
- 2009 – The Integrity of the Judge: A Philosophical Inquiry
- 2014 – De waarde van de eed; English translation: The Value of the Oath (2020)
- 2017 – Durven denken: inleiding in de logica voor juristen; English translation: Logic for Lawyers: An Introduction (2021)
- 2022 – Integriteit in de zakelijke advocatuur: normenkader en praktijk (Integrity in the corporate legal profession: framework of norms and practice; 2022); together with Emilie van Rijckevorsel-Teeuwen and Jan Loorbach
