= Otto Hermans =

Dutch politician (born 1950)

Member of the Senate
- Incumbent
- Assumed office 2019

Personal details
- Born: 1950 (age 75–76) Schimmert, Limburg, Netherlands
- Party: JA21
- Other political affiliations: Forum for Democracy (until 2020)

Otto Hermans (born 29 March 1950) is a Dutch politician and a member of the Senate for JA21.

Hermans studied dentistry at the Catholic University of Nijmegen and worked as a dentist for over thirty years. He was initially appointed as a temporary Senator in 2019 to take over from Nicki Pouw-Verweij who was on maternity leave.

After Brexit, Hermans was preferred over Robert Baljeu (Group Otten) due to preferential votes cast in the Senate elections 2019 for him and Hugo Berkhout, and as a result of which he returned to the Senate as a full member on 18 February 2020. Hermans was originally a member of the Forum for Democracy but joined JA21 along with other former FvD Senators in 2020.
