= Jeroen Recourt =

Dutch politician and judge

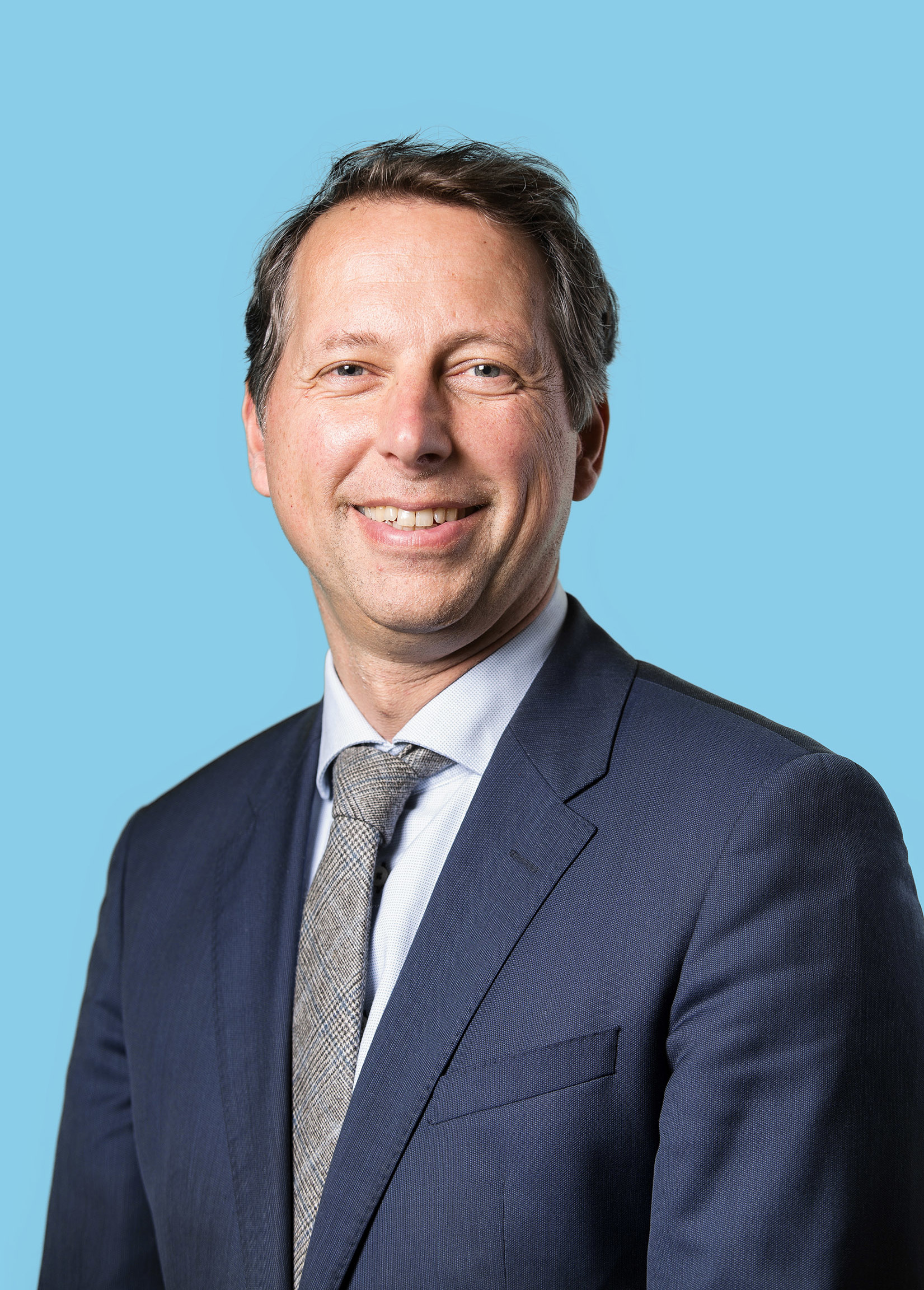

Member of the Senate
- Incumbent
- Assumed office 11 June 2019

Member of the House of Representatives
- In office 17 June 2010 – 23 March 2017

Personal details
- Born: Jeroen Recourt; 4 July 1970 (age 56) Dordrecht, Netherlands
- Party: Labour Party (until 2026); PRO (since 2026)
- Education: ? (LL.M.)
- Occupation: Politician, judge
- Website: (in Dutch) Labour Party website

Jeroen Recourt (born 4 July 1970) is a Dutch politician and former judge. He has served in the Senate sinds 2019, representing Progressief Nederland (PRO). As a member of the Labour Party (PvdA) he was an MP between 17 June 2010 and 23 March 2017. He focused on matters of the judiciary and the Netherlands Antilles.

Recourt worked as a probation officer from 1993 to 1999. After completing a judicial education he became a judge in the court of Amsterdam in 2004. Successively he was a judge of the Joint Court of Justice of the Netherlands Antilles and Aruba in Oranjestad from 2006 to 2010. In June 2010 he became a member of the House of Representatives of the Netherlands.
