= Jan Keunen =

Dutch ophthalmologist and member of the Senate

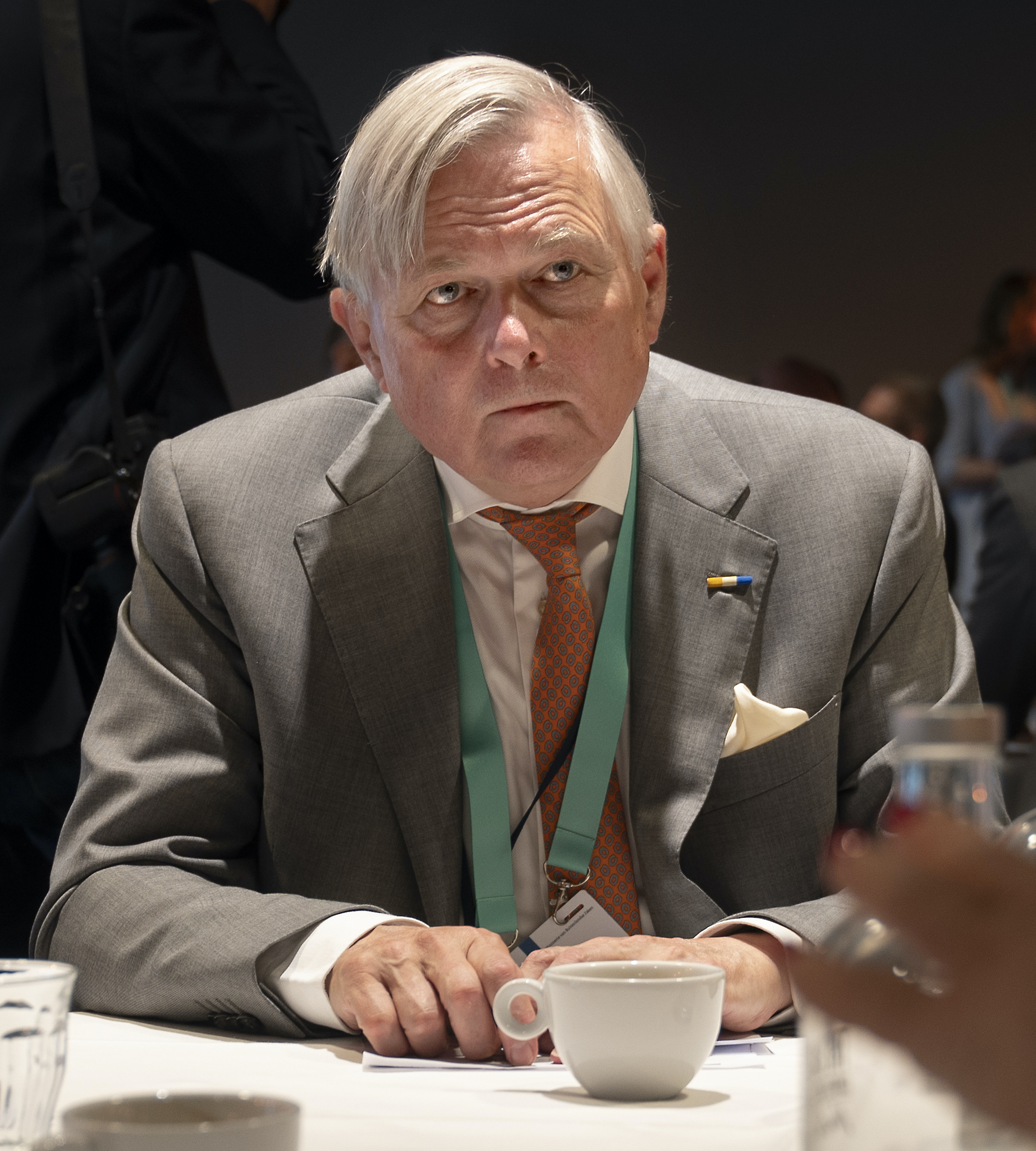
- Keunen at a 2022 conference for ambassadors

Member of the Senate
- In office 26 October 2020 – 13 June 2023
- Preceded by: Roel Wever

Personal details
- Born: Johannes Ernest Everard Keunen; 2 October 1954 (age 72) Roermond, Netherlands
- Party: People's Party for Freedom and Democracy
- Spouse: Florence Lohuis (m. 1989; died 2014)
- Children: 2
- Education: Radboud University Nijmegen, Utrecht University
- Occupation: Ophthalmologist, professor

Johannes Ernest Everard "Jan" Keunen (born 2 October 1954) is a Dutch ophthalmologist, professor, and politician. After studying medicine at Radboud University Nijmegen and receiving his doctorate in 1988, he worked at academic hospitals in Utrecht, Leiden, and Nijmegen. He served as a member of the Senate between 2020 and 2023. Keunen is a member of the conservative–liberal People's Party for Freedom and Democracy (VVD) and has supported banning the sale of consumer fireworks.

== Early life and education ==
Keunen was born in 1954 in the Dutch city of Roermond to Rudy Keunen (1921–1996) and Béatrice Finály (1925). His father was the president of an Eindhoven leather tannery, which was founded by his great-grandfather in 1828, while his mother worked as a nurse. Keunen grew up with two sisters and one brother, and he attended the Eindhoven secondary school Scholengemeenschap Augustinianum from 1967 to 1972 at HBS-B level. He subsequently studied medicine at Radboud University Nijmegen, graduating in 1979, and served as a reservist at the Utrecht military hospital Dr. A. Mathijsen. Starting in 1981, Keunen was trained as an ophthalmologist at the Ooglijdersgasthuis in Utrecht. He became a junior staff member there in 1985, when he started studying at Utrecht University. He received his doctorate from that university three years later after finishing his dissertation titled Densitometry in diseases and senescence of the human retina.

== Medical career ==
Keunen stayed at the Ooglijdersgasthuis after completing his studies. He moved to the Academic Hospital Utrecht in 1989, when the Ooglijdersgasthuis became part of that hospital. In the years 1990–91, he visited the University of Chicago's Visual Sciences Center as a Fulbright Scholar.

Keunen took a job as ophthalmology department head and professor at the Leiden University Medical Center in 1995. His specialization was ocular oncology. In 2003, he also became chair of Vision 2020 Netherlands, an initiative of the World Health Organization to eliminate avoidable blindness and visual impairment. The initiative concluded that over 200,000 people in the Netherlands were unnecessarily suffering from these conditions. While working in Leiden, Keunen also served as scientific secretary and secretary of the professional organization Nederlands Oogheelkundig Gezelschap (NOG) starting in 1995 and as European co-chair of The International Agency for the Prevention of Blindness. He continued working at the Leiden hospital until February 2005.

Thereafter, Keunen served as teacher, professor, and head of the ophthalmology department at the Radboud University Medical Center. Keunen's research has focussed on laser surgery and new treatments for patients with eye cancer and retina disorders including macular degeneration. His department was the first in the Netherlands to use a microsecond laser in 2007 and the Pascal Photocoagulator in 2008. Keunen cut back his hours after his wife's death in 2014 and became acting department head. That same year, he was appointed to the Health Council of the Netherlands, which advises the parliament and the government and has over 100 members. Keunen retired from the Radboud UMC in 2019 with his farewell lecture being planned for June 2020. However, it was postponed by one year due to the COVID-19 pandemic. Keunen was made an Officer in the Order of Orange-Nassau after his lecture in Saint Stephen's Church in Nijmegen.

During his career, he has called for a ban on the sale of consumer fireworks around New Year's Eve, as accidents can cause major eye injuries. He has argued consumer fireworks should be replaced by organized displays. Besides, he has promoted the use of safety glasses while being close to fireworks. In 2014, he was one of the initiators of a manifesto against consumer fireworks, which has been signed by hundreds of thousands of individuals and organizations. Keunen has also warned against illegal laser pointers.

== Politics ==
Keunen has been a member of the VVD since about 1990 and a member of the party's health care network since the early 2000s. Besides, he was the chair of VVD Nijmegen starting in 2014 and became chair of the organization VVD Rijk van Nijmegen when the former chapter merged with a few others in 2016. He remained its chair until January 2019, and he is still a board member of VVD Rijk van Nijmegen. During the 2019 Dutch Senate election, Keunen was placed fourteenth on the VVD's party list. He was not elected, as his party received 12 seats. Keunen was installed as senator on 26 October 2020 after Roel Wever had vacated his seat to accept the position of mayor of Heerlen. Avine Fokkens-Kelder was higher on the list, but she declined the position. Keunen simultaneously left the Health Council. He did not run for re-election in May 2023, and his term ended on 13 June.

When the VVD was debating its stance against a proposed consumer fireworks ban in early 2025, Keunen presented a petition in support of such a ban signed by 450 members to member of parliament Ingrid Michon.

=== Parliamentary committees ===
- Committee for the Interior and High Council of State/General Affairs and Royal Family
- Committee for Immigration and Asylum/Justice and Home Affairs Council
- Committee for Kingdom Relations
- Committee for Health, Welfare and Sport

== Personal life ==
Keunen married divorce attorney Florence Lohuis (1961–2014) on 14 April 1989 in Montfoort. They have two children, Victor (1991) and Béatrice (1994). Keunen is a resident of Nijmegen.

== Decorations ==
- Order of Orange-Nassau
  - Officer (4 June 2021)

== Selected publications ==
- Oosterhuis JA, Journée-de Korver HG, Keunen JE (February 1998). "Transpupillary thermotherapy: results in 50 patients with choroidal melanoma". Archives of Ophthalmology. 116 (2): 157–162. doi:10.1001/archopht.116.2.157. PMID 9488266.
- Sommerburg O, Keunen JE, Bird AC, van Kuijk FJ (August 1998). "Fruits and vegetables that are sources for lutein and zeaxanthin: the macular pigment in human eyes". British Journal of Ophthalmology. 82 (8): 907–910. doi:10.1136/bjo.82.8.907. PMC 1722697. PMID 9828775.
- Boon CJ, den Hollander AI, Hoyng CB, Cremers FP, Klevering BJ (March 2008). "The spectrum of retinal dystrophies caused by mutations in the peripherin/RDS gene". Progress in Retinal and Eye Research. 27 (2): 213–235. doi:10.1016/j.preteyeres.2008.01.002. PMID 18328765. S2CID 31756424.
- Boon CJ, Klevering BJ, Leroy BP, Hoyng CB, Keunen JE, den Hollander AI (May 2009). "The spectrum of ocular phenotypes caused by mutations in the BEST1 gene". Progress in Retinal and Eye Research. 28 (3): 187–205. doi:10.1016/j.preteyeres.2009.04.002. PMID 19375515. S2CID 22339729.
