= Bob van Pareren =

Dutch politician

Member of the Hoogheemraadschap van Rijnland
- Incumbent
- Assumed office 2023

Member of the Senate of the Netherlands
- In office 2019–2023

Member of the Provincial Council of South Holland
- In office 2019–2023

Personal details
- Born: 6 August 1947 (age 78) Bussum, Netherlands
- Party: Farmer-Citizen Movement (since 2023)
- Other political affiliations: Forum for Democracy (2018–2020); JA21 (2020-2023)

Bob van Pareren (born August 6, 1948) is a Dutch politician and businessman who was a member of the Senate of the Netherlands.

Van Pareren holds a degree in business administration from Nyenrode Business University. He was installed as a Senator for the Forum for Democracy party in 2019 and was the treasurer for the FvD. He was also a Member of the Provincial Council of South Holland between 2019 and 2023. In November 2020, he left the FvD and formed his own Van Pareren faction in the Senate which later became a part of JA21.

In March 2023 he was elected to the Hoogheemraadschap van Rijnland. The entire JA21 group switched to the Farmer-Citizen Movement in October 2023.
