= Gala Veldhoen =

Dutch judge and politician

- Gala Veldhoen in 2023

Member of the Senate
- Incumbent
- Assumed office 11 June 2019

Personal details
- Born: Gala Venus Mohamed Veldhoen; 27 March 1971 (age 55) Amsterdam, Netherlands
- Party: GroenLinks (until 2026); PRO (since 2026)
- Spouse: Henny Vrienten (m. 2001; died 2022)
- Children: 2
- Education: University of Amsterdam (1989–1995)

Gala Venus Mohamed Veldhoen (born 27 March 1971) is a Dutch politician and former lawyer and judge. She has been a member of the Dutch Senate since 11 June 2019 for GroenLinks and after 2026 for Progressief Nederland.

== Early life ==
Gala Veldhoen was born on 27 March 1971 in Amsterdam to artist Aat Veldhoen, and a mother of Vietnamese-Somali descent. Veldhoen attended the Barlaeus Gymnasium, where she became involved in a student campaign in opposition to the installing of a female principal in 1988, criticizing the barring of male applicants from consideration for the position as "negative discrimination." In December 1988, she publicly debated minister Hedy d'Ancona on the subject. Veldhoen studied law at the University of Amsterdam from 1989 to 1995, after which she worked at the European Parliament for two years until 1997.

Veldhoen worked as a media lawyer for the law firm Kalff Katz & Koedooder in Amsterdam from 1997 to 2007. In 2007, she became a cantonal and trade judge for the Middle Netherlands district court, served as a (youth) criminal judge from 2013 until January 2019 and as deputy judge from January to June 2019. Veldhoen was also chair of the Reclame Code Commissie from 2015 to 2016 and a member of the supervisory board of the Nederlandse Publieke Omroep from 2016 to 2019, alongside many other executive positions in public and cultural life.

== Political career ==
Veldhoen became a member of the Senate on 11 June 2019 for GroenLinks, and after 2026 for Progressief Nederland. As a senator, she has focused on justice and public safety, as well as media policy. She has also served as chairperson of the Senate Committee for Digitalization since 16 January 2024, and vice-chair of the Committee on Education, Culture, and Science since 27 June 2023.

== Personal life ==
Veldhoen is married. From 2001 to 2022, Veldhoen was married to musician and Doe Maar frontman Henny Vrienten, with whom she had two sons.
