= Saskia Kluit =

Dutch politician (born 1973)

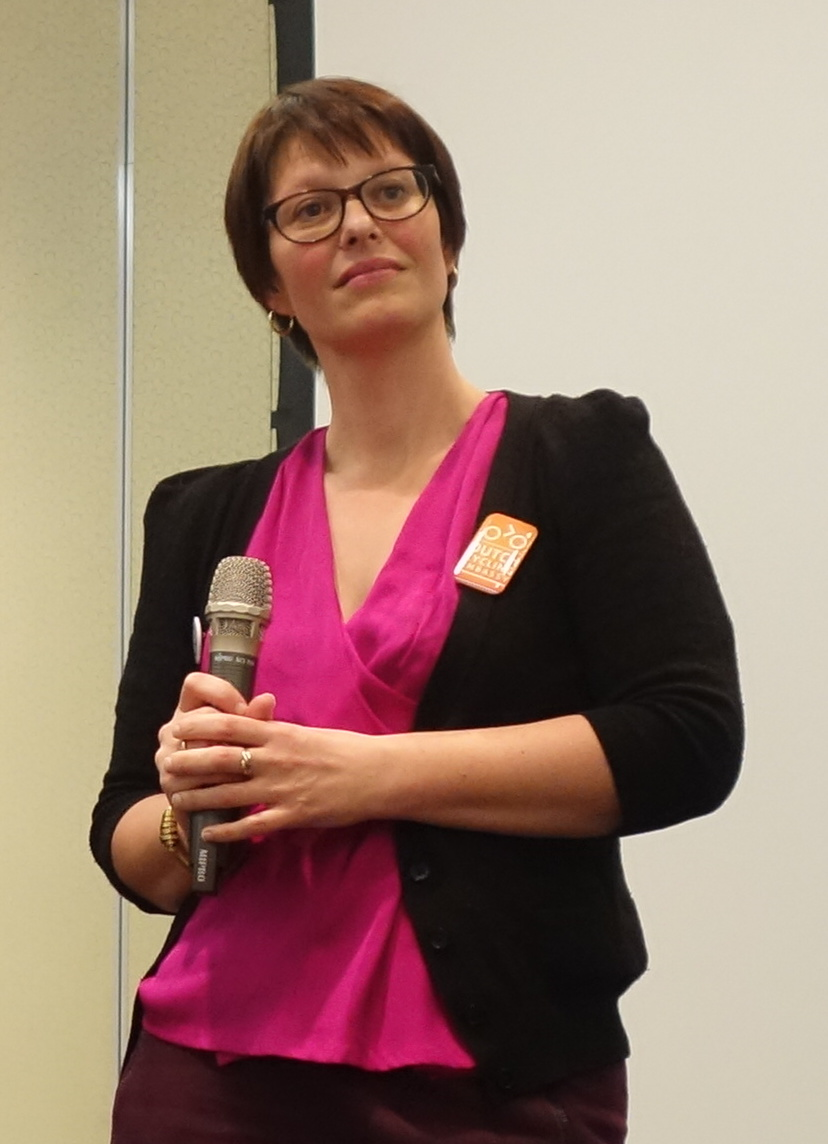
- Kluit in 2016

Member of the Senate
- Incumbent
- Assumed office 11 June 2019

Personal details
- Born: 26 May 1973 (age 53)
- Party: GroenLinks (until 2026); PRO (since 2026)

Saskia Kluit (born 26 May 1973) is a Dutch politician serving as a member of the Senate since 2019. From 2015 to 2020, she served as director of the Fietsersbond.
