= Nicki Pouw-Verweij =

Dutch politician (born 1991)

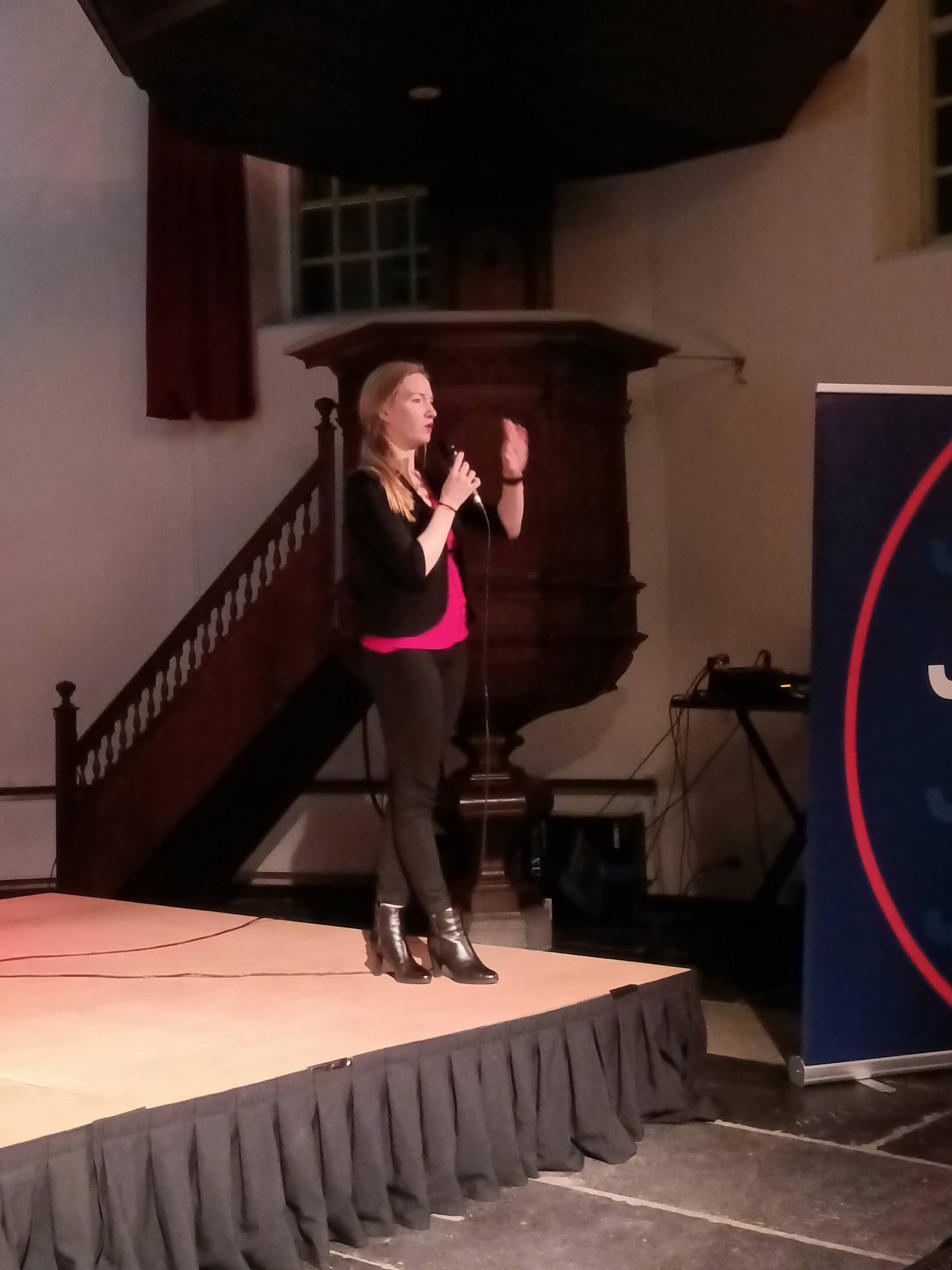
- Pouw-Verweij in 2023

State Secretary for Long-term and Social Care
- In office 19 June 2025 – 23 February 2026
- Prime Minister: Dick Schoof
- Minister: Daniëlle Jansen; Jan Anthonie Bruijn
- Preceded by: Vicky Maeijer

Member of the House of Representatives
- In office 31 March 2021 – 5 December 2023

Member of the Senate
- In office 13 November 2019 – 31 March 2021
- In office 11 June 2019 – 24 July 2019

Member of the Provincial Council of Utrecht
- In office 28 March 2019 – 14 April 2021

Personal details
- Born: Nicki Janna Francisca Pouw-Verweij; 21 May 1991 (age 35) IJsselstein, Netherlands
- Party: BBB (2023–present)
- Other political affiliations: FvD (2018–2020); JA21 (2020–2023)
- Children: 3
- Education: Vrije Universiteit Amsterdam (BSc, MSc, PhD)
- Occupation: Politician, physician

Nicki Janna Francisca Pouw-Verweij (born 21 May 1991) is a Dutch politician. She has served as member of the House of Representatives since March 2021.

Pouw-Verweij studied medicine at the Vrije Universiteit Amsterdam and was working on a PhD in rheumatology at the VU University Medical Center, which she achieved on 16 January 2023.

As a member of Forum for Democracy (FvD), Pouw-Verweij was elected to the Provincial Council of Utrecht in March 2019, and to the Senate in June 2019. She took maternity leave from the Senate from July to November 2019, and was replaced by Otto Hermans during this period. Pouw-Verweij left Forum for Democracy on 26 November 2020 because of controversial statements uttered by the party's leader Thierry Baudet. On 29 November, she formed the Van Pareren group (renamed the Nanninga group on 15 February 2021) along with four other former FvD Senators. The group became affiliated with the JA21 party on 24 December 2020.

In the 2021 general election, Pouw-Verweij was elected to the House of Representatives, receiving 16,302 preference votes. She took office on 31 March 2021, giving up her seat in the Senate, and resigning from the Provincial Council of Utrecht on 14 April. Her seat was temporarily held by Maarten Goudzwaard as she took maternity leave.

On 13 July 2023, Pouw-Verweij announced that she would not be a candidate for JA21 in the 2023 general election. On 1 September 2023, it was announced that she would be a candidate for the Farmer–Citizen Movement (BBB), joining its parliamentary group effective immediately.

On 19 June 2025, Pouw-Verweij was appointed State Secretary at the Ministry of Health, Welfare and Sport, with the portfolio of Long-term and Social Care. She succeeded Vicky Maeijer, who resigned when the PVV withdrew its support for the Schoof Cabinet.

== Electoral history ==
Electoral history of Nicki Pouw-Verweij
| Year | Body | Party | Pos. | Votes | Result | | Ref. |
| Year | Body | Party | Pos. | Votes | Party seats | Individual | Ref. |
|---|---|---|---|---|---|---|---|
| 2021 | House of Representatives | JA21 | 2 | 16,302 | 3 | Won | |
| 2023 | House of Representatives | Farmer–Citizen Movement | 9 | 2,469 | 7 | Lost | |
| 2025 | House of Representatives | Farmer–Citizen Movement | 50 (Note: Pouw-Verweij participated as her party's lijstduwer.) | 397 | 4 | Lost | |
