= Roel van Gurp =

Dutch politician

- Roel van Gurp in 2023

Member of the Senate
- Incumbent
- Assumed office 11 June 2019

Personal details
- Born: Roeland Johannes van Gurp; 22 September 1956 (age 70) Breda, Netherlands
- Party: GroenLinks (until 2026); PRO (from 2026)
- Children: 2
- Education: Catholic College Tilburg

Roeland Johannes "Roel" van Gurp (born 22 September 1956) is a Dutch politician. He has been a member of the Dutch Senate since 11 June 2019 representing GroenLinks until 2026, and Progressief Nederland after 2026.

== Early life ==
Roel van Gurp was born on 22 September 1956 in Breda. He began studying mathematics at Utrecht University, but dropped out after a year to study theology at the Catholic College Tilburg, today a part of Tilburg University. Van Gurp subsequently worked as an educational worker and youth worker in the late 1980s, before becoming a management teacher at a school for journalism from 1991 to 1994. From 2005 to 2011, Van Gurp was an executive leader of an organization dedicated to providing health care for young people, and from 2011 to 2023 he was director of a housing association in Waalwijk and Kaatsheuvel.

== Political career ==
In 1986, Van Gurp was first elected to the municipal council of Tilburg, which he would remain a member of until 2002. From 1994 to 2002, Van Gurp also served as alderman in Tilburg for GroenLinks, responsible for housing, environment, and neighborhood development.

Van Gurp became a member of the Senate for GroenLinks on 11 June 2019. As a senator, Van Gurp focuses on health, wellness, sports, and pensions, serving as his Senate group's spokesperson on a pension reform proposal in 2023. Since 2025, Van Gurp has chaired the Senate committee on social affairs.

For the 2023 Senate election, Van Gurp had initially been placed on the sixth spot on the GroenLinks electoral list, but had been dropped to the ninth place by a party congress in March to make place for younger candidates. This led to anger from the GroenLinks faction in the Provincial Council of North Brabant, who considered the list unrepresentative and the process by which it had been drawn up "undemocratic." Following that year's election, Van Gurp was elected into the Senate by preferential votes, which in turn led to several younger members and branches of GroenLinks's youth organization DWARS writing a protest letter to party leadership. That year, Van Gurp was the only member of his Senate group to vote against a proposal for a referendum.

== Personal life ==
Van Gurp is in a civil union, and has two children; a daughter and a son.
