= Peter Nicolaï =

Dutch lawyer and politician (born 1947)

Member of the Senate
- Incumbent
- Assumed office 11 June 2019

Personal details
- Born: Peterdick Nicolaï; 28 June 1947 (age 79) Amsterdam, Netherlands
- Party: Party for the Animals (until 2025)
- Spouse(s): Ineke Lodder (m. 1972; died 1982) Marynka Krylova (m. 1992, divorced)
- Children: Mia Nicolai
- Education: University of Amsterdam
- Occupation: Lawyer; politician

Peterdick "Peter" Nicolaï (born 28 June 1947) is a Dutch lawyer and politician. He has served as a member of the Senate since 11 June 2019.

== Early life and education ==
Nicolaï was born on 28 June 1947 in Amsterdam, North Holland. He attended the Spinoza Lyceum from 1959 to 1965, and studied law at the University of Amsterdam from 1965 to 1969. He received a doctorate from the University of Amsterdam in 1990.

== Career ==
In 1968, during his studies at the University of Amsterdam, Nicolaï started working as an assistant professor at the university's law faculty. He was later promoted to associate professor, which he remained until 2018. Between 1968 and 1975, he also worked as a freelance journalist for, among others, VPRO, Vrij Nederland and De Groene Amsterdammer.

Nicolaï has been active as a lawyer since 1985. Having specialised in administrative law, he has often proceeded against the Dutch government, representing various (environmental) activist groups. From 1989 to 2004, he worked as a professor of public law at the Open University of the Netherlands.

In the 2019 Senate election, Nicolaï was elected as a member of the Senate on behalf of the Party for the Animals. He was installed on 11 June 2019.

== Personal life ==
Nicolaï resides in Amsterdam and has four children: two sons from his marriage with Ineke Lodder (married 1972), and two daughters from his marriage with Marynka Krylova (married 1992). His youngest daughter is singer Mia Nicolai. He is currently married.
