= Paulien Geerdink =

Dutch politician (born 1969)

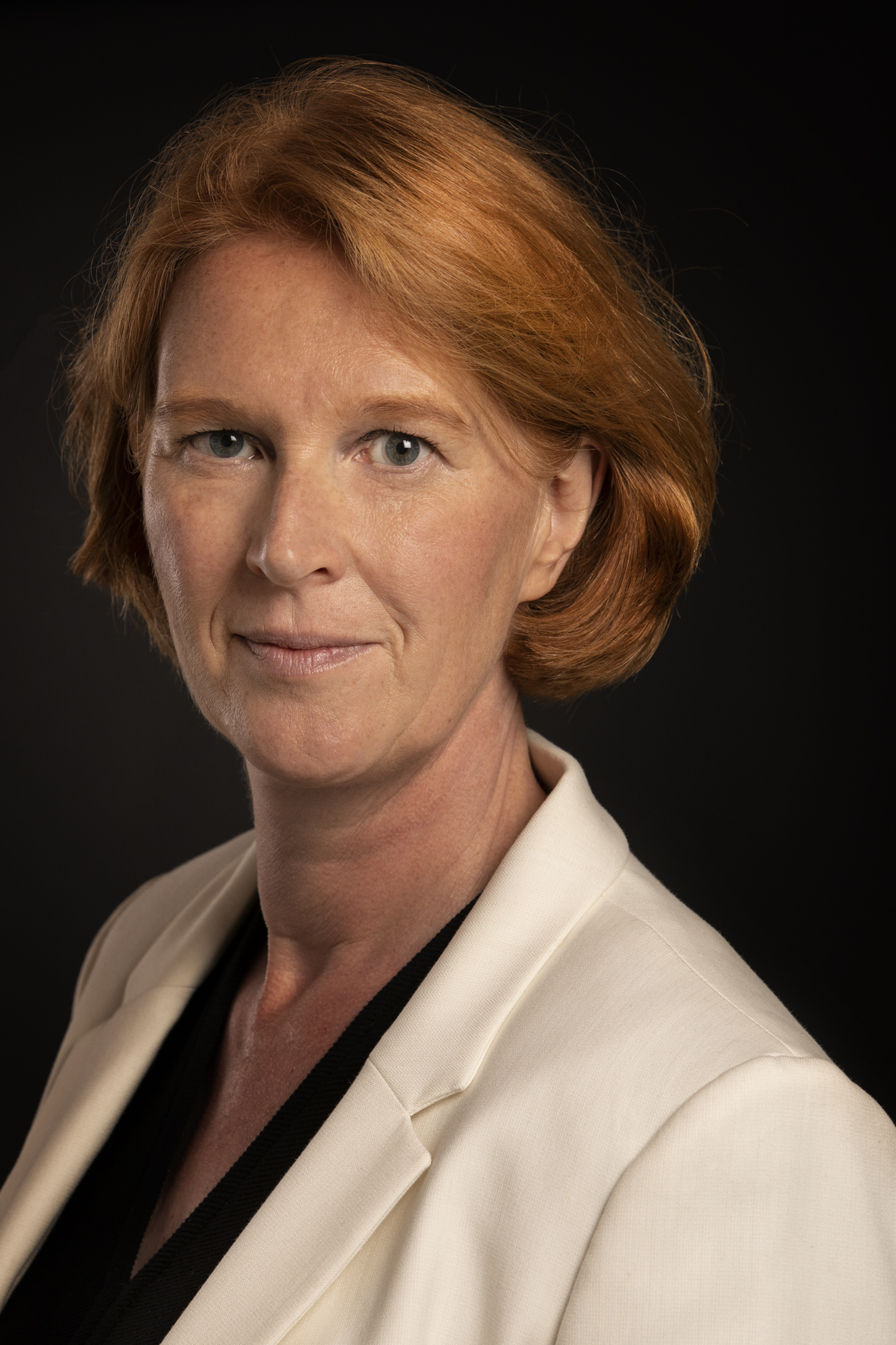

Member of the Senate
- Incumbent
- Assumed office 11 October 2023
- In office 11 June 2019 – 21 June 2023

Personal details
- Born: Paulien Willemien Geerdink; 7 March 1969 (age 56); Delft, Netherlands
- Political party: People's Party for Freedom and Democracy

Paulien Willemien Geerdink (born 7 March 1969) is a Dutch politician. She has served as a member of the Senate for the People's Party for Freedom and Democracy since October 2023, and earlier from 2019 to June 2023.
