= Kees Vendrik =

Dutch politician

Cornelis Constant Maria Vendrik
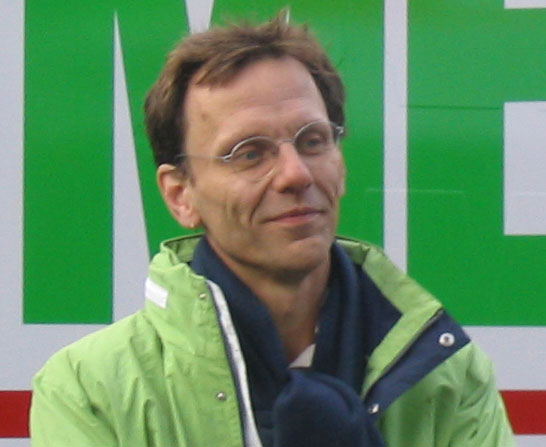

Member of the Netherlands Court of Audit
- Incumbent
- Assumed office 2011

Member of the House of Representatives
- In office 1998–2010

Personal details
- Born: 30 January 1963 (age 63) Nijmegen, Netherlands
- Party: GreenLeft

Cornelis Constant Maria (Kees) Vendrik (born 30 January 1963 in Nijmegen) is a member of the Netherlands Court of Audit.

== Before politics ==
Vendrik studied political science at the Radboud University Nijmegen and the University of Amsterdam. After his studies he worked for the debating centre De Balie in Amsterdam and as assistant of GreenLeft parliamentary party in the House of Representatives.

== Political life ==
Vendrik was a member of the House of Representatives for GreenLeft. He used to be the party's specialist on the economy, finance, the health care system and international trade. He is an advocate of the use of open source software by government agencies.

He was a member of the State Committee on Rule of Law, established by the cabinet, parliament, and judicial branch in response to political scandals that harmed public trust such as the childcare benefits scandal, induced earthquakes in Groningen due to gas extraction, and the nitrogen crisis. It concluded in June 2024 that trust in the government had been damaged by a neglect of the rule of law and by overly-complicated rules and procedures.
