= List of People's Party for Freedom and Democracy senators =

This is a list of members of the Senate of the Netherlands for the People's Party for Freedom and Democracy (VVD).

== List ==
Member	Start date	End date	Ref.
Gijs van Aardenne	13 June 1995	10 August 1995	
Micky Adriaansens	11 June 2019	10 January 2022	
Alfred Arbouw	11 June 2019	12 June 2023	
Edward Asscher	12 June 2007	6 June 2011	
Jan Baas	8 November 1960	9 June 1981	
Pim van Ballekom	11 June 2019		
Henk Beckers	7 June 2011	8 June 2015	
Pol de Beer	10 January 1995	12 June 1995	
Pol de Beer	5 September 1995	9 June 2003	
Caspar van den Berg	18 January 2022	16 September 2024	
Sidney J. van den Bergh	17 September 1963	9 May 1971	
Steven Bierema	27 July 1948	14 February 1950	
Marbeth Bierman-Beukema toe Water	8 June 1999	11 June 2007	
Ger Biermans	10 June 2003	6 June 2011	
Mirjam de Blécourt	11 June 2019	12 June 2023	
Cobi de Blécourt-Maas	18 April 2000	9 June 2003	
Ton van Boven	3 June 1980	9 June 1981	
Ton van Boven	30 November 1982	12 June 1995	
Ted Braakman	23 June 1987	10 June 1991	
Willem Bröcker	7 June 2011	8 June 2015	
Nicoline van den Broek-Laman Trip	7 September 1993	11 June 2007	
Ankie Broekers-Knol	2 October 2001	10 June 2019	
Jan Anthonie Bruijn	6 November 2012	5 September 2025	
Reina de Bruijn-Wezeman	21 March 2017	12 June 2023	
Eric van der Burg	11 June 2019	10 January 2022	
Marten Burkens	13 September 1983	22 June 1987	
Dick Dees	23 June 1995	11 June 2007	
Daniël Delprat	18 March 1958	15 September 1969	
Heleen Dupuis	8 June 1999	8 June 2015	
Anne-Wil Duthler	12 June 2007	26 April 2019 (Note: She continued as an independent politician until 10 June 2019 after being expelled from the parliamentary group.)	
Wim van Eekelen	13 June 1995	9 June 2003	
Frans Feij	17 September 1974	22 June 1987	
Paulien Geerdink	11 June 2019	20 June 2023	
Paulien Geerdink	11 October 2023	30 June 2025	
Molly Geertsema	13 September 1983	22 June 1987	
Leendert Ginjaar	25 August 1981	9 June 2003	
Fred de Graaf	10 June 2003	8 June 2015	
John van Graafeiland	13 September 1983	2 June 1986	
John van Graafeiland	23 June 1987	7 June 1999	
Frank de Grave	7 June 2011	2 September 2018	
Geert de Grooth	6 November 1956	28 February 1958	
Robert de Haze Winkelman	13 June 1995	7 June 1999	
Han Heijmans	22 June 1982	7 June 1999	
Henk Heijne Makkreel	29 March 1977	7 June 1999	
Guus van Hemert tot Dingshof	25 September 1973	9 June 1981	
Loek Hermans	12 June 2007	2 November 2015	
Jan van Heukelum	13 June 1995	11 June 2007	
Lammert Hilarides	11 June 1991	5 April 2000	
Willem Hoekzema	10 June 2003	11 June 2007	
Bart Hofman	21 September 1982	22 June 1987	
Pieter Hofstra	12 June 2007	6 June 2011	
Helmi Huijbregts-Schiedon	12 June 2007	10 June 2019	
Ad de Jager	13 June 1995	7 June 1999	
Ad de Jager	11 April 2000	9 June 2003	
Gerbrand de Jong	17 September 1974	9 June 1981	
Annemarie Jorritsma	9 June 2015	12 June 2023	
Marian Kaljouw	13 June 2023		
Elsabe Kalsbeek-Schimmelpenninck van der Oije	10 June 2003	11 June 2007	
Frank van Kappen	12 June 2007	10 June 2019	
Niek Ketting	13 June 1995	11 June 2007	
Jan Keunen	26 October 2020	12 June 2023	
Tanja Klip-Martin	12 July 2016		
Liesbeth Kneppers-Heijnert	8 June 1999	9 June 2003	
Liesbeth Kneppers-Heijnert	12 June 2007	8 June 2015	
Menno Knip	26 October 2010	10 June 2019	
Frits Korthals Altes	10 June 1981	3 November 1982	
Frits Korthals Altes	11 June 1991	1 October 2001	
Hans de Koster	20 September 1977	15 May 1980	
Pauline Krikke	9 June 2015	15 March 2017	
Dian van Leeuwen-Schut	11 June 1991	31 December 1994	
Marjolein van der Linden	14 January 2025		
Michel Lodewijks	13 June 1995	7 June 1999	
Aarnout Loudon	13 June 1995	7 June 1999	
Hendrik Louwes	5 June 1963	31 August 1979	
Herman Louwes	7 March 1950	8 October 1960	
Paul Luijten	13 June 1995	11 June 2007	
David Luteijn	13 September 1983	12 June 1995	
Henk Jan Meijer	11 June 2019		
Anthonie Molenaar	28 January 1948 (Note: He had served as a senator on behalf of the Freedom Party since 23 July 1946.)	21 November 1958	
Shirin Musa	23 September 2025		
Cees van den Oosten	10 June 2003	11 June 2007	
Arie Pais	20 September 1977	18 December 1977	
Arie Pais	25 August 1981	15 June 1982	
Koen Petersen	13 June 2023		
Carel Polak	11 May 1971	28 March 1977	
Minus Polak	15 June 1976	19 September 1977	
Jaap Rensema	13 June 1995	9 June 2003	
Jos van Rey	7 June 2011	22 October 2012	
Harm van Riel	6 November 1956	4 June 1963	
Harm van Riel	2 July 1963	2 June 1976	
Fransje Roscam Abbing-Bos	13 June 1995	9 June 2003	
Uri Rosenthal	8 June 1999	14 October 2010	
Cees van de Sanden	27 June 2023	10 October 2023	
Cees van de Sanden	24 September 2024	8 October 2025 (Note: Continued as an independent)	
Sybe Schaap	12 June 2007	10 June 2019	
Edith Schippers	20 June 2023	13 January 2025	
Johan Schlingemann	17 September 1974	15 September 1980	
Johan Schlingemann	2 December 1980	9 June 1981	
Koos Schouwenaar	7 June 2011	10 June 2019	
Jo Schouwenaar-Franssen	6 November 1956	23 July 1963	
Jo Schouwenaar-Franssen	20 September 1966	9 May 1971	
Haya van Someren	17 September 1974	12 November 1980	
Dirk Stikker	28 January 1948 (Note: He had served as a senator on behalf of the Freedom Party since 20 November 1945.)	7 August 1948	
Karin Straus	1 July 2025		
Tom Struick van Bemmelen	13 September 1983	22 June 1987	
Ben Swagerman	7 June 2011	8 June 2015	
Ben Swagerman	10 November 2015	11 July 2016	
Paula Swenker	8 June 1999	6 June 2011	
Henk Talsma	23 June 1987	7 June 1999	
Govert van Tets	20 September 1977	22 June 1987	
Marius Varekamp	13 June 1995	9 June 2003	
Els Veder-Smit	25 August 1981	10 June 1991	
Tom Veen	18 September 1979	12 September 1983	
Mart van de Ven	9 June 2015	10 June 2019	
Jan Verbeek	13 September 1983	7 June 1999	
Piet Gerard van de Vliet	20 September 1960	9 May 1971	
Rian Vogels	13 June 2023		
Loes Vonhoff-Luijendijk	24 January 1978	10 June 1991	
Lucas Vos	18 January 2022	12 June 2023	
Reint de Vos van Steenwijk	18 September 1951	4 June 1963	
Jan Voûte	24 February 1976	15 September 1980	
Willem Wendelaar	25 August 1948	5 November 1956	
Ym van der Werff	16 September 1969	18 June 1993	
Roel Wever	11 September 2018	15 October 2020	
Jan Kees Wiebenga	20 September 1977	15 September 1982	
Hans Wiegel	13 June 1995	31 March 2000	
Bob de Wilde	6 November 1956	4 June 1963	
Bob de Wilde	9 July 1963	16 September 1974	
Bob de Wilde	29 October 1974	31 January 1976	
Johan Witteveen	23 December 1958	4 June 1963	
Johan Witteveen	8 June 1971	31 August 1973	
Roelof Zegering Hadders	28 January 1948	26 July 1948	
Guus Zoutendijk	11 May 1971	22 June 1987	
