= Borrie =

Borrie can refer to:

== People ==
- Bob Borrie (1926–1999), Canadian politician in BC
- Gilles Borrie (1925–2016), Dutch politician and historian
- Gordon Borrie, Baron Borrie (1931–2016), English politician and peer
- W. D. Borrie (1913–2000), New Zealand demographer and academic

== Other ==
- Borrie Church, medieval church in Scania, Sweden
- Lake Borrie Wetlands, coastal wetland in Geelong, Australia
