= Jos van Kemenade =

Dutch politician (1937–2020)

His Excellency Jos van Kemenade
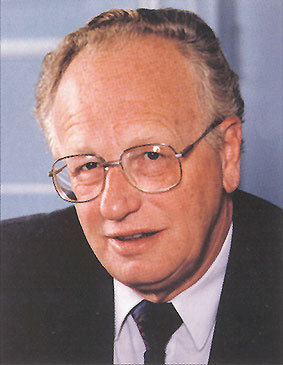
- Van Kemenade in 2002

Queen's Commissioner of North Holland
- In office 1 May 1992 – 1 April 2002
- Monarch: Beatrix
- Preceded by: Roel de Wit
- Succeeded by: Harry Borghouts

Mayor of Eindhoven
- In office 1 March 1988 – 1 May 1992
- Preceded by: Gilles Borrie
- Succeeded by: Rein Welschen

Member of the House of Representatives
- In office 16 September 1982 – 1 September 1984
- In office 16 January 1978 – 11 September 1981
- In office 8 June 1977 – 8 September 1977
- Parliamentary group: Labour Party

Minister of Education and Sciences
- In office 11 September 1981 – 29 May 1982
- Prime Minister: Dries van Agt
- Preceded by: Arie Pais
- Succeeded by: Wim Deetman
- In office 11 May 1973 – 19 December 1977
- Prime Minister: Joop den Uyl
- Preceded by: Chris van Veen
- Succeeded by: Arie Pais

Personal details
- Born: Josephus Antonius van Kemenade; 6 March 1937 Amsterdam, Netherlands
- Died: 19 February 2020 (aged 82) Heiloo, Netherlands
- Party: Labour Party (from 1958)
- Spouse: Anny Nijman (m. 1965; died 2016)
- Children: Anna van Kemenade; Ferd-Jan van Kemenade; Pieter van Kemenade; Joran van Kemenade
- Education: Radboud University Nijmegen (Bachelor of Social Science, Master of Social Science, Doctor of Philosophy)
- Occupation: Politician · Civil servant · Sociologist · Pedagogue · Researcher · Nonprofit director · Academic administrator · Editor · Author · Professor

Josephus Antonius van Kemenade (6 March 1937 – 19 February 2020) was a Dutch politician of the Labour Party (PvdA) and sociologist. He was granted the honorary title of Minister of State on 5 April 2002.

== Life and career ==
Van Kemenade was born in Amsterdam. He attended a Gymnasium in Amsterdam from June 1949 until 1955 and applied at the Radboud University Nijmegen in June 1955 majoring in Sociology and obtaining a Bachelor of Social Science degree in June 1957 and worked as a student researcher before graduating with a Master of Social Science degree in May 1960. Van Kemenade worked as a researcher at the Radboud University Nijmegen from May 1960 until January 1965 and was director of the ITS Nijmegen from 1 January 1965 until 11 May 1973. Van Kemenade returned to the Radboud University Nijmegen in July 1964 for a postgraduate education in sociology where he got a doctorate as a Doctor of Philosophy in sociology on 10 May 1968. Van Kemenade worked as a professor of pedagogy at the Radboud University Nijmegen from 1 January 1970 until 11 May 1973.

After the election of 1972 Van Kemenade was appointed as minister of education and sciences in the Cabinet Den Uyl, taking office on 11 May 1973. The Cabinet Den Uyl fell on 22 March 1977 and continued to serve in a demissionary capacity. Van Kemenade was elected as a Member of the House of Representatives after the election of 1977, taking office on 8 June 1977 but he was still serving in the cabinet, and because of dualism customs in the constitutional convention of Dutch politics, he couldn't serve a dual mandate so he subsequently resigned as a Member of the House of Representatives on 8 September 1977. The Cabinet Den Uyl was replaced by the Cabinet Van Agt–Wiegel following the cabinet formation of 1977 on 11 May 1973 and he subsequently returned as Member of the House of Representatives after the resignation of Frits Niessen, taking office on 16 January 1978 serving as a frontbencher and spokesperson for Education, Science and Technology. Van Kemenade also returned as a distinguished professor of Pedagogy at the University of Groningen from 1 May 1978 until 11 September 1981. After the election of 1981 Van Kemenade was again appointed as Minister of Education and Sciences in the Cabinet Van Agt II, taking office on 11 September 1981. The Cabinet Van Agt II fell just seven months into its term on 12 May 1982 and continued to serve in a demissionary capacity until it was replaced by the caretaker Cabinet Van Agt III on 29 May 1982. After the election of 1982 Van Kemenade again returned as a Member of the House of Representatives, taking office on 16 September 1982 serving as a frontbencher chairing the parliamentary committee on Education and Science and the parliamentary committee on Kingdom Relations. Van Kemenade also returned as a distinguished professor of Pedagogy at the University of Amsterdam from 1 July 1982 until 1 September 1984.

In September 1984 Van Kemenade was nominated as the president of the university council of the University of Amsterdam, he resigned as a Member of the House of Representatives the same day he was installed as president of the university council on 1 September 1984. Van Kemenade also served as a distinguished professor of pedagogy at the Open University from 1 February 1987 until 1 February 1995. In February 1988 Van Kemenade was nominated as Mayor of Eindhoven, he resigned as president of the university council the same day he was installed as mayor, taking office on 1 March 1988. In February 1992 Van Kemenade was nominated as the Queen's Commissioner of North Holland, he resigned as mayor the same day he was installed as Queen's Commissioner, serving from 1 May 1992 until 1 April 2002. Van Kemenade also became active in the public sector and occupied numerous seats as a nonprofit director on several boards of directors and supervisory boards (Institute for Multiparty Democracy, Organisation for Scientific Research, Transnational Institute, Parliamentary Documentation Center, International Institute of Social History, ProDemos, Foundation for Academic Heritage, International Society for Comparative Adult Education, T.M.C. Asser Instituut, Anne Frank Foundation, and the Royal Academy of Arts and Sciences) and served on several state commissions and councils on behalf of the government (Raad voor het Openbaar Bestuur, Public Pension Funds APB, Raad voor Cultuur and the Cadastre Agency. Van Kemenade also served as a distinguished visiting professor of sociology at the University of Amsterdam from 1 March 2000 until 1 May 2002. Van Kemenade was also a prolific author, having written more than a dozen books since 1970 about politics and education.

Van Kemenade was known for his abilities as a consensus builder and policy wonk. Van Kemenade died on 19 February 2020. He continued to comment on political affairs as a statesman until his death.

== Decorations ==
Honours
Ribbon bar	Honour	Country	Date	Comment
	Knight of the Order of the Holy Sepulchre	Holy See	30 November 1973	
	Grand Cross of the Order of Leopold II	Belgium	1 August 1975	
	Knight Commander of the Order of Merit	Germany	10 December 1975	
	Grand Officer of the Legion of Honour	France	28 February 1976	
	Grand Cross of the Order of the Oak Crown	Luxembourg	19 August 1977	
	Knight Grand Cross of the Order of Isabella the Catholic	Spain	8 March 1982	
	Commander of the Order of Orange-Nassau	Netherlands	9 September 1982	
	Knight Commander with Star of the Order of St. Gregory the Great	Holy See	21 March 1996	
	Commander of the Order of the Netherlands Lion	Netherlands	5 April 2002	Elevated from Knight (11 April 1978)
Honorific Titles
Ribbon bar	Honour	Country	Date	Comment
	Minister of State	Netherlands	5 April 2002	Style of Excellency

Political offices
Preceded by Chris van Veen	Minister of Education and Sciences; 1973–1977; 1981–1982	Succeeded by Arie Pais
Preceded by Arie Pais	Minister of Education and Sciences; 1973–1977; 1981–1982	Succeeded by Wim Deetman
Preceded by Gilles Borrie	Mayor of Eindhoven; 1988–1992	Succeeded by Rein Welschen
Preceded by Roel de Wit	Queen's Commissioner of North Holland; 1992–2002	Succeeded by Harry Borghouts
Civic offices
Preceded by Harm Bruins Slot	Chairman of the Supervisory board of the Raad voor het Openbaar Bestuur; 2001–2009	Succeeded by Jacques Wallage
Non-profit organization positions
Preceded by Office established	Chairman of the Supervisory board of the Institute for Multiparty Democracy; 2000–2007	Succeeded by Ben Bot
Academic offices
Unknown	Vice President of the University council of the Radboud University Nijmegen; 1972–1973	Unknown
Unknown	President of the University council of the University of Amsterdam; 1984–1988	Unknown
