= Eegje Schoo =

Dutch politician and diplomat

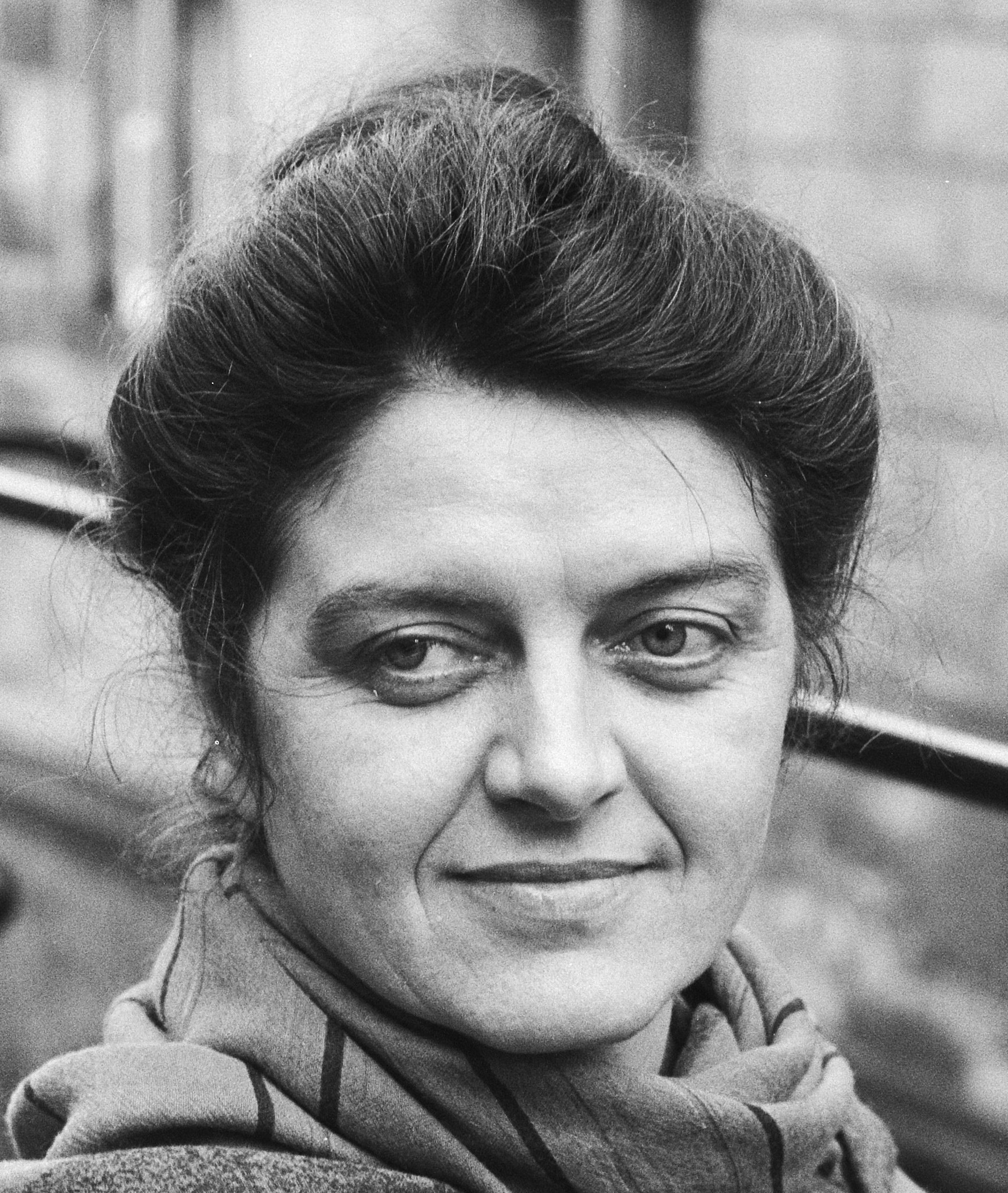
- Schoo in 1982

Ambassador of the Netherlands to India
- In office 1 June 1987 – 1 January 1991
- Preceded by: Unknown
- Succeeded by: Unknown

Member of the House of Representatives
- In office 3 June 1986 – 20 January 1987
- Parliamentary group: People's Party for Freedom and Democracy

Minister for Development Cooperation
- In office 4 November 1982 – 14 July 1986
- Prime Minister: Ruud Lubbers
- Preceded by: Kees van Dijk
- Succeeded by: Piet Bukman

Personal details
- Born: Eegje Marjolein Schoo; 10 June 1944 (age 82) Amsterdam, Netherlands
- Party: People's Party for Freedom and Democracy (from 1972)
- Spouse: Arie Pais (m. 1970)
- Education: University of Amsterdam (Bachelor of Social Science, Master of Social Science)
- Occupation: Politician · Diplomat · Civil servant · Businesswoman · Corporate director · Nonprofit director · Management consultant · Teacher · Lobbyist

Eegje Marjolein Schoo (born 10 June 1944) is a retired Dutch politician and diplomat of the People's Party for Freedom and Democracy (VVD).

== Career ==
Schoo served as Minister for Development Cooperation from 4 November 1982 until 14 July 1986 in the Cabinet Lubbers I and as a Member of the House of Representatives from 3 June 1986 until 20 January 1987. She served as the Netherlands Ambassador of the Netherlands to India from 1 June 1987 until 1 January 1991. From 2002 to 2006, Schoo was a member of the permanent committee on Development Cooperation of the A.I.V. (Advisory Council on International Affairs).

In 2021, Schoo donated over a hundred works by contemporary Indian artists to Museum Arnhem.

== Personal life ==
Schoo was married to fellow politician Arie Pais from 1970 until his death in 2022.

== Decorations ==
Honours
Ribbon bar	Honour	Country	Date	Comment
	Knight of the Order of the Netherlands Lion	Netherlands	26 August 1986	
	Commander of the Order of Orange-Nassau	Netherlands	30 April 1991	

Civic offices
Unknown	Chairwoman of the Emancipation Council; 1981–1982	Unknown
Political offices
Preceded by Kees van Dijk	Minister for Development Cooperation; 1982–1986	Succeeded by Piet Bukman
Diplomatic posts
Unknown	Ambassador of the Netherlands to India; 1987–1991	Unknown
