= Frits Korthals Altes =

Dutch politician (1931–2025)

His Excellency Frits Korthals Altes
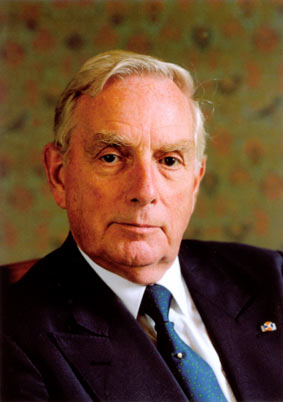
- Korthals Altes in 2001

President of the Senate
- In office 11 March 1997 – 2 October 2001
- Preceded by: Herman Tjeenk Willink
- Succeeded by: Gerrit Braks

Parliamentary leader in the Senate
- In office 13 June 1995 – 11 March 1997
- Preceded by: David Luteijn
- Succeeded by: Leendert Ginjaar
- Parliamentary group: People's Party for Freedom and Democracy

Member of the House of Representatives
- In office 14 September 1989 – 11 June 1991

Minister of the Interior
- In office 26 January 1987 – 3 February 1987; Ad interim
- Prime Minister: Ruud Lubbers
- Preceded by: Kees van Dijk
- Succeeded by: Jan de Koning (Ad interim)
- In office 20 February 1986 – 12 March 1986; Ad interim
- Prime Minister: Ruud Lubbers
- Preceded by: Koos Rietkerk
- Succeeded by: Rudolf de Korte

Minister of Justice
- In office 4 November 1982 – 7 November 1989
- Prime Minister: Ruud Lubbers
- Preceded by: Job de Ruiter
- Succeeded by: Ernst Hirsch Ballin

Member of the Senate
- In office 11 June 1991 – 2 October 2001
- In office 10 June 1981 – 4 November 1982

Chairman of the People's Party for Freedom and Democracy
- In office 15 March 1975 – 22 May 1981
- Leader: Hans Wiegel
- Preceded by: Haya van Someren
- Succeeded by: Jan Kamminga

Personal details
- Born: Frederik Korthals Altes; 15 May 1931 Amsterdam, Netherlands
- Died: 19 February 2025 (aged 93)
- Party: People's Party for Freedom and Democracy (from 1956)
- Spouses: Titia Kist (m. 1965; div. 1985) Hendrika Matthijssen (m. 1985)
- Children: 3 sons
- Education: Leiden University (Bachelor of Laws, Master of Laws)
- Occupation: Politician · Jurist · Lawyer · Corporate director · Nonprofit director · Editor · Author

Frederik "Frits" Korthals Altes (15 May 1931 – 19 February 2025) was a Dutch politician of the People's Party for Freedom and Democracy (VVD) and jurist. He was granted the honorary title of Minister of State on 26 October 2001.

== Background ==
Korthals Altes attended the Barlaeus Gymnasium in Amsterdam from June 1937 until July 1943 and applied at the Leiden University in June 1951 majoring in Law and obtaining a Bachelor of Laws degree in June 1953 before graduating with a Master of Laws degree in July 1957. Korthals Altes worked as a lawyer in Rotterdam from August 1957 until November 1982.

Korthals Altes died on 19 February 2025, at the age of 93.

== Political career ==
Korthals Altes served as Chairman of the People's Party for Freedom and Democracy from 15 March 1975 until 22 May 1981. Korthals Altes was elected to the Senate after the 1981 Senate election, taking office on 10 June 1981. After the 1982 general election, Korthals Altes was appointed Minister of Justice in the Lubbers I cabinet, taking office on 4 November 1982. Korthals Altes also served as acting Minister of the Interior from 20 February 1986 until 12 March 1986 following the death of Koos Rietkerk. After the 1986 general election, Korthals Altes continued as Minister of Justice in the Lubbers II cabinet, taking office on 14 July 1986. Korthals Altes again served as acting Minister of the Interior from 26 January 1987 until 3 February 1987 during a medical leave of absence of Kees van Dijk until Minister of Social Affairs and Employment Jan de Koning took over as acting Minister of the Interior. Korthals Altes was elected to the House of Representatives in the 1989 general election, taking office on 14 September 1989. The Lubbers II cabinet was replaced by the Lubbers III cabinet on 7 November 1989, and he continued to serve in the House of Representatives as a frontbencher.

In April 1991 Korthals Altes announced that he wanted to return to the Senate. In the 1991 Senate election, Korthals Altes was elected again to the Senate; he resigned from the House of Representatives upon his installation as a member of the Senate on 11 June 1991, and served as a frontbencher chairing several parliamentary committees. Korthals Altes also became active in the private and public sectors, occupying numerous seats as a corporate director and nonprofit director on boards of directors and supervisory boards (Unilever, KPN, Randstad NV, Arcadis, Carnegie Foundation, Stichting INGKA Foundation, and the Institute of International Relations Clingendael), and serving on several state commissions and councils on behalf of the government. Following the 1991 Senate election, Korthals Altes was selected as parliamentary leader of the People's Party for Freedom and Democracy in the Senate, taking office on 13 June 1995. Korthals Altes was nominated as President of the Senate following the appointment of Herman Tjeenk Willink as Vice-President of the Council of State, taking office on 11 March 1997. In September 2001, Korthals Altes announced his retirement from national politics. He resigned as President of the Senate and a member of the Senate on 2 October 2001.

With his resignation from the senate in 2001, he was nominated as Minister of State. Earlier in 1997, the VVD gave him an honorary membership. The Dutch Queen nominated Korthals Altes, alongside Rein Jan Hoekstra (CDA), as informateur, after a first round of talks between the CDA and Labour Party (PvdA) to form a new cabinet failed. The second Balkenende cabinet between the VVD, CDA and D66, was installed in May 2003.

Korthals Altes chaired a commission in 2007 that looked into the Dutch election process. The final report of the commission advised the government to abandon electronic voting machines, as they lack a paper trail.

== Honours and appointments ==
=== Appointments ===
- Netherlands: Minister of State with style of Excellency (26 October 2001)

=== National ===
- Commander of the Order of Orange-Nassau (20 November 1989)
- Officer of the Order of Orange-Nassau (13 May 1981)

=== Foreign ===
- Belgium: Grand Cross of the Order of the Crown (6 July 1986)
- France:
  - Grand Cross of the National Order of Merit (28 February 2000)
  - Grand Officer of the Order of Legion of Honour (6 February 1984)
- Germany: Grand Cross 1st Class of the Order of Merit of the Federal Republic of Germany (30 May 1985)
- Japan: Grand Cordon of the Order of the Sacred Treasure (12 May 2000)
- Luxembourg: Grand Cross of the Order of the Oak Crown (15 November 1983)
- Portugal: Grand Cross of the Order of Merit (2 October 1989)
- Spain: Knight Grand Cross of the Order of Isabella the Catholic (1 December 1998)

=== Other memberships ===
- Netherlands: Honorary Member of the People's Party for Freedom and Democracy (23 May 1997)

Party political offices
| Preceded by Haya van Someren | Chairman of the People's Party for Freedom and Democracy; 1975–1981 | Succeeded by Jan Kamminga |
| Preceded by David Luteijn | Parliamentary leader of the People's Party for Freedom and Democracy in the Senate; 1995–1997 | Succeeded by Leendert Ginjaar |
Political offices
| Preceded by Job de Ruiter | Minister of Justice; 1982–1989 | Succeeded by Ernst Hirsch Ballin |
| Preceded by Koos Rietkerk | Minister of the Interior; Ad interim 1986; 1987 | Succeeded by Rudolf de Korte |
| Preceded by Kees van Dijk | Minister of the Interior; Ad interim 1986; 1987 | Succeeded by Jan de Koning; Ad interim |
| Preceded by Herman Tjeenk Willink | President of the Senate; 1997–2001 | Succeeded by Gerrit Braks |
