= Kees van Dijk =

Dutch politician (1931–2008)

His Excellency Kees van Dijk
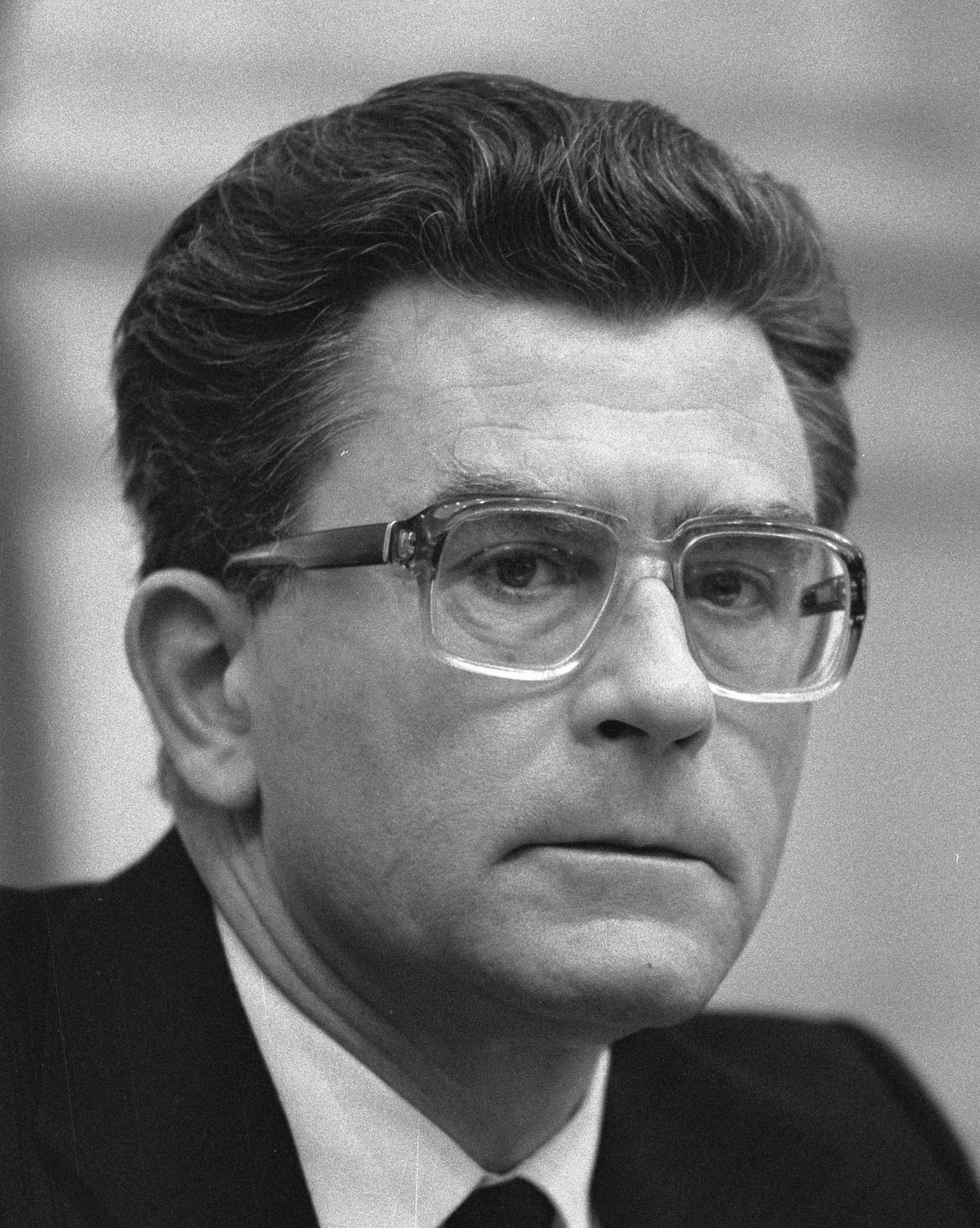
- Kees van Dijk in 1981

Member of the Scientific Council for Government Policy
- In office 1 November 1999 – 15 December 2003
- Director: Michiel Scheltema

Member of the Senate
- In office 11 June 1991 – 8 June 1999
- Parliamentary group: Christian Democratic Appeal

Minister of the Interior
- In office 6 May 1987 – 7 November 1989
- Prime Minister: Ruud Lubbers
- Preceded by: Jan de Koning (Ad interim)
- Succeeded by: Ien Dales
- In office 14 July 1986 – 26 January 1987
- Prime Minister: Ruud Lubbers
- Preceded by: Rudolf de Korte
- Succeeded by: Frits Korthals Altes (Ad interim)

Minister for Development Cooperation
- In office 11 September 1981 – 4 November 1982
- Prime Minister: Dries van Agt
- Preceded by: Jan de Koning
- Succeeded by: Eegje Schoo

Member of the House of Representatives
- In office 16 September 1982 – 14 July 1986
- In office 8 June 1977 – 11 September 1981
- Parliamentary group: Christian Democratic Appeal (1980–1981); Christian Historical Union (1977–1980)

Personal details
- Born: Cornelis Pieter van Dijk; 25 July 1931 Rotterdam, Netherlands
- Died: 29 December 2008 (aged 77) Rotterdam, Netherlands
- Party: Christian Democratic Appeal (from 1980)
- Other political affiliations: Christian Historical Union (1973–1980)
- Spouse: Catharina Smit (m. 1957)
- Education: Erasmus University Rotterdam (Bachelor of Economics, Master of Economics)
- Occupation: Politician · Civil servant · Economist · Researcher · Businessman · Banker · Financial analyst · Accountant · Corporate director · Nonprofit director · Teacher

Cornelis Pieter "Kees" van Dijk (25 July 1931 – 29 December 2008) was a Dutch politician of the Christian Historical Union (CHU) party and later the Christian Democratic Appeal (CDA) party and economist.

Van Dijk worked as student researcher at the Erasmus University Rotterdam from June 1954 until July 1956. Van Dijk worked as an accountant at a bank in Johannesburg from July 1956 until April 1961 and as a civil servant for the Ministry of Foreign Affairs as an attaché in the Netherlands New Guinea from April 1961 until October 1962. Van Dijk worked as a financial analyst for the Organisation for Economic Co-operation and Development (OECD) in Paris from October 1962 until February 1968 and the World Bank in Washington, D.C. from February 1968 until June 1977. Van Dijk also worked as a teacher for the intelligence and security agency Domestic Security Service (BVD) from August 1963 until December 1967. Van Dijk was elected as a Member of the House of Representatives after the election of 1977, taking office on 8 June 1977. After the election of 1981 Van Dijk was appointed as Minister for Development Cooperation in the Cabinet Van Agt II, taking office on 11 September 1981. The Cabinet Van Agt II fell just seven months into its term on 12 May 1982 and continued to serve in a demissionary capacity until it was replaced by the caretaker Cabinet Van Agt III with Van Dijk continuing as Minister for Development Cooperation, taking office on 29 May 1982. After the election of 1982 Van Dijk returned as a Member of the House of Representatives, taking office on 16 September 1982. Following the cabinet formation of 1982 Van Dijk was not giving a ministerial post in the new cabinet and the Cabinet Van Agt III was replaced by the Cabinet Lubbers I on 4 November 1982. After the election of 1986 Van Dijk was appointed as Minister of the Interior in the Cabinet Lubbers II, taking office on 14 July 1986. Van Dijk took a medical leave of absence from 26 January 1987 until 6 May 1987 during which Minister of Justice Frits Korthals Altes served as acting Minister of the Interior from 26 January 1987 until 3 February 1987 followed by Minister of Social Affairs and Employment Jan de Koning from 3 February 1987 until 6 May 1987. In April 1989 Van Dijk announced that he would not stand for the election of 1989.

Van Dijk remained in active politics, he was elected as a Member of the Senate after the Senate election of 1991, serving from 11 June 1991 until 8 June 1999. Van Dijk also became active in the private sector and public sector and occupied numerous seats as a corporate director and nonprofit director on several boards of directors and supervisory boards (Douwe Egberts, Netherlands Economic Institute, Edmund Burke Foundation, Stichting Pensioenfonds Zorg en Welzijn, International Statistical Institute, European Cultural Foundation and Smit International) and served on several state commissions and councils on behalf of the government (Scientific Council for Government Policy, Advisory Council for Spatial Planning and the Netherlands Foreign Investment Agency).

Van Dijk was known for his abilities as a debater and manager. Van Dijk continued to comment on political affairs until his death.

== Decorations ==
Honours
Ribbon bar	Honour	Country	Date	Comment
	Grand Officer of the Order of Leopold II	Belgium	12 February 1982	
	Knight Commander of the Order of Merit	Germany	12 September 1988	
	Commander of the Legion of Honour	France	10 March 1989	
	Grand Officer of the Order of Orange-Nassau	Netherlands	20 November 1989	Elevated from Officer (9 December 1982)
	Knight of the Order of the Netherlands Lion	Netherlands	8 June 1999	

Political offices
Preceded by Jan de Koning	Minister for Development Cooperation; 1981–1982	Succeeded by Eegje Schoo
Preceded by Rudolf de Korte	Minister of the Interior; 1986–1987; 1987–1989	Succeeded by Frits Korthals Altes; Ad interim
Preceded by Jan de Koning; Ad interim	Minister of the Interior; 1986–1987; 1987–1989	Succeeded by Ien Dales
