= Karin Straus =

Dutch politician

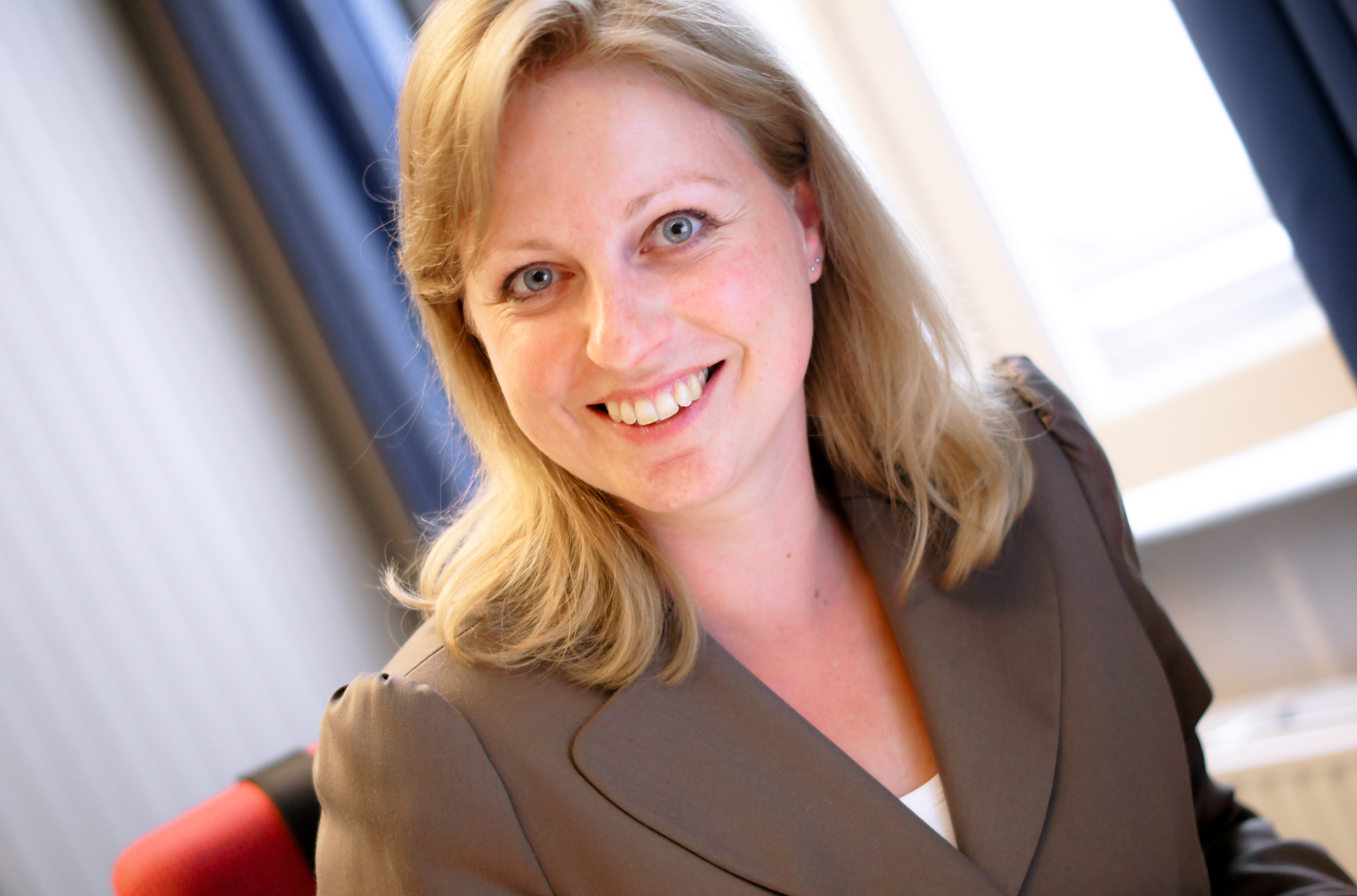
- Karin Straus

Member of the House of Representatives
- In office 26 October 2010 – 23 March 2017

Personal details
- Born: Karin Cornelia Josepha Straus; 6 April 1971 (age 55) Roermond
- Party: People's Party for Freedom and Democracy
- Occupation: Politician

Karin Straus (born 6 April 1971 in Roermond) is a Dutch politician and former human resource management employee and management consultant. As a member of the People's Party for Freedom and Democracy (Volkspartij voor Vrijheid en Democratie) she was an MP between 26 October 2010 and 23 March 2017. She focused on matters of financial arrangements for children (among others child care), social and psychiatric care, and drug rehabilitation.

She was a member of the municipal council of Roermond from 1998 to 2003 as well as VVD fraction leader from 2002 to 2003. Since 11 March 2010 she has been again a council member of this Dutch Limburg municipality. In the meantime she was a member of the municipal council as well as VVD fraction leader of the South Holland municipality of Midden-Delfland from 2004 to 2006.

Straus studied public administration at Radboud University Nijmegen and organizational and management studies at VU University Amsterdam. She also studied at Nyenrode Business University.
