= Jan de Koning (politician) =

Dutch politician (1926–1994)

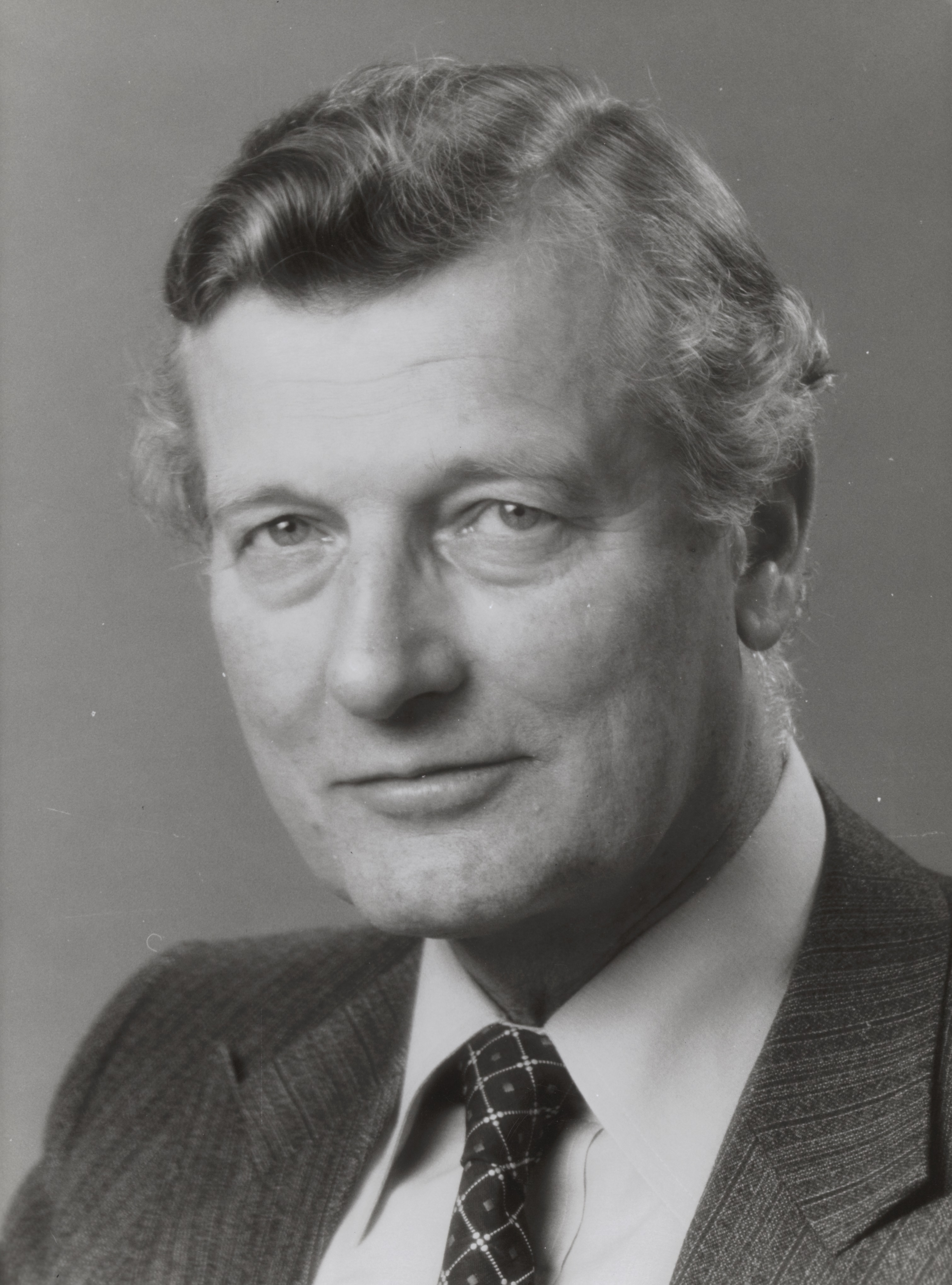
- De Koning in 1979

Extraordinary Member of the Council of State
- In office 1 January 1990 – 8 October 1994
- Vice President: Willem Scholten

Minister of the Interior
- In office 3 February 1987 – 6 May 1987; Ad interim
- Prime Minister: Ruud Lubbers
- Preceded by: Frits Korthals Altes (ad interim)
- Succeeded by: Kees van Dijk

Minister of Social Affairs and Employment
- In office 6 May 1987 – 7 November 1989
- Prime Minister: Ruud Lubbers
- Preceded by: Louw de Graaf (ad interim)
- Succeeded by: Bert de Vries
- In office 4 November 1982 – 3 February 1987
- Prime Minister: Ruud Lubbers
- Preceded by: Louw de Graaf
- Succeeded by: Louw de Graaf (ad interim)

Minister for Netherlands Antilles and Aruba Affairs
- In office 4 November 1982 – 7 November 1989
- Prime Minister: Ruud Lubbers
- Preceded by: Himself as Minister for Netherlands Antilles Affairs
- Succeeded by: Ruud Lubbers (ad interim)

Minister for Netherlands Antilles Affairs
- In office 29 May 1982 – 4 November 1982
- Prime Minister: Dries van Agt
- Preceded by: Joop den Uyl
- Succeeded by: Himself as Minister for Netherlands Antilles and Aruba Affairs

Minister of Agriculture and Fisheries
- In office 11 September 1981 – 4 November 1982
- Prime Minister: Dries van Agt
- Preceded by: Gerrit Braks
- Succeeded by: Gerrit Braks

Minister of Defence
- In office 4 March 1978 – 8 March 1978; Ad interim
- Prime Minister: Dries van Agt
- Preceded by: Roelof Kruisinga
- Succeeded by: Willem Scholten

Minister for Development Cooperation
- In office 19 December 1977 – 11 September 1981
- Prime Minister: Dries van Agt
- Preceded by: Jan Pronk
- Succeeded by: Kees van Dijk

Chairman of the Anti-Revolutionary Party
- In office 11 May 1973 – 13 December 1975
- Leader: Barend Biesheuvel (1973); Willem Aantjes (1973–1975)
- Preceded by: Antoon Veerman
- Succeeded by: Hans de Boer

Member of the European Parliament
- In office 22 September 1971 – 19 December 1977
- Parliamentary group: Christian Democratic Group
- Constituency: Netherlands

Member of the House of Representatives
- In office 3 June 1986 – 14 July 1986
- In office 16 September 1982 – 4 November 1982
- In office 10 June 1981 – 9 September 1981
- In office 10 May 1971 – 19 December 1977

Member of the Senate
- In office 16 September 1969 – 10 May 1971

Member of the Social and Economic Council
- In office 1 February 1964 – 16 September 1969
- Chairman: See list: Gerard Verrijn Stuart (1964) Jan de Pous (1964–1969)

Personal details
- Born: Jan de Koning; 31 August 1926 Zwartsluis, Netherlands
- Died: 8 October 1994 (aged 68) Leiden, Netherlands
- Cause of death: Cancer
- Party: Christian Democratic Appeal (from 1980)
- Other political affiliations: Anti-Revolutionary Party (until 1980)
- Spouse: Molly Rellum (m. 1956)
- Children: 2 sons
- Education: Utrecht University (B.Soc.Sc, MSSc)
- Occupation: Politician · Civil servant · Social geographer · Researcher · Corporate director · Nonprofit director · Trade association executive · Professor · Soldier

Military service
- Allegiance: Netherlands
- Branch/service: Royal Netherlands; East Indies Army
- Years of service: 1945–1948 (Active duty); 1948–1952 (Reserve)
- Rank: Corporal
- Battles/wars: Indonesian National Revolution; Operation Product

Jan de Koning (31 August 1926 – 8 October 1994) was a Dutch politician of the defunct Anti-Revolutionary Party (ARP) and later the Christian Democratic Appeal (CDA) party and social geographer.

De Koning joined the Dutch resistance against the German occupation in September 1943, at the time barely 17 years old. Following the end of World War II, he volunteered and enlisted in the Royal Netherlands East Indies Army as a corporal serving in the Dutch East Indies from August 1945 until June 1948. He studied Social geography at the Utrecht University and obtained a Master of Social Science degree. He worked as a trade association executive for the Christian Farmers and Gardeners association (CBTB) from February 1955 until May 1971 and as a researcher at the Royal Netherlands Academy of Arts and Sciences from November 1961 until January 1964. In the 1969 Senate election, De Koning was elected to the Senate on 16 September 1969, and served as a frontbencher and spokesperson for agriculture. After the 1971 general election, he was elected to the House of Representatives on 10 May 1971 and served as a frontbencher and spokesperson for agriculture and development cooperation. He was also selected as a Member of the European Parliament on 22 September 1971 and dual served in both positions and served as Party Chairman from 11 May 1973 until 13 December 1975.

After the 1977 general election, De Koning was appointed Minister for Development Cooperation in the Van Agt–Wiegel cabinet, taking office on 19 December 1977. After the 1981 general election, he was appointed Minister of Agriculture and Fisheries in the Van Agt II cabinet taking office on 11 September 1981. The cabinet fell just seven months into its term and was replaced by the caretaker Van Agt III cabinet, with De Koning retaining his position and also taking over the portfolio of Netherlands Antilles Affairs, taking office on 29 May 1982. After the 1982 general election, De Koning was appointed Minister of Social Affairs and Employment and also retained the portfolio of Netherlands Antilles and Aruba Affairs in the Lubbers I cabinet, taking office on 4 November 1982. After the 1986 general election, De Koning again continued his offices in the Lubbers II cabinet. He was appointed acting Minister of the Interior following a cabinet reshuffle, serving from 3 February 1987 until 6 May 1987. In July 1989, De Koning announced that he would not stand for the 1989 general election and declined to serve in new cabinet.

De Koning continued to be active in politics and in December 1989 was nominated as a member of the Council of State on 1 January 1990. De Koning also became active in the public sector as non-profit director and serves on several state commissions and councils on behalf of the government, and worked as a distinguished professor of Social geography at the University of Groningen from January 1991. In August 1994, De Koning was diagnosed with terminal cancer and died just three months later in October 1994 at the age of 68. De Koning was known for his abilities as a skilful manager and effective consensus builder. He holds the distinction as the longest-serving Minister of Social Affairs with 7 years, 3 days in Dutch history.

== Decorations ==
Military decorations
Ribbon bar	Decoration	Country	Date	Comment
	Medal for Order and Peace	Netherlands	10 December 1948	
	Resistance Memorial Cross	Netherlands	30 April 1982	
Honours
Ribbon bar	Honour	Country	Date	Comment
	Commander of the Legion of Honour	France	12 November 1979	
	Knight of the Order of the Netherlands Lion	Netherlands	26 October 1981	
	Grand Cross of the Order of the Crown	Belgium	6 July 1986	
	Knight Grand Cross of the Order of Orange-Nassau	Netherlands	20 November 1989	

Party political offices
Preceded by Antoon Veerman	Chairman of the Anti-Revolutionary Party; 1973–1975	Succeeded by Hans de Boer
Political offices
Preceded by Jan Pronk	Minister for Development Cooperation; 1977–1981	Succeeded by Kees van Dijk
Preceded by Roelof Kruisinga	Minister of Defence; Ad interim 1978	Succeeded by Willem Scholten
Preceded by Gerrit Braks	Minister of Agriculture and Fisheries; 1981–1982	Succeeded by Gerrit Braks
Preceded by Joop den Uyl	Minister for Suriname and Netherlands Antilles Affairs; 1982–1989	Succeeded by Ruud Lubbers; Ad interim
Preceded by Louw de Graaf	Minister of Social Affairs and Employment; 1982–1987; 1987–1989	Succeeded by Louw de Graaf; Ad interim
Preceded by Louw de Graaf; Ad interim	Minister of Social Affairs and Employment; 1982–1987; 1987–1989	Succeeded by Bert de Vries
Preceded by Frits Korthals Altes; Ad interim	Minister of the Interior; Ad interim 1987	Succeeded by Kees van Dijk
Business positions
Unknown	General-Secretary of the Executive Board of the Christian Farmers and Gardeners association 1964–1971	Unknown
