= Marten Burkens =

Dutch politician (1934–2022)

Member of the Senate
- In office 13 September 1983 – 23 June 1987

Personal details
- Born: 9 November 1934; Amsterdam, Netherlands
- Died: 1 November 2022 (aged 87); Utrecht, Netherlands
- Political party: People's Party for Freedom and Democracy

Marten Cornelis Boudewijn Burkens (9 November 1934 – 1 November 2022) was a Dutch emeritus law professor and politician. He was professor of state and administrative law at the Erasmus University Rotterdam (1971–1975) and Utrecht University (1975–1995). Burkens served in the Senate for the People's Party for Freedom and Democracy between 1983 and 1987.

== Life and career ==
Burkens was born in Amsterdam on 9 November 1934. After attending the gymnasium he studied law at Utrecht University. He obtained his title of doctor on 30 June 1971 under W.F. Prins with a dissertation titled: "Beperking van grondrechten".

Burkens worked for the cabinet of the King's Commissioner of Gelderland between 1961 and 1964. He subsequently moved to the Ministry of the Interior where he worked in the constitutional law section until 1969. In September 1969 he was appointed as teacher of state and administrative law at the Netherlands School of Economics in Rotterdam. Two years later he was appointed as professor. In 1973 the School was renamed as Erasmus University Rotterdam. Burkens continued to work there until 1975. In October of that year he started as professor of state and administrative law at Utrecht University. He retired on 1 December 1995.

Burkens was elected a member of the Royal Netherlands Academy of Arts and Sciences in 1993.

=== Political career ===
Burkens was a member of the Labour Party and Democrats 66 before joining the People's Party for Freedom and Democracy in 1976. He served for that party in the Senate between 13 September 1983 and 23 June 1987. In the Senate he was concerned with justice affairs and higher education.

=== Death ===
Burkens died in Utrecht on 1 November 2022, at the age of 87.
