= Pol de Beer =

Dutch politician (1934–2024)

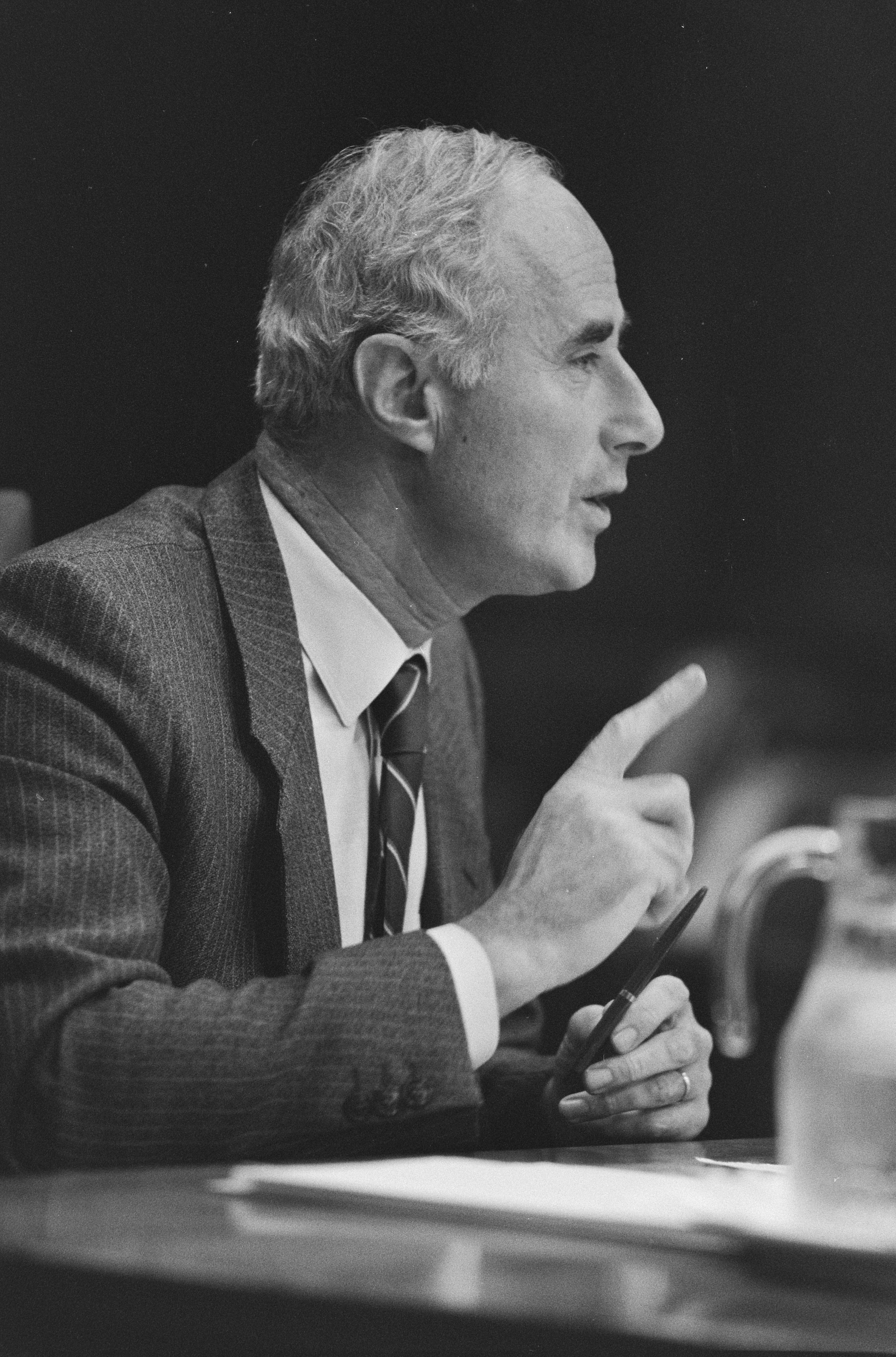
- De Beer in 1987

Member of the Senate of the Netherlands
- In office 5 September 1995 – 9 June 2003
- In office 10 January 1995 – 12 June 1995

Member of the House of Representatives of the Netherlands
- In office 5 November 1969 – 13 September 1989

Personal details
- Born: Leopold Michiel de Beer; 6 August 1934 Wenduine, Belgium
- Died: 13 March 2024 (aged 89) Vlaardingen, Netherlands
- Party: VVD
- Occupation: Engineer

Leopold Michiel "Pol" de Beer (6 August 1934 – 13 March 2024) was a Dutch engineer and politician. A member of the People's Party for Freedom and Democracy, he served in the House of Representatives from 1969 to 1989 and in the Senate from 1995 to 2003.

De Beer died in Vlaardingen on 13 March 2024, at the age of 89.
