= Arie Pais =

Dutch politician and economist (1930–2022)

His Excellency Arie Pais
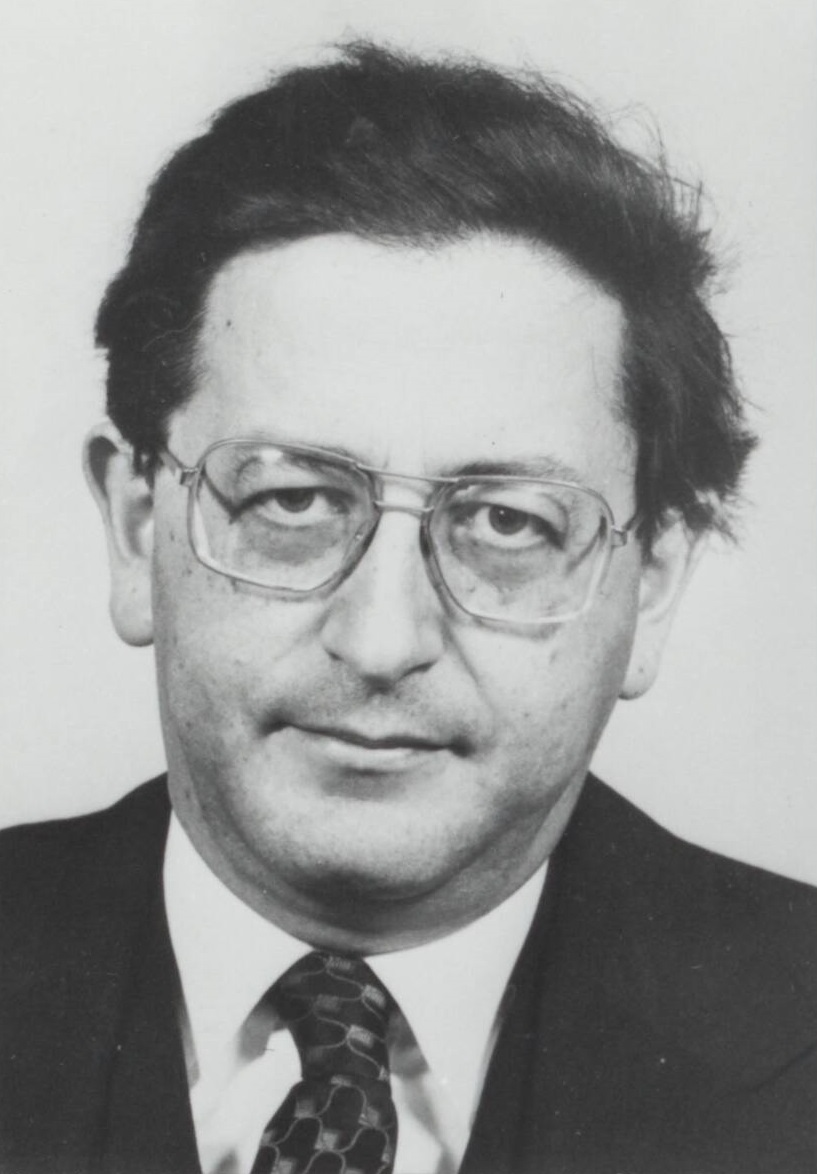
- Pais in 1977

Minister of Education and Sciences
- In office 19 December 1977 – 11 September 1981
- Prime Minister: Dries van Agt
- Preceded by: Jos van Kemenade
- Succeeded by: Jos van Kemenade

Member of the Senate
- In office 25 August 1981 – 16 June 1982
- In office 20 September 1977 – 19 December 1977
- Parliamentary group: People's Party for Freedom and Democracy

Personal details
- Born: Aäron Pais; 16 April 1930 The Hague, Netherlands
- Died: 25 June 2022 (aged 92) Amsterdam, Netherlands
- Party: People's Party for Freedom and Democracy (from 1962)
- Other political affiliations: Labour Party (1948–1961)
- Spouse: Eegje Schoo (m. 1970)
- Education: University of Amsterdam (Bachelor of Economics, Master of Economics, Doctor of Philosophy)
- Occupation: Politician · Economist · Financial analyst · Researcher · Banker · Corporate director · Nonprofit director · Academic administrator · Author · Professor

Aäron "Arie" Pais (16 April 1930 – 25 June 2022) was a Dutch politician of the People's Party for Freedom and Democracy (VVD) and economist.

== Early life and education ==
Pais was of Jewish descent. Before World War II, he attended from 1942 on his secondary education at gymnasium level at the Jewish Lyceum in Amsterdam. Due to persecutions of the Jewish population during this war, he went into hiding with his family in Barneveld and thus survived the war. After the war, Pais continued his secondary education at the Vossius Gymnasium in Amsterdam between 1945 and 1948, and then studied at the University of Amsterdam where he received his doctorandus degree (equivalent to MSc) in social economics in 1954. After this study, Pais was appointed as a researcher at this university where he subsequently obtained his doctorate (PhD) in economic sciences in 1973.

== Career ==
Pais worked as a financial analyst for the KPN from July 1958 until April 1974. Pais served on the Municipal Council of Amsterdam from September 1958 until December 1961 and served on the Provincial-Council of North Holland from June 1970 until July 1970. Pais worked as a professor of Public economics at the University of Amsterdam from April 1974 until 19 December 1977

Pais was elected as a Member of the Senate after the Senate election of 1977, taking office on 20 September 1977 serving as a frontbencher and spokesperson for Finances. After the election of 1977 Pais was appointed as Minister of Education and Sciences in the Cabinet Van Agt-Wiegel, taking office on 19 December 1977. In January 1981 Pais announced that he wouldn't stand for the election of 1981 but wanted to return to the Senate. After the Senate election of 1981 Pais returned as a Member of the Senate, taking office on 25 August 1981. The Cabinet Van Agt-Wiegel was replaced by the Cabinet Van Agt II following the cabinet formation of 1981 on 11 September 1981 and he continued to serve in the Senate serving a frontbencher chairing the parliamentary committee for Finances and spokesperson for Finances.

== Personal life ==
He was married to Dutch politician and diplomat Eegje Schoo from 1970 until his death. Pais died in 2022 at the age of 92.

== Honours ==
Honours
| Ribbon bar | Honour | Country | Date | Comment |
| | Knight of the Order of the Netherlands Lion | Netherlands | 26 October 1981 | |
| | Commander of the Order of Orange-Nassau | Netherlands | 1 September 1988 | |

Political offices
| Preceded by Jos van Kemenade | Minister of Education and Sciences; 1977–1981 | Succeeded by Jos van Kemenade |
Business positions
| Unknown | Vice President of the European Investment Bank; 1982–1988 | Unknown |
