= Rian Vogels =

Dutch politician

Member of the Senate
- Incumbent
- Assumed office 13 June 2023

Personal details
- Born: Henrica Wilhelmina Vogels; 24 February 1970 (age 56) Deurne, Netherlands
- Party: VVD
- Children: 3
- Education: Leiden University; University of Connecticut

Henrica Wilhelmina "Rian" Vogels (born 24 February 1970) is a Dutch politician, executive, and former judge and lawyer. She has been a member of the Senate for the People's Party for Freedom and Democracy (VVD) since 13 June 2023.

== Early life ==
Vogels was born on 24 February 1970 in Deurne and attended secondary school there at the St. Willibrord Gymnasium. She subsequently studied Dutch civil law at Leiden University and international law in the United States at the University of Connecticut.

Vogels worked as a lawyer in Rotterdam and Amsterdam from 1997 to 2007. She then served as a judge in Rotterdam from 2007 to 2013 and as a senior judge in The Hague from 2013 to January 2020. She was also a member of the recusal chamber in The Hague until 2020.

From January 2020, she was chair of the newly established Integrity Chamber of the Caribbean island of Sint Maarten. From June 2020, she was a member of the Mining Damage Commission (Commissie Mijnbouwschade), a body intended to serve as a point of contact for people whose property was damaged by mining in the Netherlands, excluding the Groningen gas field. She has also been a member of the supervisory board of the Sint Maartenskliniek since September 2022.

== Political career ==
Vogels is a member of the liberal People's Party for Freedom and Democracy (VVD). She was chair of the VVD's Heemstede branch from 2004 to 2008 and of the Kennemerland regional branch from 2015 to 2017. Since June 13, 2023, she has been a member of the Senate for the VVD, for which she resigned from her position at the Mining Damage Commission, and from her position at the Sint Maarten Integrity Chamber on October 1 of that year. As a senator, Vogels focuses on justice and public safety, relations within the Kingdom of the Netherlands, and finance.

== Personal life ==
Vogels is married and has a son and two daughters.
