= Marian Kaljouw =

Dutch politician (born 1956)

Member of the Senate
- Incumbent
- Assumed office 13 June 2023

Personal details
- Born: 17 June 1956 (age 70) Bergen op Zoom
- Party: People's Party for Freedom and Democracy
- Education: Maastricht University

Marian J. Kaljouw (born 17 June 1956) is a Dutch politician of the conservative-liberal People's Party for Freedom and Democracy (VVD).

== Biography ==
Kaljouw was born in 1956 in Bergen op Zoom. She pursued her PhD at Maastricht University from 1993 until 1998.

She became a member of the Senate on 13 June 2023 following a Senate election. She held her maiden speech during a debate about the Dispersal Act on 15 January 2024, and she announced the following day that her parliamentary group would vote in favor of the bill one week later. The Dispersal Act was intended to more fairly distribute asylum seekers across the Netherlands. Kaljouw said it could mitigate issues with the sheltering of refugees, but she called additional measures to reduce the influx necessary. The VVD had not supported the bill in the House of Representatives, and party leader Dilan Yeşilgöz had in a motion unsuccessfully called on the Senate to suspend its consideration of the bill.

== Personal life ==
Kaljouw lived in Buurmalsen as a Senator, and she is married. She became a Knight of the Order of Orange-Nassau in June 2012.
