= Gilles Borrie =

Dutch politician

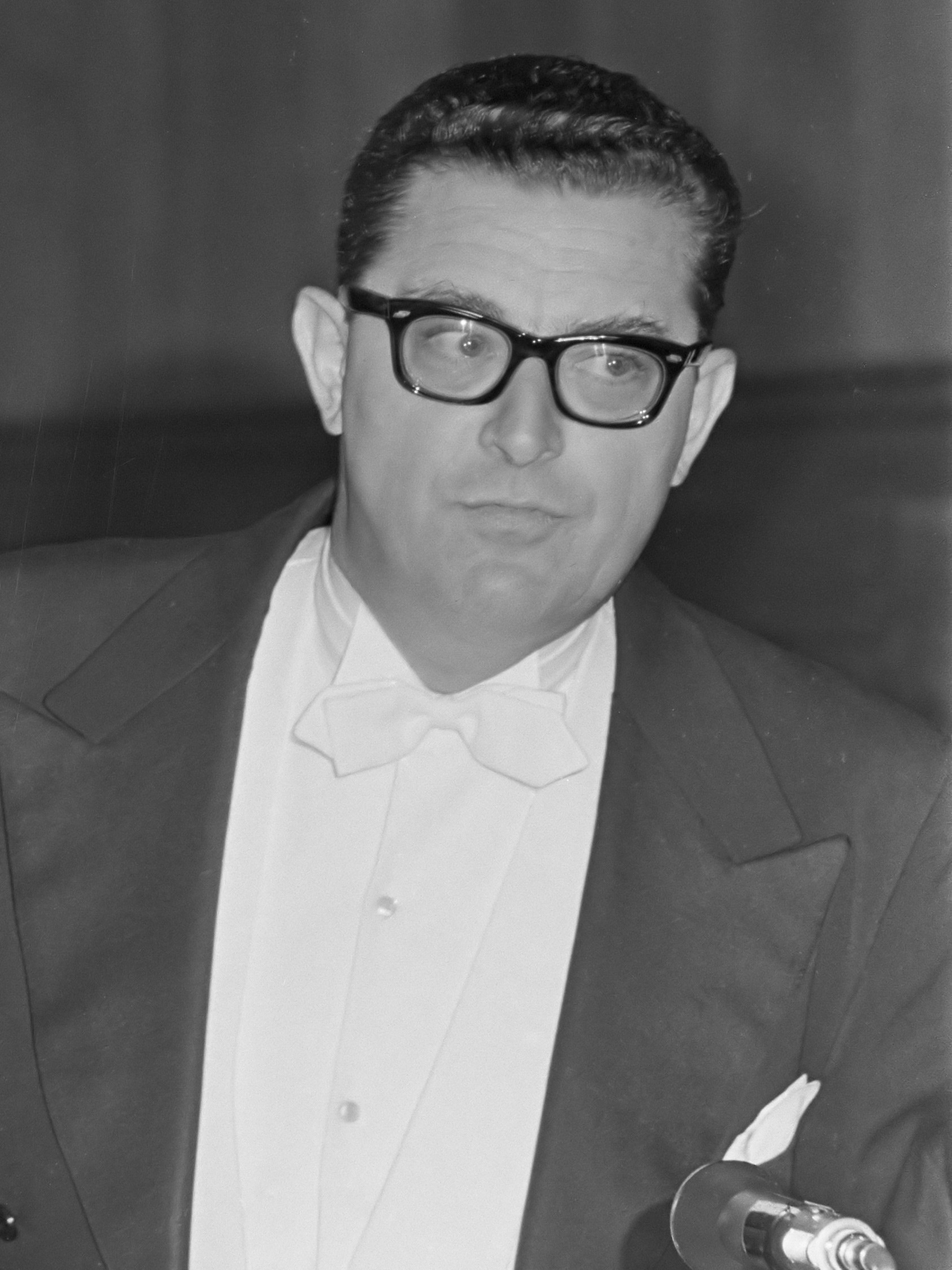
- Borrie in 1968

Mayor of Eindhoven
- In office 16 August 1979 – 1 March 1988
- Preceded by: Jaap van der Lee
- Succeeded by: Jos van Kemenade

Mayor of Rheden
- In office 1973–1979
- Preceded by: J.P. Drost
- Succeeded by: Huib van Walsum

Mayor of Tiel
- In office 1968–1973
- Preceded by: Andries Stolk
- Succeeded by: Klaas Broekens

Mayor of Sleen
- In office 1960–1968
- Preceded by: P. ten Hoorn
- Succeeded by: Gerard Kolthoff

Personal details
- Born: 26 September 1925; Bergen op Zoom, North Brabant, Netherlands
- Died: 28 December 2016 (aged 91); Eindhoven, North Brabant, Netherlands
- Political party: Labour Party
- Occupation: Historian

Gilles Willem Benjamin Borrie (26 September 1925 – 28 December 2016) was a Dutch politician and historian. He was a member of the Labour Party. He served as the mayor of Sleen (1960–1968), Tiel (1968–1973), Rheden (1973–1979) and Eindhoven (1979–1987). He was born in Bergen op Zoom, North Brabant.

Borrie died on 28 December 2016 in Eindhoven at the age of 91.
