= Borrie Church =

- Borrie kyrka
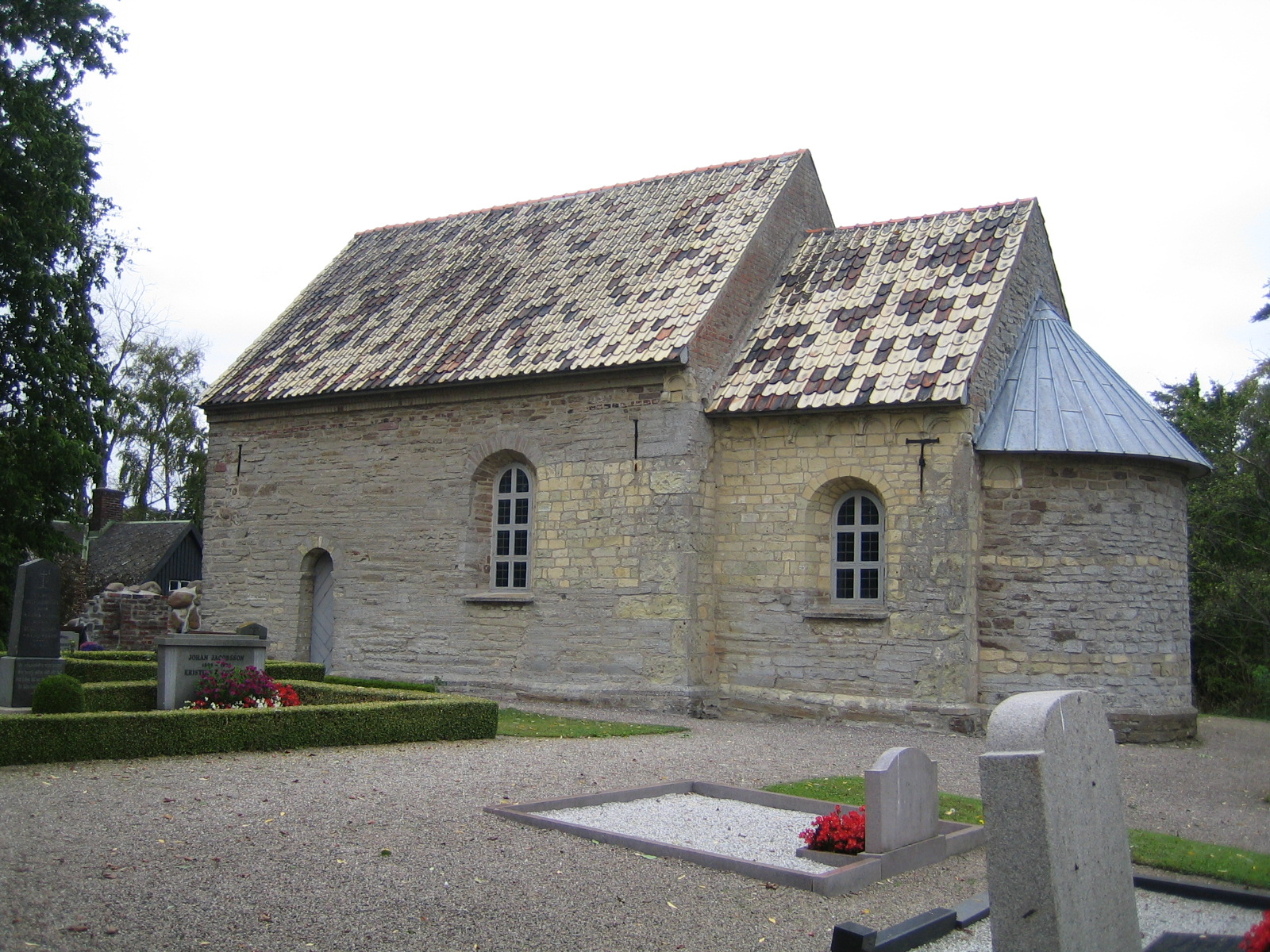
- Borrie Church

- 55°29′29″N 13°51′22″E
- Country: Sweden
- Denomination: Church of Sweden

Administration
- Diocese: Lund

Borrie Church (Swedish: Borrie kyrka) is a medieval church in the province of Scania, Sweden. It is one of the smallest Romanesque churches in the province. It belongs to the Diocese of Lund.

== History and architecture ==
Borrie Church is one of the smallest Romanesque churches in Scania. It was built as a church belonging to the farmstead of a local lord during the first half of the 12th century. It retains much of its original details, such as the northern and southern portals and the architectural element connecting the nave with the choir in the form of a triumphal arch. It contains Romanesque sculptures. In general, the architecture displays influences from Anglo-Saxon architecture; one source mentions St Bene't's Church in Cambridge as a direct influence.

The original church has been altered little in the course of history. A western tower was built during the 13th century but probably collapsed already during the late Middle Ages. A church porch was built in front of the southern portal during the 15th century, but removed in 1874. In 1874 the apse and the westerns' gable of the church were also destroyed, after which the church was abandoned. It was restored in 1928-29, and the apse and gable rebuilt. In 1978, the church was depicted on the association Skåneland's flag Christmas stamps.
