= Roel de Wit =

Dutch politician

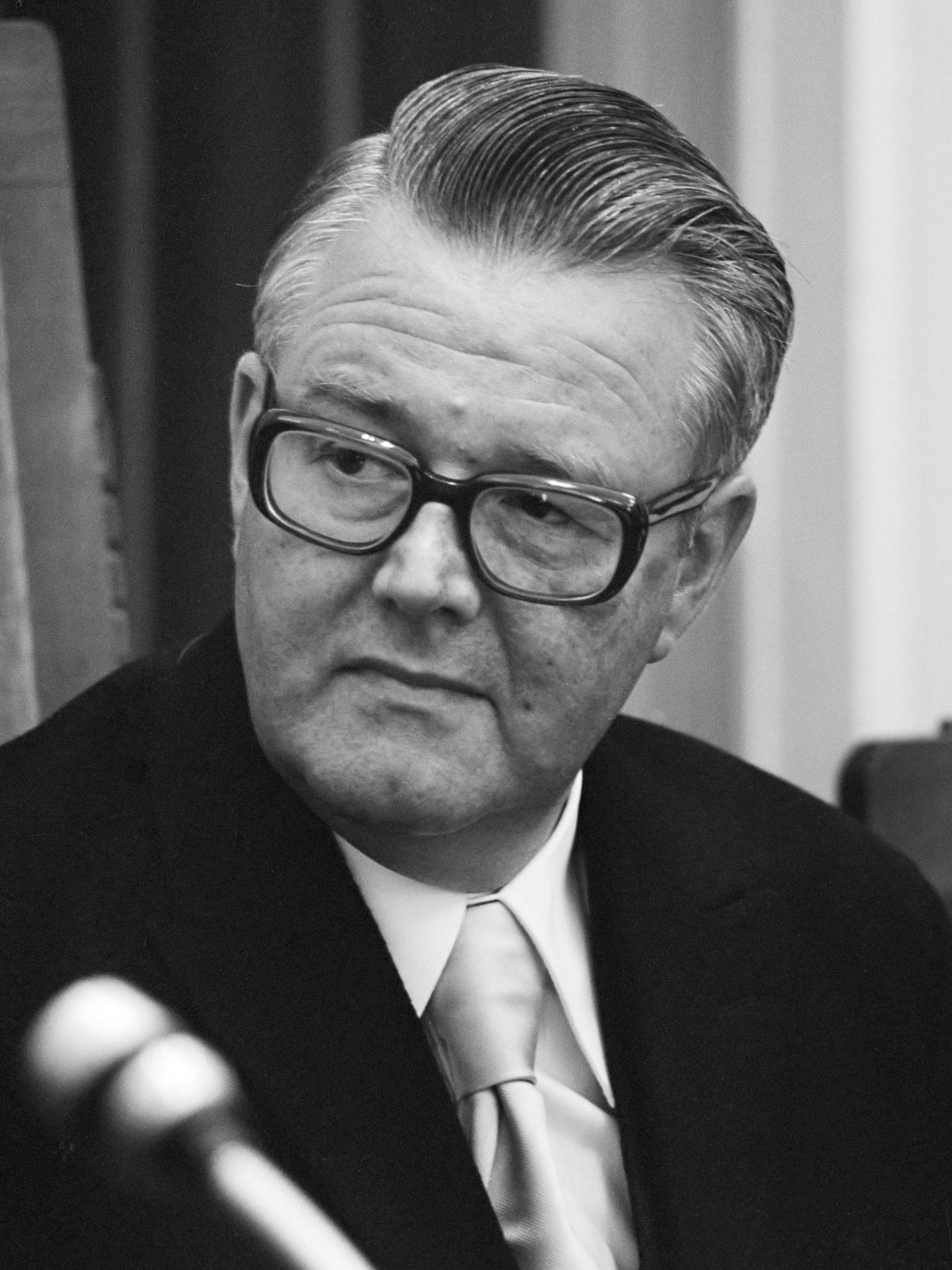
Roel de Wit (1976)

Roelof Josephus "Roel" de Wit (31 March 1927 in Amsterdam – 3 June 2012 in Haarlem) was a Dutch politician of the Labour Party (PvdA) and a conservationist.

De Wit studied biology at the University of Amsterdam. He became a member of the Provincial States of North Holland in 1958 and a member of the municipal council of Amsterdam in 1962. From 1965 to 1970 he was an alderman of Amsterdam.

He served as Mayor of Alkmaar from 1970 until 1976 and as Queen's Commissioner of North Holland from 1976 until 1992. He retired in 1992.

De Wit died at the age of 85 in his hometown of Haarlem in 2012.
