= Haya van Someren =

Dutch politician

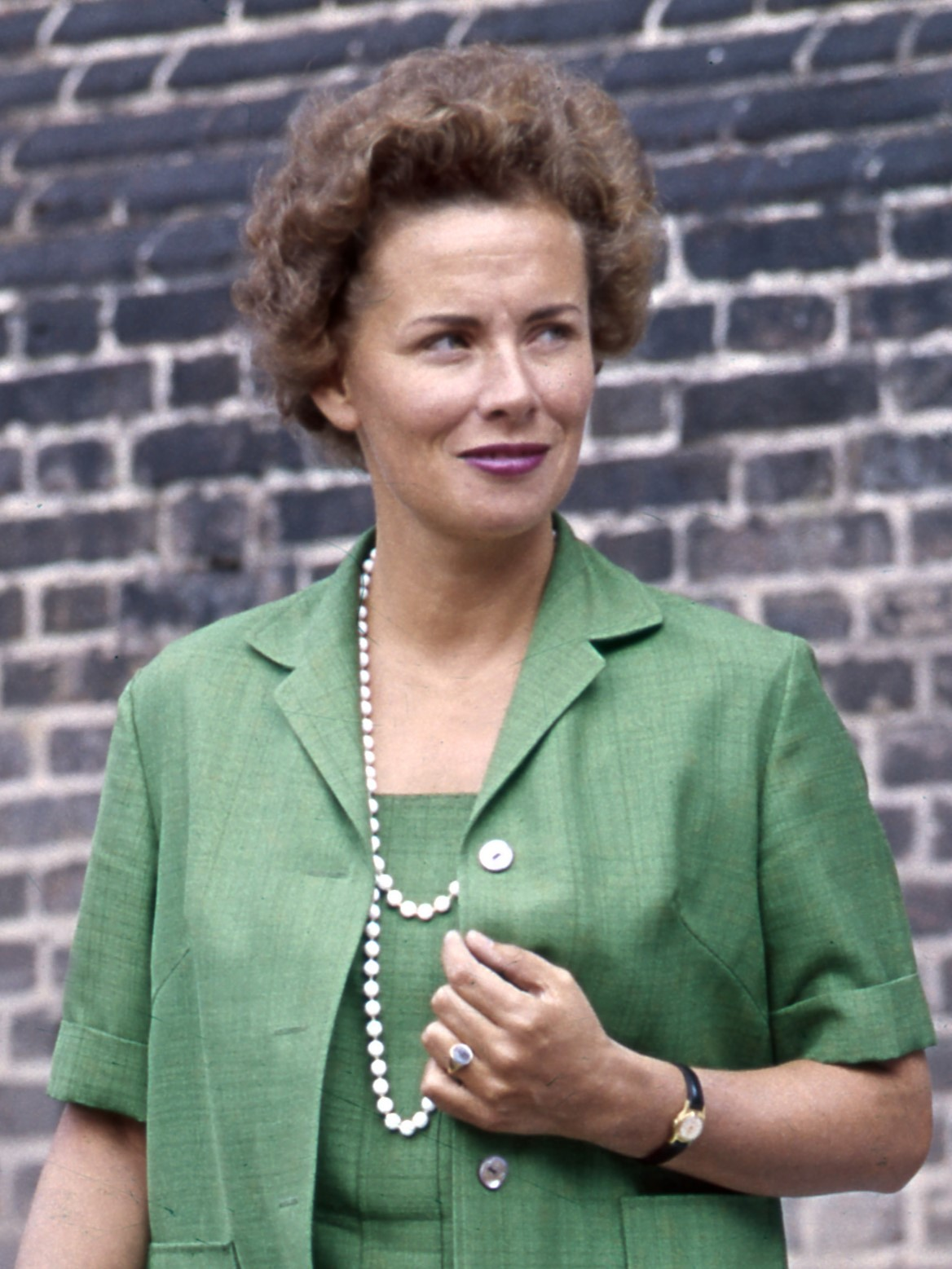
- Haya van Someren in 1963

Parliamentary leader in the Senate
- In office 3 June 1976 – 12 November 1980
- Preceded by: Harm van Riel
- Succeeded by: Guus Zoutendijk
- Parliamentary group: People's Party for Freedom and Democracy

Member of the Senate
- In office 17 September 1974 – 12 November 1980

Chairwoman of the People's Party for Freedom and Democracy
- In office 29 March 1969 – 15 March 1975
- Leader: See list: Edzo Toxopeus (1969) Molly Geertsema (1969–1971) Hans Wiegel (1971–1975)<ll>
- Preceded by: Kornelis van der Pols
- Succeeded by: Frits Korthals Altes

Member of the House of Representatives
- In office 20 March 1959 – 1 October 1968

Personal details
- Born: Gerarda Victoria Downer; 5 July 1926 Amsterdam, Netherlands
- Died: 12 November 1980 (aged 54) Rotterdam, Netherlands
- Cause of death: Cancer
- Party: People's Party for Freedom and Democracy (from 1948)
- Spouse: Jan van Someren (m. 1954)
- Children: 1 son
- Education: University of Amsterdam (Bachelor of Arts, Bachelor of Social Science)
- Occupation: Politician · Journalist · Editor

Haya Victoria van Someren-Downer (born Gerarda Victoria Downer; 5 July 1926 – 12 November 1980) was a Dutch politician of the People's Party for Freedom and Democracy (VVD) and journalist.

She was a member of the House of Representatives from 20 March 1959 until 1 October 1968. She was the chair of the People's Party for Freedom and Democracy from 29 March 1969 until 15 March 1975. She became a member of the Senate on 17 September 1974 and on 5 June 1976 she succeeded Harm van Riel as the parliamentary leader of the VVD in the Senate after he retired. She died on 12 November 1980 from cancer at the age of 54.

== Decorations ==
Honours
Ribbon bar	Honour	Country	Date	Comment
	Knight of the Order of the Netherlands Lion	Netherlands	10 December 1968	

Party political offices
Preceded by Kornelis van der Pols	Chairwoman of the People's Party for Freedom and Democracy; 1969–1975	Succeeded by Frits Korthals Altes
Preceded by Harm van Riel	Parliamentary leader of the People's Party for Freedom and Democracy in the Senate; 1976–1980	Succeeded by Guus Zoutendijk
