= Harm van Riel =

Dutch politician

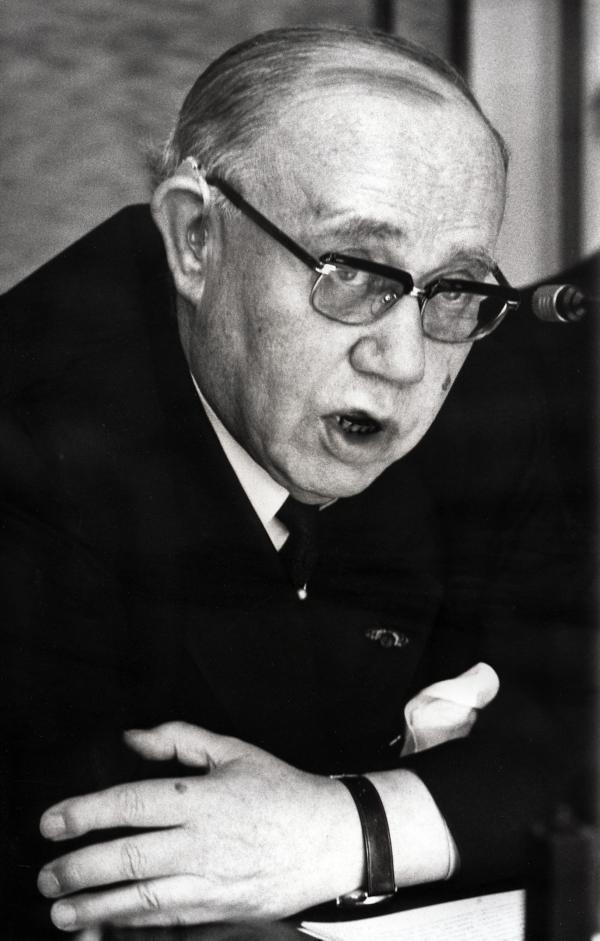
- Harm van Riel in 1976

Parliamentary leader in the Senate
- In office 23 December 1958 – 3 June 1976
- Preceded by: Anthonie Nicolaas Molenaar
- Succeeded by: Haya van Someren
- Parliamentary group: People's Party for Freedom and Democracy

Member of the Senate
- In office 2 July 1963 – 3 June 1976
- In office 6 November 1956 – 5 June 1963

Personal details
- Born: Harm van Riel; 18 February 1907 Hoofddorp, Netherlands
- Died: 13 December 1980 (aged 73) The Hague, Netherlands
- Party: People's Party for Freedom and Democracy (from 1948)
- Other political affiliations: Freedom Party (1946–1948)
- Education: Leiden University (Bachelor of Letters, Bachelor of Laws, Master of Laws)
- Occupation: Politician · Jurist · Businessman · Banker · Author

Harm van Riel (18 February 1907 – 13 December 1980) was a Dutch politician of the People's Party for Freedom and Democracy (VVD) and businessman.

== Career ==
He served as a Member of the Senate from 6 November 1956 until 5 June 1963, and from 2 July 1963 until 3 June 1976. He was the parliamentary leader of the VVD in the Senate from 24 March 1959 until 3 June 1976. A colourful politician, he was a mentor to Hans Wiegel during the latter's tenure as leader of the People's Party for Freedom and Democracy.

== Decorations ==
Honours
Ribbon bar	Honour	Country	Date	Comment
	Knight of the Order of the Netherlands Lion	Netherlands	29 April 1965	

Party political offices
Preceded by Pieter Oud	Vice Chairman of the People's Party for Freedom and Democracy; 1949–1963	Succeeded by Johan Witteveen
Preceded by Anthonie Nicolaas Molenaar	Parliamentary leader of the People's Party for Freedom and Democracy in the Senate; 1958–1976	Succeeded by Haya van Someren
