= David Luteijn =

Dutch politician (1943–2022)

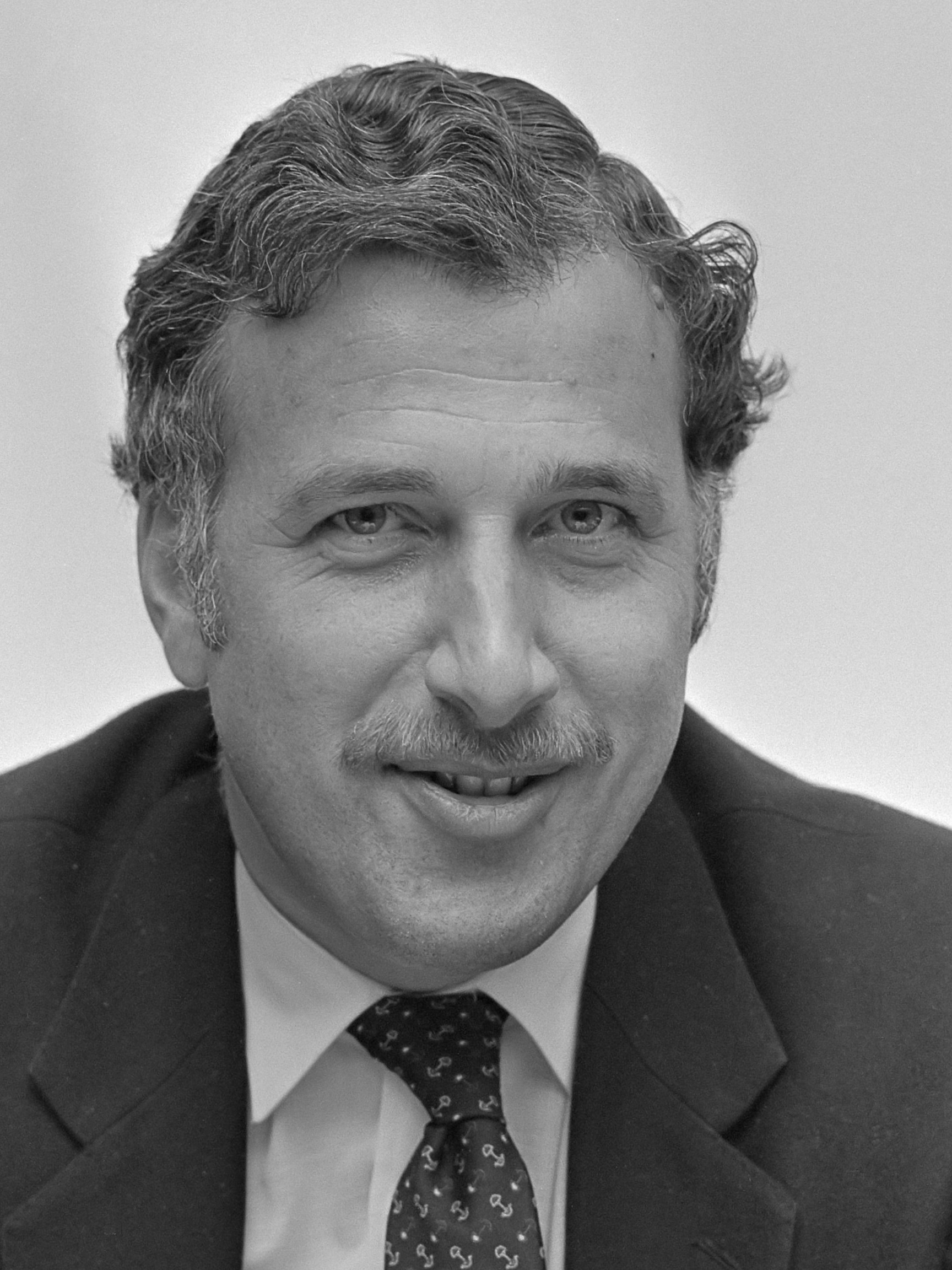

Acting Queen's commissioner of South Holland
- In office 1999–2000
- Monarch: Beatrix
- Preceded by: Joan Leemhuis-Stout
- Succeeded by: Jan Franssen

Parliamentary leader in the Senate
- In office 1987–1995

Member of Senate
- In office 1983–1995

Personal details
- Born: 11 July 1943 Zuidzande, Reichskommissariat Niederlande
- Died: 13 April 2022 (aged 78) Oostburg, Netherlands
- Party: People's Party for Freedom and Democracy

David Luteijn (11 July 1943 – 13 April 2022) was a Dutch engineer and politician who served as a Senator.
