= People's Party for Freedom and Democracy =

Political party in the Netherlands

People's Party for Freedom and Democracy Volkspartij voor Vrijheid en Democratie
- Abbreviation: VVD
- Leader: Dilan Yeşilgöz (List)
- Chairperson: Ton van Nimwegen (List)
- Leader in the Senate: Tanja Klip-Martin
- Leader in the House: Ruben Brekelmans
- Leader in the European Parliament: Malik Azmani
- Founded: 28 January 1948; 78 years ago
- Merger of: Freedom Party, Committee-Oud
- Headquarters: Mauritskade 21, 2514 HD The Hague, South Holland
- Youth wing: Youth Organisation Freedom and Democracy
- Policy institute: Telders Foundation
- Membership (2026): ▲22,483
- Ideology: Conservative liberalism; Liberal conservatism
- Political position: Centre-right
- Regional affiliation: Liberal Group
- European affiliation: Alliance of Liberals and Democrats for Europe
- European Parliament group: Renew Europe (since 2019) (Note: The party was formerly part of ALDE Group (2004–2019) and ELDR Group (1979–2004).)
- International affiliation: Liberal International
- Colours: Ultramarine; Orange
- Senate: 9 / 75
- House of Representatives: 22 / 150
- King's commissioners: 5 / 12
- Provincial councils: 63 / 570
- European Parliament: 4 / 31
- Benelux Parliament: 4 / 21

Website
- vvd.nl

The People's Party for Freedom and Democracy (Dutch: Volkspartij voor Vrijheid en Democratie [ˈvɔl(ə)kspɑrˌtɛi voːr ˈvrɛiɦɛit ɛn deːmoːkra:ˈtsi], VVD) is a centre-right conservative-liberal political party in the Netherlands.

== History ==
=== Founding ===
In 1947, the Freedom Party led by Dirk Stikker and the Committee-Oud led by Pieter Oud started negotiations with the goal of a merger. The conservative liberal Freedom Party was a continuation of the Liberal State Party, but was disappointed with only six seats in the 1946 general election. The Committee-Oud was a group of former members of the social liberal Free-thinking Democratic League (VDB), who had been dissatisfied with the social-democratic character of the Labour Party (PvdA), in which the VDB had merged with the Social Democratic Workers' Party as part of the breakthrough movement. As a result, the part was founded on 24 January 1948.

=== 1948–1963: Oud ===
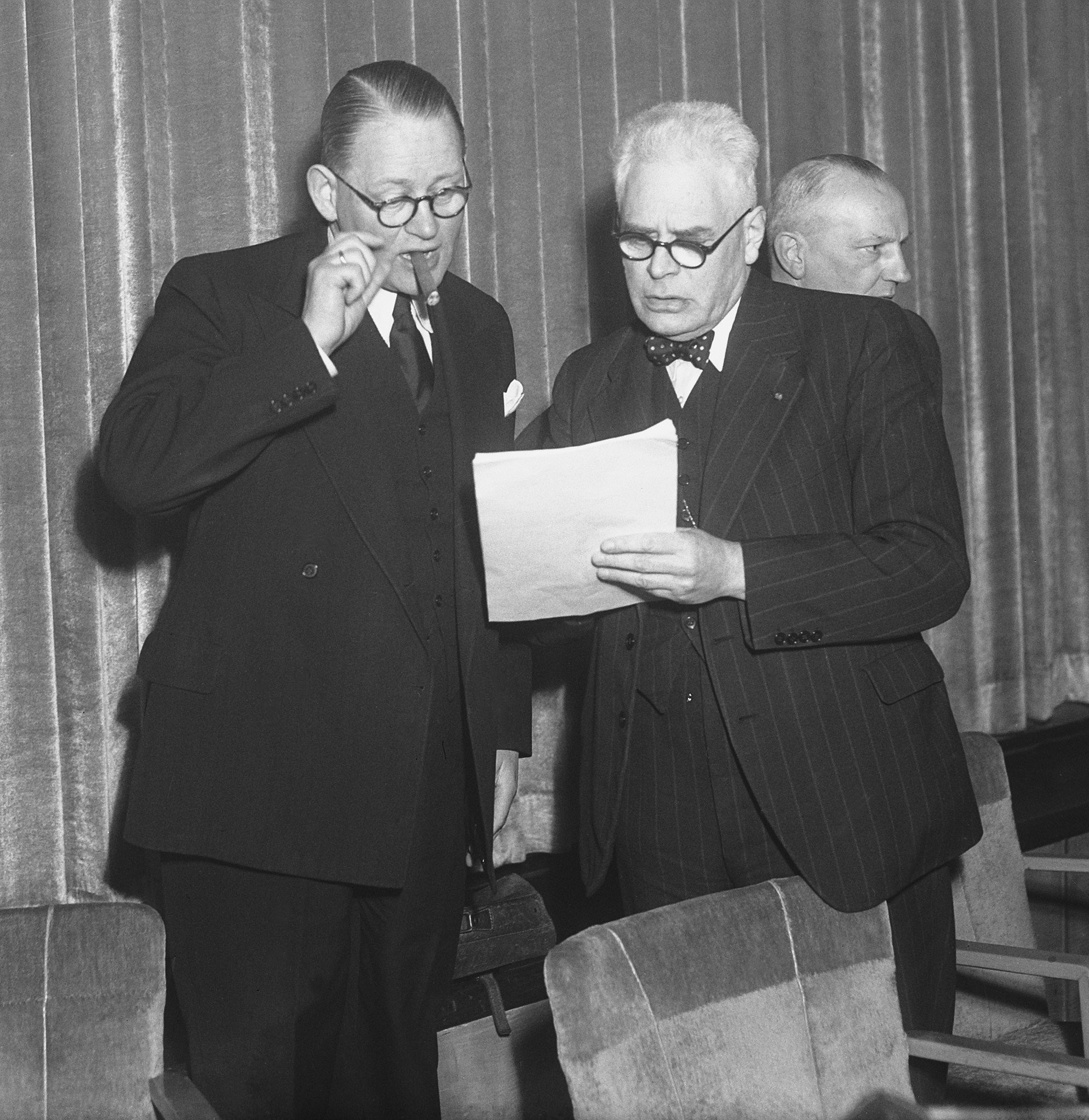
Founders of the VVD, Dirk Stikker and Pieter Oud, in 1949

Between 1948 and 1952, the VVD took part in the broad cabinets led by the Labour Party Prime Minister Willem Drees. The party was a junior partner with only eight seats to the Catholic People's Party (KVP) and Labour Party, which both had around thirty seats (out of 100). The Drees cabinets laid the foundation for the welfare state and decolonisation of the Dutch East Indies.

In the general election of 1952 the VVD gained one seat, but did not join the government. In the general election of 1956 it increased its total, receiving thirteen seats, but was stayed out of government during the cabinet formation, until the general election of 1959, which was held early because of a cabinet crisis. This time it gained nineteen seats, and the party entered government alongside the Protestant Anti-Revolutionary Party (ARP), the Christian Historical Union (CHU) and the KVP.

=== 1963–1971: Toxopeus and Geertsema ===
In 1963, Oud retired from politics, and was succeeded by the Minister of the Interior Edzo Toxopeus. With Toxopeus as its leader, the VVD lost three seats in the 1963 election, but remained in government after the 1963 cabinet formation. In 1962, a substantial group of disillusioned VVD members founded the Liberal Democratic Centre (Dutch: Liberaal Democratisch Centrum, LDC) which was intended to introduce a more twentieth-century liberal direction to the classical liberal VVD.

In 1966, frustrated with their hopeless efforts, left-wing LDC members joined a new political party, the Democrats 66 (D66). In 1965, there also occurred a conflict between VVD Ministers and their counterparts from the KVP and ARP in the Marijnen cabinet. The cabinet fell; without an election taking place, it was replaced by a KVP–ARP–PvdA cabinet under Jo Cals, which itself fell during the Night of Schmelzer the following year. In the subsequent 1967 election the VVD remained relatively stable and entered the De Jong cabinet.

During this period the VVD had loose ties with other liberal organisations; together, these formed the neutral pillar. They included the liberal papers Nieuwe Rotterdamsche Courant and Algemeen Handelsblad, the broadcaster AVRO and the employers' organisation VNO.

=== 1971–1994 ===
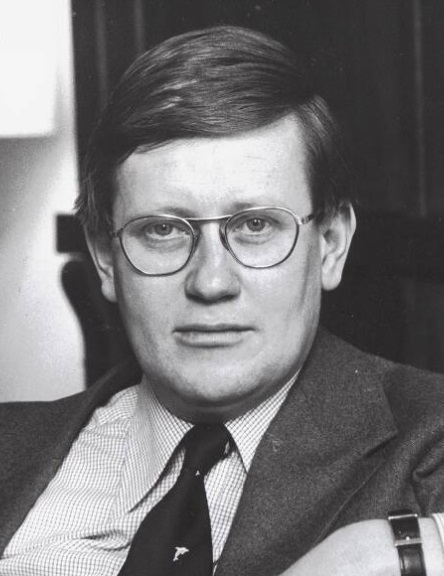
Hans Wiegel, leader from 1971 until 1982

In the Dutch general election of 1971, the VVD lost one seat and the cabinet lost its majority. A new cabinet was formed by the Christian democratic parties, the VVD and the Democratic Socialists '70 (an offshoot of the Labour Party). This cabinet collapsed after a few months. Meanwhile, the charismatic young MP Hans Wiegel had attracted considerable attention, and he became the new leader of the VVD. In 1971, he became the new parliamentary leader, and he was appointed lead candidate in 1972. With Wiegel as its head, the party oriented itself towards a new political course, aiming to reform the welfare state and to cut taxes. Wiegel did not shrink from conflict with the Labour Party and the trade unions. With this new course came new electoral support: working-class and middle-class voters who, because of individualisation and depillarisation, were more easy to attract.

The new course proved electorally profitable for the VVD: in the heavily polarised general election of 1972 the party gained six seats. The VVD was kept out of government by the social democratic and Christian democratic Den Uyl cabinet. Although the ties between the VVD and other organisations within the neutral pillar became ever looser, the number of neutral organisations friendly to the VVD grew. The TROS and later Veronica, new broadcasters which entered the Dutch public broadcasting system, were friendly towards the VVD. In 1977, the VVD again won six more seats, bringing its total to twenty-eight seats. When lengthy coalition talks between the social democrats and Christian democrats eventually led to a final break between the two parties, the VVD formed a cabinet with the Christian Democratic Appeal (CDA), with a majority of only two seats.

In the general election of 1981, the VVD lost two seats and its partner the CDA lost even more. The cabinet lost its majority and CDA, Labour and D66 formed the Second Van Agt cabinet, which fell after only a few months. In 1982, Hans Wiegel left Parliament to become Queen's Commissioner in Friesland and was succeeded by Ed Nijpels. In the general election of 1982 Nijpels' VVD gained ten seats, bringing its total up to 36. It formed the First Lubbers cabinet with the CDA. The cabinet began a programme of radical reform of the welfare state, which is still in place today. The VVD lost nine seats in the 1986 election, but the cabinet nonetheless retained its majority. The losses were blamed on Nijpels, who stood down as leader of the VVD; Joris Voorhoeve succeeded him in 1986. In 1989 the CDA–VVD cabinet fell over a minor issue, and the VVD lost five seats in the subsequent election, retaining only twenty-two in total. The VVD was kept out of government; Voorhoeve stood down and was succeeded by Frits Bolkestein.

=== 1994–2006 ===
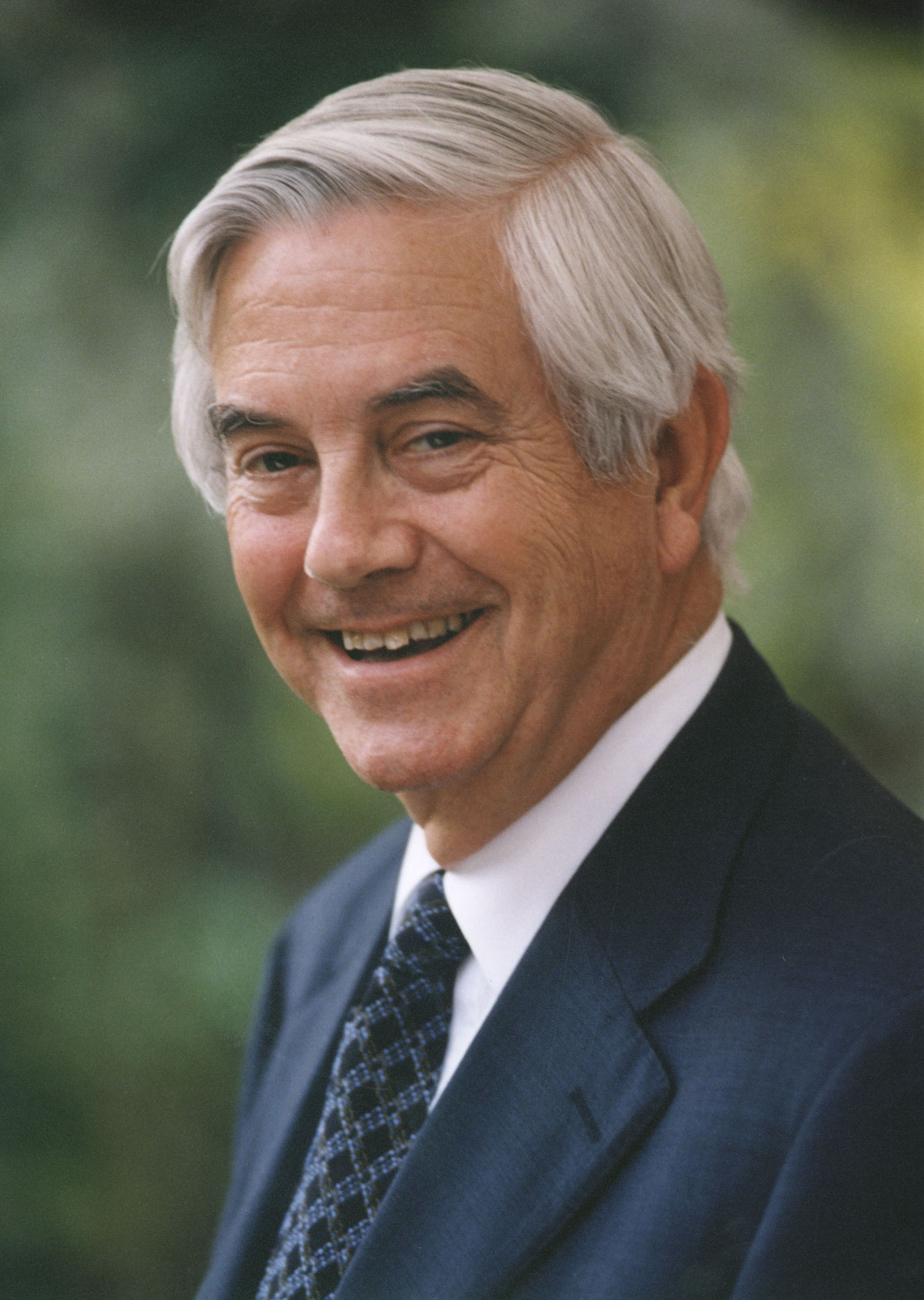
Frits Bolkestein, leader from 1990 until 1998

Bolkestein's VVD was one of the winners of the general election of 1994: the party gained nine seats. It formed an unprecedented government with the Labour Party (PvdA) and the social liberal Democrats 66. The so-called "purple cabinet" led by Wim Kok was the first Dutch government without any Christian parties since 1918. Like many of his predecessors, Bolkestein remained in parliament. His political style was characterised as "opposition to one's own government. This style was very successful and the VVD gained another seven seats in the 1998 election, becoming the second largest party in parliament with thirty-eight seats. The VVD formed a second Purple cabinet with the Labour Party and D66. Bolkestein left Dutch politics in 1999 to become European Commissioner. He was replaced by the more technocratic and social liberal Hans Dijkstal.

In the heavily polarised Dutch general election of 2002, dominated by the rise and murder of Pim Fortuyn, the VVD lost fourteen seats, leaving only twenty-four. The VVD nonetheless entered a cabinet with the Christian Democratic Appeal and the Pim Fortuyn List (LPF). Dijkstal stood down and was replaced by the popular former Minister of Finance Gerrit Zalm. After a few months, Zalm "pulled the plug" on the First Balkenende cabinet, after infighting between LPF ministers Eduard Bomhoff and Herman Heinsbroek.

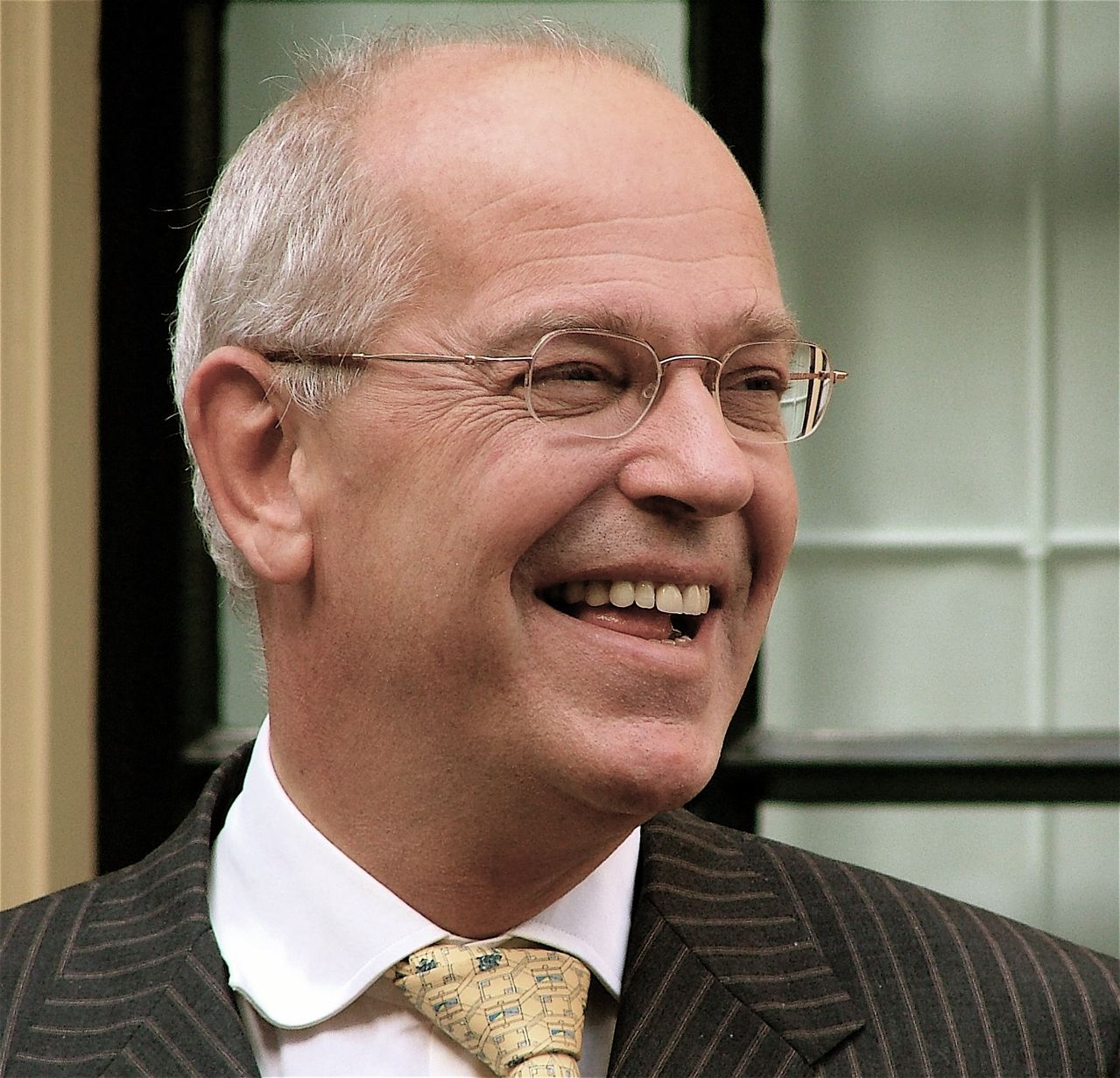
Gerrit Zalm, leader from 2002 until 2004

In the subsequent general election of 2003, the VVD with Gerrit Zalm as lead candidate gained four seats, making a total of twenty-eight. The party had expected to do much better, having adopted most of Fortuyn's proposals on immigration and integration. The VVD unwillingly entered the Second Balkenende cabinet with Zalm returning as Minister of Finance and as Deputy Prime Minister. On 2 September 2004, Geert Wilders, a Member of the House of Representatives, left the party after a dispute with parliamentary leader Van Aartsen. He chose to continue as an Independent in the House of Representatives. On 27 November 2004 Zalm was succeeded as party leader by the parliamentary leader in the House Jozias van Aartsen.

=== 2006–2023: Rutte ===
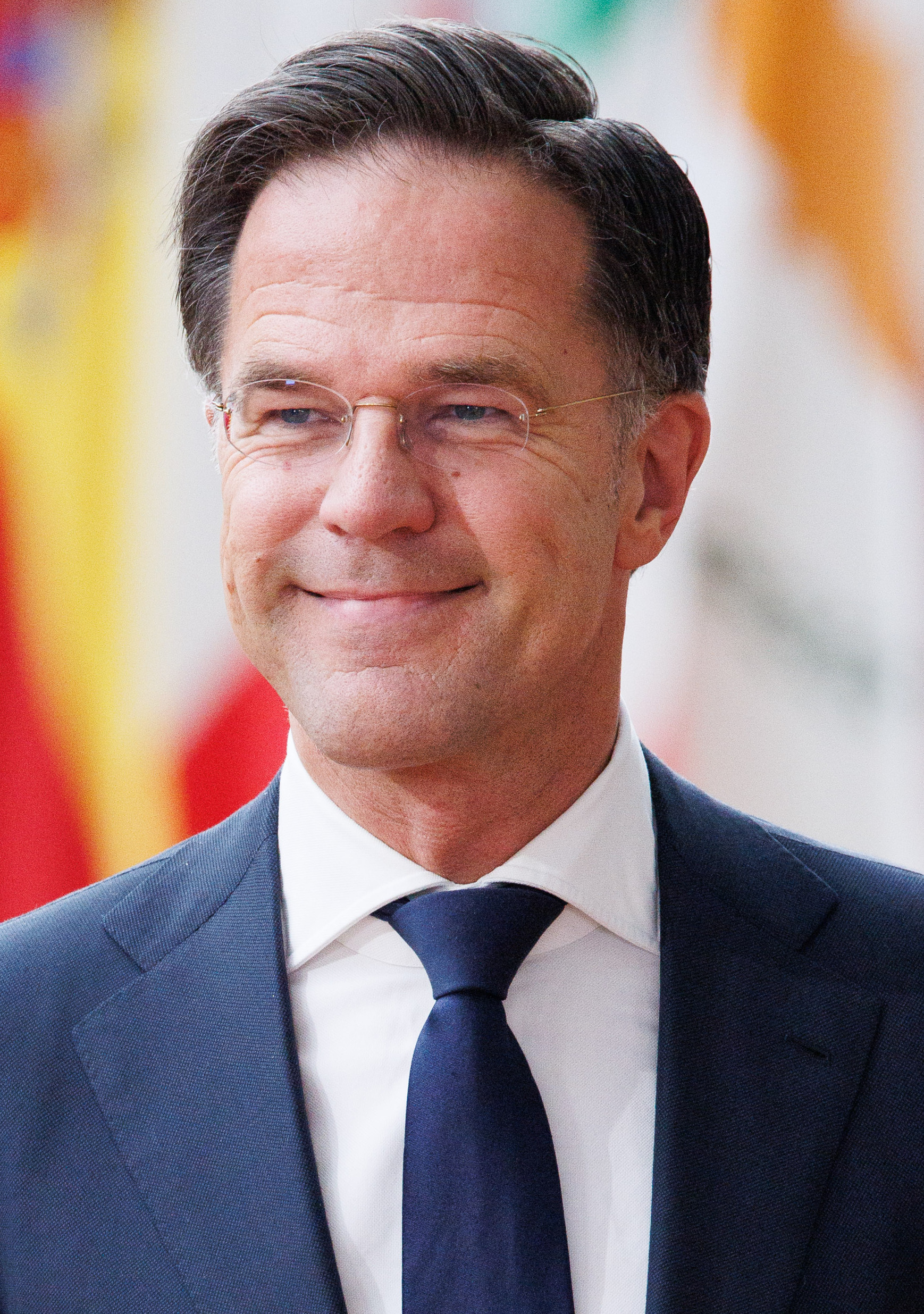
Mark Rutte, leader from 2006 until 2023 and Prime Minister of the Netherlands from 2010 until 2024

In 2006, the party lost a considerable number of seats in the municipal elections, prompting parliamentary leader Van Aartsen to step down. Willibrord van Beek was subsequently appointed parliamentary leader ad interim. In the subsequent party leadership election Mark Rutte was elected as the leader, defeating Rita Verdonk and Jelleke Veenendaal.

The general election of 2006 did not start off well for the VVD: Mark Rutte was criticised by his own parliamentary party for being invisible in the campaign, and he was unable to break the attention away from the duel between then-Prime Minister Jan Peter Balkenende of the Christian democrats and Wouter Bos of the Labour Party. However, the VVD's campaign started relatively late. The election polls showed losses for the VVD; the former VVD deputy Prime Minister Hans Wiegel blamed a poor VVD campaign for this, caused by the heavily contested VVD leadership run-off between Mark Rutte and Rita Verdonk earlier in the year. Verdonk had her eyes on the deputy-minister post, while cabinet posts are normally decided upon by the political leader of the VVD.

On election day, the party received enough votes for twenty-two seats, a loss of six seats. When the official election results were announced on Monday 27 November 2006, preferential votes became known as well, showing that Rita Verdonk, the second candidate on the list, had obtained more votes than the VVD's lead candidate, Mark Rutte. Rutte had received 553,200 votes, while Verdonk had received 620,555. This led Verdonk to call for a party commission that would investigate the party leadership position, as a consequence of the situation of her obtaining more votes in the general election than Rutte, creating a short-lived crisis in the party. A crisis was averted when Rutte called for an ultimatum on his leadership, which Verdonk had to reconcile to, by rejecting her proposal for a party commission. During 2007, signs of VVD infighting continued to play in the media. In June 2007, the former VVD minister Dekker presented a report on the previous election, showing that the VVD lacked clear leadership roles, however the report did not single out individuals for blame for the party's losses.

After Verdonk renewed her criticism of the party in September 2007, she was expelled from the parliamentary faction, and subsequently relinquished her membership of the party, after reconciliation attempts had proven futile. Verdonk started her own political movement, Proud of the Netherlands, subsequently. In opinion polls held after Verdonk's exit, the VVD was set to lose close to ten parliamentary seats in the next election.

After the 2010 general election the VVD became the largest party with 31 seats and was the senior party in a centre-right minority First Rutte cabinet with the Christian Democratic Appeal supported by the Party for Freedom (PVV) of Geert Wilders to obtain a majority. Rutte was sworn in as Prime Minister on 21 October 2010. Not only was it the first time that the VVD had led a government, but it was the first liberal-led government in 92 years. However, on 21 April 2012, after failed negotiations with the PVV on renewed budget cuts, the government became unstable and Mark Rutte deemed it likely that a new election would be held in 2012. On election day, 12 September 2012, the VVD remained the largest party in parliament, winning 41 seats, a gain of 10 seats.

After the 2012 general election, the VVD entered into a ruling coalition with the Labour Party as its junior coalition partner. This coalition lasted a full term, but lost its majority at the 2017 election; the VVD itself lost eight seats, though remained the largest party with 33. Rutte became Prime Minister again, forming a centre-right green cabinet with the Christian Democratic Appeal, Democrats 66 and the Christian Union. In March 2021, VVD was the winner of the general election, securing 34 out of 150 seats. Prime Minister Mark Rutte, in power since 2010, formed his fourth VVD-led coalition.

=== 2023–present: Yeşilgöz ===
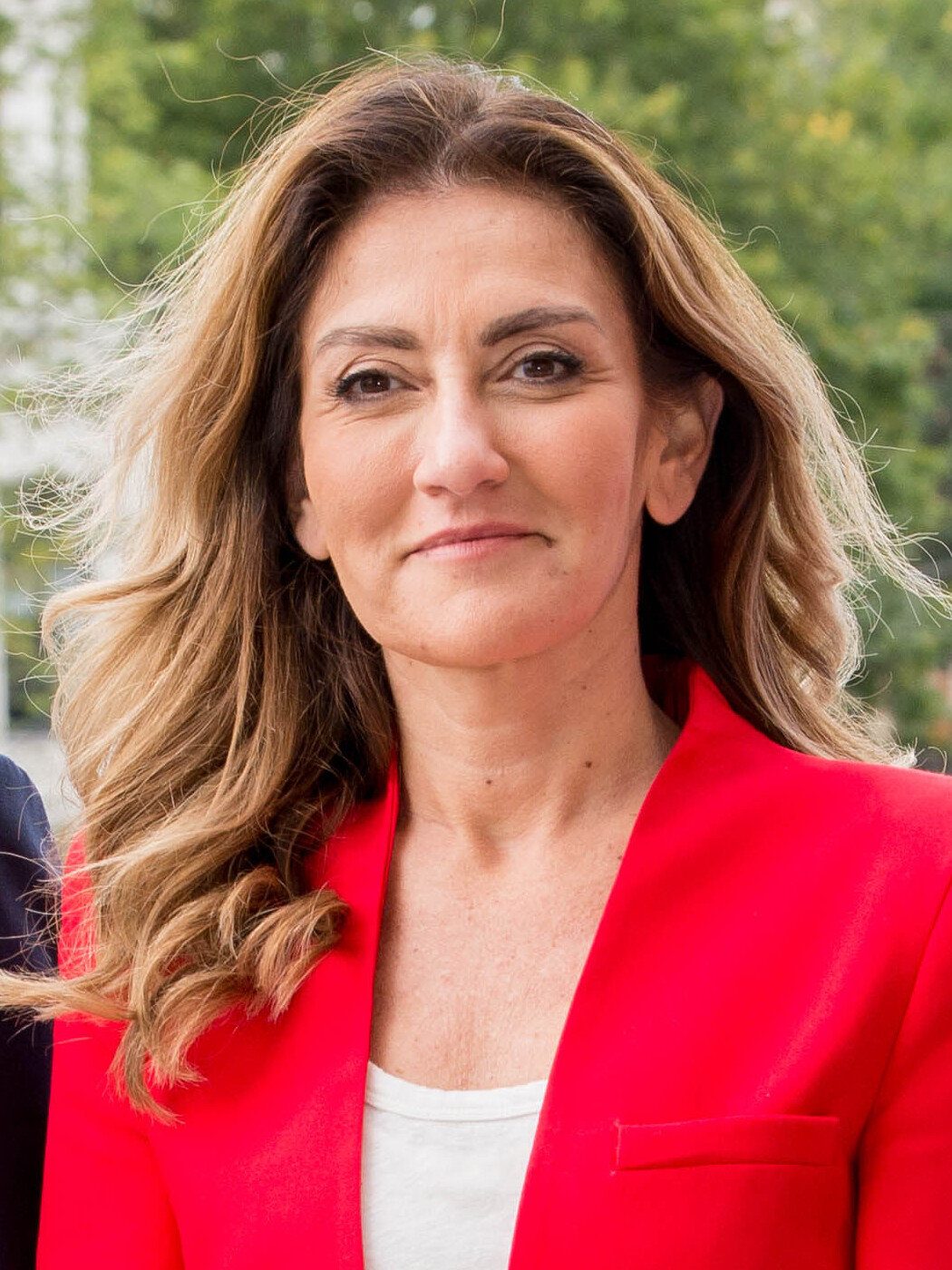
Dilan Yeşilgöz, party leader since 2023

After the fourth Rutte cabinet broke down due to disagreements over migration policy, a new election was called for 22 November 2023. Rutte announced that he would step down as leader of the VVD. Dilan Yeşilgöz became the new leader of the party in August 2023 after running unopposed in the leadership election.

Following the 2023 general election, the VVD was reduced to 24 seats in the House of Representatives. It entered formation talks with the Party for Freedom, the election winner, and the new parties New Social Contract and Farmer–Citizen Movement, leading to the right-wing Schoof cabinet.

== Ideology and policies ==
Academic sources describe the VVD as conservative-liberal, liberal-conservative, and conservative. It was also described as classical liberal and libertarian (Note: Multiple sources: "Dutch minister wins confidence vote". Al Jazeera English. 29 June 2006.; Sterling, Toby (18 May 2006). "Dutch forced to rethink decision on Somali-born MP". The Guardian. Amsterdam.; "Dutch government stands down". Irish Examiner. 30 June 2006.; Sterling, Toby (31 August 2012). "Dutch populist leader takes aim at EU and flops". Associated Press (via Yahoo! News).) by sources between 2006 and 2012.

The VVD describes itself as a party founded on a liberal philosophy. Traditionally, the party is the most ardent supporter of 'free markets' of all Dutch political parties, promoting political, economic liberalism, classical liberalism, and cultural liberalism. In contrast to this, it has helped build the welfare state since 1945. After 1971, the party became more populist, although some conservative liberal elements remain.

=== Liberal Manifesto ===
The principles of the People's Party for Freedom and Democracy were outlined in the "Liberal Manifesto" (Dutch: Liberaal Manifest) and latterly the election programmes. The Liberal Manifesto was a general outlook on the direction of the party would like to mirror itself and is an extension of the party's foundational principles. The election programmes are more oriented to practical politics, for example, winning the elections on-the-day and by any means possible. The last Liberal Manifesto of the VVD was published in September 2005. It developed a broad outline around the themes of democracy, security, freedom and citizenship, along with a vision of the future of party's internal structure. Below some of the points from the Manifesto are presented:

==== Democracy ====
- The Manifesto calls for a directly elected Prime Minister, whereby voters could express their preference on the ballot.
- The idea of (advisory) referendums is not supported by the party.
- Mayors should be directly elected by the people.
- Commitment to the four freedoms of the European Single Market.

==== Security ====
- A common policy on defence and security in the European Union is called for.

==== Freedom ====
- The principle of non-discrimination should be given more importance than the exercise of religion.
- "Social rights" are to be continued. These are not simply rights, but they also create obligations.
- Euthanasia is part of a person's right to self-determination.
- Commitment to an open economy, with a "regulated free-market", including patents.
- Support for the freedom of contract. No right for workers to enter into nationally binding collective bargaining agreements.

==== Citizenship ====
- Minimise the option of dual citizenship.
- Social security should only be fully open for Dutch nationals. Migrants would have to integrate in order to become citizens.

=== Migration ===
The VVD has supported the free movement of goods and people within the European single market, and it has historically opposed limits to labour migration. Since the early 2020s, the party has argued in favour of reducing the reliance of the Dutch economy on unskilled foreign labour.

=== Policy overview ===
- Economy and Finance
  - Small government
  - Laissez-faire
  - Tax reductions
  - Market economy
  - Balanced budget
- Government and Social Affairs
  - Deregulation
  - Separation of church and state
  - Minimise multiple citizenship
  - Emancipation
  - Same-sex marriage
  - Cultural Assimilation
  - Sober care of refugees
- Foreign policy and Law
  - Pro-Europeanism
  - Internationalism
  - Multilateralism
  - Mandatory sentencing
  - Anti-squatting
  - Distinction between soft drugs and hard drugs
- Health
  - Universal health care
  - Expansion of the euthanasia policy
  - Pro-choice

== Election results ==
=== House of Representatives ===
Election	Lead candidate	List	Votes	%	Seats	+/–	Government
1948	Pieter Oud	List	391,908	7.9	8 / 100	New	Coalition
1952	Pieter Oud	List	470,820	8.8	9 / 100	▲1	Opposition
1956	Pieter Oud	List	502,325	8.7	9 / 100	Steady	Opposition
1956	Pieter Oud	List	502,325	8.7	13 / 150	▲4	Opposition
1959	Pieter Oud	List	732,658	12.2	19 / 150	▲6	Coalition
1963	Edzo Toxopeus	List	643,839	10.2	16 / 150	▼3	Coalition
1967	Edzo Toxopeus	List	738,202	10.7	17 / 150	▲1	Coalition
1971	Molly Geertsema	List	653,092	10.3	16 / 150	▼1	Coalition
1972	Hans Wiegel	List	1,068,375	14.4	22 / 150	▲6	Opposition
1977	Hans Wiegel	List	1,492,689	17.0	28 / 150	▲6	Coalition
1981	Hans Wiegel	List	1,504,293	17.3	26 / 150	▼2	Opposition
1982	Ed Nijpels	List	1,897,986	23.1	36 / 150	▲10	Coalition
1986	Ed Nijpels	List	1,595,377	17.4	27 / 150	▼9	Coalition
1989	Joris Voorhoeve	List	1,295,402	14.6	22 / 150	▼5	Opposition
1994	Frits Bolkestein	List	1,792,401	20.0	31 / 150	▲9	Coalition
1998	Frits Bolkestein	List	2,124,971	24.7	38 / 150	▲7	Coalition
2002	Hans Dijkstal	List	1,466,722	15.4	24 / 150	▼14	Coalition
2003	Gerrit Zalm	List	1,728,707	17.9	28 / 150	▲4	Coalition
2006	Mark Rutte	List	1,443,312	14.7	22 / 150	▼6	Opposition
2010	Mark Rutte	List	1,929,575	20.5	31 / 150	▲9	Coalition
2012	Mark Rutte	List	2,504,948	26.6	41 / 150	▲10	Coalition
2017	Mark Rutte	List	2,238,351	21.3	33 / 150	▼8	Coalition
2021	Mark Rutte	List	2,276,514	21.9	34 / 150	▲1	Coalition
2023	Dilan Yeşilgöz	List	1,589,519	15.2	24 / 150	▼10	Coalition
2025	Dilan Yeşilgöz	List	1,505,829	14.2	22 / 150	▼2	Coalition

=== Senate ===
Election	Lead candidate	List	Votes	Weight	%	Seats	+/–
1948		List				3 / 50	New
1951		List				4 / 50	▲1
1952		List				4 / 50	Steady
1955		List				4 / 50	Steady
Apr 1956		List				4 / 75	Steady
Oct 1956		List				7 / 75	▲3
1960		List				8 / 75	▲1
1963		List				7 / 75	▼1
1966		List				8 / 75	▲1
1969		List				8 / 75	Steady
1971		List				8 / 75	Steady
1974		List				12 / 75	▲4
1977		List				15 / 75	▲3
1980		List				13 / 75	▼2
1981		List				12 / 75	▼1
1983	Guus Zoutendijk	List				17 / 75	▲5
1986		List				16 / 75	▼1
1987	David Luteijn	List				12 / 75	▼4
1991	David Luteijn	List				12 / 75	Steady
1995	Frits Korthals Altes	List				23 / 75	▲11
1999	Nicoline van den Broek-Laman Trip	List		39,809	25,3	19 / 75	▼4
2003	Nicoline van den Broek-Laman Trip	List		31,026	19,2	15 / 75	▼4
2007	Uri Rosenthal	List		31,360	19,2	14 / 75	▼1
2011	Loek Hermans	List	111	34,590	20.83	16 / 75	▲2
2015	Loek Hermans	List	90	28,523	16.87	13 / 75	▼3
2019	Annemarie Jorritsma	List	78	26,157	15.11	12 / 75	▼1
2023	Edith Schippers	List	67	22,194	12.40	10 / 75	▼2

=== European Parliament ===
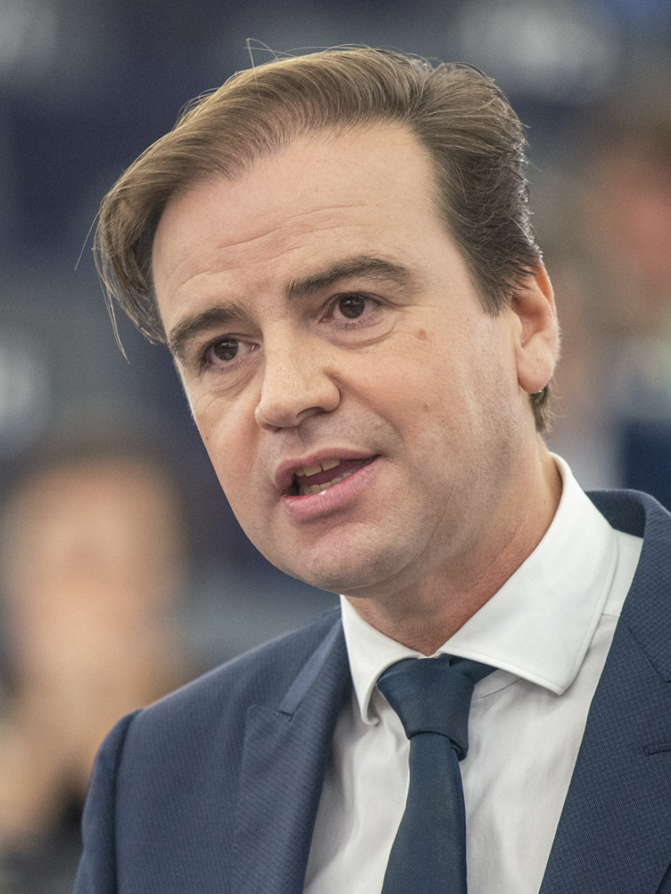
Malik Azmani, leader in the European Parliament since 2019

Election	List	Votes	%	Seats	+/–	EP Group
1979	List	914,787	16.14	4 / 25	New	LD
1984	List	1,002,685	18.93	5 / 25	▲1	LDR
1989	List	714,745	13.63	3 / 25	▼2	LDR
1994	List	740,443	17.91	6 / 31	▲3	ELDR
1999	List	698,050	19.69	6 / 31	0	ELDR
2004	List	629,198	13.20	4 / 27	▼2	ALDE
2009	List	518,643	11.39	3 / 25	▼1	ALDE
2009	List	518,643	11.39	3 / 26	0	ALDE
2014	List	571,176	12.02	3 / 26	0	ALDE
2019	List	805,100	14.64	4 / 26	▲1	RE
2019	List	805,100	14.64	5 / 29	▲1	RE
2024	List	707,141	11.35	4 / 31	▼1	RE

== Representation ==
=== Representation in EU institutions ===
In the European Committee of the Regions, VVD sits in the Renew Europe CoR Group, with two full and three alternate members for the 2025–2030 mandate. Arthur van Dijk is a bureau member of the Renew Europe CoR group and Martijn van Gruijthuijsen is coordinator for the ECON Commission.

== Electorate ==
Historically, the VVD electorate consisted mainly of secular middle-class and upper-class voters, with a strong support from entrepreneurs. Under the leadership of Wiegel, the VVD started to expand its appeal to working class voters.

== Organisation ==
=== Leadership ===
- Parliamentary leaders in the Senate
  - Anthonie Nicolaas Molenaar (24 January 1948 – 21 November 1958)
  - Harm van Riel (23 December 1958 – 3 June 1976)
  - Haya van Someren (3 June 1976 – 12 November 1980)
  - Guus Zoutendijk (25 November 1980 – 23 June 1987)
  - David Luteijn (23 June 1987 – 13 June 1995)
  - Frits Korthals Altes (13 June 1995 – 11 March 1997)
  - Leendert Ginjaar (11 March 1997 – 14 September 1999)
  - Nicoline van den Broek (14 September 1999 – 1 May 2005)
  - Uri Rosenthal (1 May 2005 – 14 October 2010)
  - Fred de Graaf (14 October 2010 – 22 February 2011)
  - Loek Hermans (22 February 2011 – 3 November 2015)
  - Helmi Huijbregts-Schiedon (3 November 2015 – 24 November 2015)
  - Annemarie Jorritsma (24 November 2015 – 13 June 2023)
  - Edith Schippers (13 June 2023 – 31 December 2024)
  - Tanja Klip-Martin (since 1 January 2025)
- Parliamentary leaders in the House of Representatives
  - Pieter Oud (27 July 1948 – 16 May 1963)
  - Roelof Zegering Hadders (16 May 1963 – 2 July 1963)
  - Edzo Toxopeus (2 July 1963 – 24 July 1963)
  - Molly Geertsema (24 July 1963 – 12 March 1966)
  - Edzo Toxopeus (12 March 1966 – 1 October 1969)
  - Molly Geertsema (1 October 1969 – 6 July 1971)
  - Hans Wiegel (6 July 1971 – 19 December 1977)
  - Koos Rietkerk (19 December 1977 – 25 Augustus 1981)
  - Hans Wiegel (25 Augustus 1981 – 20 April 1982)
  - Ed Nijpels (20 April 1982 – 9 July 1986)
  - Joris Voorhoeve (9 July 1986 – 30 April 1990)
  - Frits Bolkestein (30 April 1990 – 30 July 1998)
  - Hans Dijkstal (30 July 1998 – 23 May 2002)
  - Gerrit Zalm (23 May 2002 – 27 May 2003)
  - Jozias van Aartsen (27 May 2003 – 8 March 2006)
  - Willibrord van Beek (8 March 2006 – 29 June 2006)
  - Mark Rutte (29 June 2006 – 8 October 2010)
  - Stef Blok (8 October 2010 – 20 September 2012)
  - Mark Rutte (20 September 2012 – 1 November 2012)
  - Halbe Zijlstra (1 November 2012 – 23 March 2017)
  - Mark Rutte (23 March 2017 – 13 October 2017)
  - Halbe Zijlstra (13 October 2017 – 25 October 2017)
  - Klaas Dijkhoff (25 October 2017 – 31 March 2021)
  - Mark Rutte (31 March 2021 – 10 January 2022)
  - Sophie Hermans (11 January 2022 – 9 December 2023)
  - Dilan Yeşilgöz (9 December 2023 – 23 February 2026)
  - Ruben Brekelmans (since 23 February 2026)

=== Organisational structure ===
The highest organ of the VVD is the General Assembly, in which all members present have a single vote. It convenes usually twice every year. It appoints the party board and decides on the party programme.

The order of the First Chamber, Second Chamber and European Parliament candidates list is decided by a referendum under all members voting by internet, phone or mail. If contested, the lead candidate of a candidates lists is appointed in a separate referendum in advance. Since 2002 the General Assembly can call for a referendum on other subjects too.

About 90 members elected by the members in meetings of the regional branches form the Party Council, which advises the Party Board in the months that the General Assembly does not convene. This is an important forum within the party. The party board handles the daily affairs of the party.

=== Linked organisations ===
The independent youth organisation that has a partnership agreement with the VVD is the Youth Organisation Freedom and Democracy (Dutch: Jongeren Organisatie Vrijheid en Democratie, JOVD), which is a member of the Liberal Youth Movement of the European Union and the International Federation of Liberal and Radical Youth.

The education institute of the VVD is the Haya van Someren Foundation. The Telders Foundation is the party's scientific institute and publishes the magazine Liberaal Reveil every two months. The party published the magazine Liber bi-monthly.

=== International organisations ===
The VVD is a member of the Alliance of Liberals and Democrats for Europe Party and Liberal International.

The VVD participates in the Netherlands Institute for Multiparty Democracy, a democracy assistance organisation of seven Dutch political parties.

== See also ==
- Liberal democracy
- Liberal parties by country
- Liberalism in the Netherlands
- List of liberal theorists
