= List of members of the House of Representatives of the Netherlands for the Communist Party of the Netherlands =

The Communist Party of the Netherlands (CPN), known as the Communist Party Holland between 1919 and 1935, was represented in the Dutch House of Representatives from 1919 to 1986. This is a list of all members of the House of Representatives for the CPN/CPH from 1918 to 1986.

== List ==
List of members of the House of Representatives of the Netherlands for the Communist Party of the Netherlands
Member	Term start	Term end	Ref.
Marcus Bakker	7 November 1956	15 September 1982	
Cor Borst	11 April 1946	14 July 1952	
Cor Borst	13 December 1956	31 March 1962	
Ina Brouwer	10 June 1981	2 June 1986	
Frits Dragstra	7 December 1972	7 June 1977	
Roestam Effendi	4 July 1933	18 January 1946	
Marius Ernsting	7 September 1983	2 June 1986	
Evelien Eshuis	16 September 1982	2 June 1986	
Henk Gortzak	27 July 1948	14 April 1958 (Note: Left the CPN on 14 April 1958, continued as part of the Groep Gortzak)	
Paul de Groot	20 November 1945	31 January 1966	
Jan Haken	4 June 1946	2 July 1956	
Huub Hermans	13 August 1948	17 August 1951	
Henk Hoekstra	5 June 1963	1 December 1977	
Jan Hoogcarspel	4 June 1946	14 July 1952	
Tjalle Jager	11 April 1962	21 February 1967	
Dries Koenen	4 June 1946	26 July 1948	
Wim Kremer	23 February 1967	6 December 1972	
Willy Kruyt	1 April 1921 (Note: Elected in the 1918 Dutch general election for the League of Christian Socialists, joined the CPH in 1921)	24 July 1922	
André de Leeuw	6 December 1972	7 June 1977	
Rie Lips-Odinot	11 October 1951	2 July 1956	
Rie Lips-Odinot	6 November 1956	14 April 1958	
Fré Meis	11 May 1971	7 June 1977	
Annie van Ommeren-Averink	8 February 1966	21 February 1967	
Willem van Ravesteyn	17 September 1918	14 September 1925	
Frits Reuter	15 July 1952	22 February 1958	
Kees Schalker	4 July 1933	7 June 1937	
Wim van het Schip	23 February 1967	7 June 1977	
Gijs Schreuders	2 February 1982	5 September 1983	
Jef Spijkers	4 June 1946	26 July 1948	
Louis de Visser	15 September 1925	15 September 1941	
Gerben Wagenaar	20 November 1945	14 April 1958	
David Wijnkoop	17 September 1918	14 September 1925	
David Wijnkoop	17 September 1930	6 May 1941	
Brecht Willemse	4 June 1946	26 July 1948	
Joop Wolff	23 February 1967	7 June 1977	
Joop Wolff	22 December 1977	21 January 1982	
