= Unity Trade Union Federation =

Dutch former trade union confederation

- Eenheidsvakcentrale (EVC)
- Predecessor: Eenheidsvakbeweging (1943-1944)
- Successor: Eenheidsvakcentrale '58 (1958-1960); Center of Propaganda for Unity and Class Struggle in the Labor Movement (from 1960)
- Formation: 1945
- Dissolved: 1 August 1964
- Members: 177,000 (1946); 133,000 (1947) ca. 20,000 (1958)
- Key people: Berend Blokzijl (1945-1952); Frits Reuter (1952-1959); Bertus Brandsen (1949-1959)
- Affiliations: World Federation of Trade Unions

The Unity Trade Union Federation (Dutch: Eenheidsvakcentrale, EVC) was a Dutch trade union federation. Founded in 1945 and closely linked to the Communist Party of the Netherlands (CPN), the EVC gained significant popularity in the years following World War II, having 160,000-180,000 members during its peak shortly after the war. Due to the rise of anti-communist sentiment during the Cold War, the EVC declined significantly in popularity, and was hindered by attempts from CPN leader Paul de Groot to merge it with the moderate Dutch Confederation of Trade Unions. Following significant internal conflicts, the EVC split into two in 1958, with a faction loyal to the CPN being abolished as a trade union federation in 1960, and the remaining independent EVC being dissolved in 1964. The Unity Trade Union Federation was a member of the World Federation of Trade Unions.

== History ==
The idea for a communist trade union federation had been raised during World War II by Wim van Exter, a metalworker from Amsterdam who began publishing an illegal newspaper in 1943 arguing for a united front of trade unionists, including social democrats. In 1944, underground CPN leader Jaap Brandenburg tasked Van Exter with traveling around the Netherlands to instruct party members on trade union affairs, and that same year Van Exter helped found a mineworkers' union in liberated Limburg, though he was removed from leadership after his communist leanings became known. In 1945, the Catholic Church in Limburg banned Catholics from joining communist unions entirely, and the mineworkers' union did not become a part of the Unity Trade Union Federation upon its founding.

The Unity Trade Union Federation (EVC) was officially founded shortly after the end of World War II. Its first chairman was Berend Blokzijl, an instrument maker from a social democratic background who had become a communist during World War II, but initially hid his political leanings. In 1946, the EVC had 177,000 members, making it the second largest trade union federation behind the Dutch Confederation of Trade Unions (NVV). A year later, its membership had declined to around 130,000.

Immediately after its founding, efforts began to merge the EVC with the NVV to form a united socialist union federation. This faced backlash from much of the union's membership, where in some areas many had been part of the National Labor Secretariat before World War II, and who frequently organized wildcat strikes without the consent of union leadership. The CPN in contrast, sought to pursue a policy of accommodation with the political establishment, and urged the EVC's leadership to minimize strike activity.

Unity Trade Union Federation meeting in Amsterdam, 1946

An internal opposition group was organized under Rotterdam municipal councilor Toon van de Berg. In early 1946, the NVV agreed to merger talks despite their misgivings about the EVC's communist orientation and its militant membership. At a national congress in July that year a large minority of members voted against a merger with the NVV. Talks with the NVV stalled in 1947 after EVC chairman Blokzijl publicly joined the CPN, leading to the EVC becoming widely viewed as little more than a front organization of the CPN. In March, the NVV broke off talks entirely, after which the EVC gradually became marginalized. Several splits followed, including the road workers union in 1947 and the entire Rotterdam EVC branch in 1948, which became Independent League of Industrial Organizations led by Toon van de Berg and would play an important role in the Port of Rotterdam until the 1990s.

In 1951, the Dutch government banned its employees from EVC membership. In 1956, 15 percent of its members left after EVC leadership spoke out in support of the Soviet invasion of Hungary.

Throughout the 1950s, the EVC remained the largest union federation in Amsterdam, most notably among dockworkers, builders, and municipal workers. Other EVC strongholds included the Amsterdam metal industry, the textile industry in Twente and the port of Rotterdam. While the EVC ceased publishing its membership numbers in 1951, historian Rob Hartmans estimates its membership in 1958 at around 20,000.

After the death of Joseph Stalin, Paul de Groot attempted to reconcile with the NVV and increase his control within the EVC, replacing Berend Blokzijl as chairman with Frits Reuter and appointing others who would be more loyal to him personally. In 1955, CPN party leadership passed a resolution during its seventeenth national congress urging the EVC to seek closer ties with the NVV, which was met by disappointment among EVC members. A year later, De Groot attempted to propose dissolving the EVC at a party congress, but was reprimanded by the Soviet Union, who disapproved of his merger idea.

De Groot's desire for dissolving the EVC ran into opposition from chairperson Frits Reuter and secretary-general Bertus Brandsen, who became vocal members of the internal opposition in the CPN. They were supported by other CPN figures, including Henk Gortzak, Gerben Wagenaar, and Rie Lips-Odinot.

In 1957, De Groot criticized Reuter and Brandsen for their "abnormal" criticism of the party, and after a verbal altercation between the two De Groot drew up a resolution condemning Brandsen for discussing internal CPN affairs within the EVC secretariat. After the conflict was publicized in major Dutch newspapers with the assistance of the Binnenlandse Veiligheidsdienst (BVD), the conflict temporarily subsided, but in September De Groot accused the two EVC leaders of wanting to depose him. When in December De Groot issued declarations harshly criticizing Brandsen, twelve local EVC leaders resigned from the CPN. In March 1958, Brandsen and Reuter were expelled from the CPN, despite efforts from the EVC to appeal to the World Federation of Trade Unions, and De Groot loyalists were installed as the EVC's new leaders.

In June 1958, loyalists to the CPN founded the EVC'58, which retained the ultimate goal of uniting with the NVV. This organization had around 18,000 members in 1960, when it was reformed into the Center of Propaganda for Unity and Class Struggle in the Labor Movement (Centrum van propaganda voor eenheid en klassenstrijd in de vakbeweging), which did not see itself as an independent union federation but rather as a future internal pressure group within the NVV. The remaining Unity Trade Union Federation quickly became a very marginal force, with an estimated membership of 3,000. The EVC was officially dissolved on 1 August 1964.

== Organization ==
The Unity Trade Union Federation was nominally independent, and initially drew membership from a wide variety of groups, including many non-communists. Some of its initial members also had syndicalist ideological leanings. The Unity Trade Union Federation's structure was theoretically decentralized, composed of sectoral unions who would have a more individual say over their respective industries. The EVC was led by a National Council, dominated by CPN members. From 1948, members of the EVC leadership were hand-picked by CPN leader Paul de Groot on loyalty to the CPN and him personally. The EVC was a member of the World Federation of Trade Unions.

=== Chairpeople ===
- Berend Blokzijl (1945-1952)
- Frits Reuter (1952-1959)
- G. Groot Roessink (from 1959)

== Affiliated unions ==
This is a list of unions which were at one time affiliated with the EVC.

Union	Abbreviation	Notes
General Union of Workers in the Wood and Furniture Industry	AHBM	
General Industrial Union of Transport Workers	ABT	
General Union of Workers in the Tobacco Industry	ABTI	Merged into Chevofa in 1952.
General Industrial Union of Transport Personnel	ABV	
General Dutch Union for Hotel Personnel	ANBH	
General Dutch Union of Cinema and Theatre Personnel	ANBT	Dissolved ca. 1954.
General Dutch Union of Seafarers	ANBZ	Merged into the ABT in 1958.
General Dutch Union for Workers in the Textile and Clothes Industry	ATEK	
Union of Workers in the Trade, Banking and Insurance Industry	BHBV	
Union for Agricultural and Dairy Workers	BLZ	
Union for Dutch Government Personnel	BNOP	
General Union of Workers in the Chemical, Food and Industrial Companies	Chevofa	
Union of Workers in the Graphic and Paper Industry	Grafische	
Union of Workers in the Metal Industry and Related Sectors	De Metaal	

After the EVC's split with the CPN in 1958, only parts of the ABT, ABV, BNOP, Chevofa and De Metaal unions remained with the EVC, the others joining the EVC'58.

== Bibliography ==
- Hartmans, Rob (2024-12-12). Rode kameraden (in Dutch). Utrecht: Omniboek. ISBN 9789401916653.
- Stutje, Jan Willem (2000). De man die de weg wees: leven en werk van Paul de Groot 1899-1986. Amsterdam: Bezige Bij. ISBN 978-90-234-3908-0.
