= Ben Polak (politician) =

Dutch doctor and politician (1913–1993)

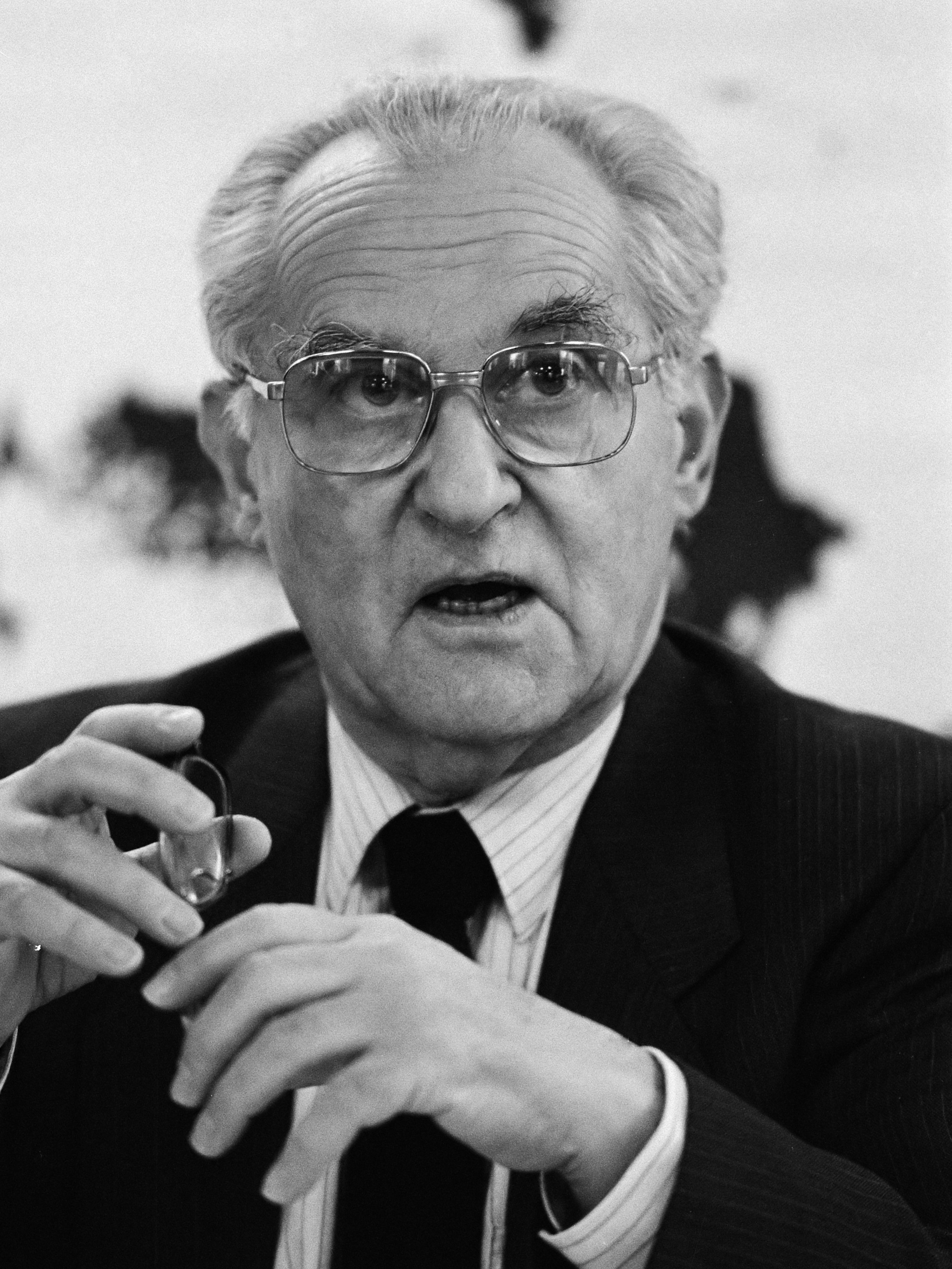
- Ben Polak in 1986

Member of the Senate
- In office 6 November 1956 – 20 September 1960

Member of the Provincial Council of North Holland
- In office 19 June 1946 – 10 March 1953

Personal details
- Born: Benjamin Sally Polak; 12 September 1913 Nijmegen, Netherlands
- Died: 24 July 1993 (aged 79) Amsterdam, Netherlands
- Party: CPN (1932 - March 1953; November 1953 - 1991)
- Spouse(s): Petronella Everdina Eldering (m. 1940; div. 1945) Aletta Bronsing (m. 1947; div. 1950) Petronella Everdina Eldering (m. 1950; div. 1969) Mireille Smit (m. 1977)
- Children: 2
- Education: Leiden University (degree in medicine); University of Amsterdam (medical examination)

Benjamin Sally "Ben" Polak (12 September 1913 – 24 July 1993) was a Dutch medical doctor and politician. A member of the Communist Party of the Netherlands (CPN), he served as alderman of Amsterdam from 1946 until being forced to resign in 1948, and as a member of the Dutch Senate from 1956 to 1960. Polak was temporarily expelled from the CPN in 1953 due to him questioning the Doctors' Plot, but was let back into the party the same year after the supposed plot was proven false. He was also a practicing physician, who became a professor of medicine at the University of Amsterdam in 1977.

== Early life ==
Ben Polak was born on 12 September 1913 in Nijmegen to Mozes Samson Polak, an Orthodox Jewish cantor, and Goldina van der Hove, a socialist. His father died when he was 12, and the family moved to The Hague, where his mother raised him in a more liberal manner and where he attended secondary school. In 1932, Polak began studying medicine at Leiden University, where he became involved in the Zionist student movement. That same year, he joined the Communist Party Holland (from 1935 known as the Communist Party of the Netherlands; CPN), along with the left wing of the local Zionist student organisation. In 1939 he took his doctor's exam and began attending the University of Amsterdam.

During World War II, Polak became a part of the Dutch resistance, joining a sabotage group and assisting people in hiding. Several important resistance groups including the illegal CPN leadership met at his house in the Rivierenbuurt, and a leftist illegal newspaper was produced there. Polak graduated as a medical doctor from the University of Amsterdam on 9 July 1941, the last Jewish person to do so for the duration of the war. His marriage to a non-Jewish woman allowed him more freedom than other Jews had, and despite only being allowed to treat Jewish patients he regularly helped resistance members and people in hiding.

In 1943, Polak was arrested after encouraging a Jewish woman he had treated to flee, and was imprisoned in the Hollandsche Schouwburg where he was allowed to treat people. After a daring escape through a window in the roof, he spent the rest of the war in hiding.

== Post-war career ==
After the war, Polak resumed his medical practice and became a member of the Amsterdam municipal council in November 1945. Following a CPN victory in the 1946 local elections, he became an alderman, responsible for municipal companies. Around the 1948 Czechoslovak coup d'état, the CPN in Amsterdam, with Polak as one of its leadership, had spread pamphlets on 11 March 1948 for the establishment of "welfare committees" as part of a public campaign to protest the Marshall plan and the economic policy of the First Beel cabinet, which was seen as the prelude a communist coup d'état by other parties. Although a declaration the next day by Leen Seegers, the other CPN alderman, was able to mollify mayor Arnold d'Ailly who stuck to condemning the communists, others saw the reaction as too weak. Following a CPN campaign urging the Labour Party (PvdA) to follow the example of the Czechoslovak socialists instead of their current "reactionary" stance, a vote of no-confidence in Polak and Seegers was passed on 24 March, although both kept their seats, claiming the Amsterdam municipal council had no legal standing to remove them. Minister of Internal Affairs Petrus Johannes Witteman then led efforts to change legislation on municipal government, allowing municipal councils to fire aldermen, which was passed in July 1948. Polak was subsequently fired as alderman on 22 September 1948. Looking back in later years, Polak admitted that while he had enjoyed his work as alderman, he had not been able to change much, criticising the CPN's participation in local government as "reformist nonsense".

== Polak affair ==
Concerns within CPN leadership had existed for years after World War II over Polak's critical stance towards the party's "authoritarian" leadership and his first and third wife Pim Eldering's editorship of De Vrije Katheder, an independent leftist publication that published non-communist perspective, and who was expelled from the CPN in 1950. In early 1953, Polak had confessed his doubts about the Doctors' Plot to Esther Teeboom, a CPN colleague in the North Holland provincial council, who subsequently reported the conversation to Paul de Groot. On 3 March, Polak was ordered to appear before the CPN district leadership in Amsterdam, where he was interrogated about his connections to figures who had come into disrepute within the CPN, such as Daan Goulooze and Jan Romein. At an emergency meeting after the announcement of the death of Joseph Stalin on 6 March, the leadership of the CPN resolved to expel Polak from the party and force him to resign his political positions.

In an article in De Waarheid the next day, Polak was accused of "devious scheming" and of attempting to turn several Jewish party members against the party and the Soviet Union by spreading doubts about the veracity of the doctors' plot. On 10 March, Polak resigned from the Amsterdam municipal council and North Holland provincial council. CPN patients were asked to switch doctors, though some, such as CPN MP Henk Gortzak, refused to do so.

When after the death of Stalin the new Soviet government retracted its claims regarding the doctors' plot, the CPN was forced to revisit its previous decision, and Polak was rehabilitated and let back into the party in November 1953, with the leadership admitting that there had been no "traitorous behaviour" on the part of Polak. Polak was simultaneously forced to recognise that he had made "grave political errors" as a condition for his return.

== Later life ==
In 1956, Polak became a member of the Senate for the CPN on the suggestion of Gerben Wagenaar and Henk Gortzak. As a senator, he focused primarily on justice, social affairs, health, defence, and education. In 1960, he left the Senate, after which the CPN refused to pick up his party contribution, effectively sidelining Polak politically, though he would remain a communist for the rest of his life.

After his retirement from active politics, Polak began to focus on his medical practice. From 1959 to 1972, Polak operated a doctor's office at the Tweede Constantijn Huygensstraat 72, where he became known as a "fashion doctor" due to the many celebrities that he treated, though his patients came from all ranks of society. He became known as a progressive minded doctor, who performed controversial medical procedures including abortion and euthanasia. He paid special attention to survivors of World War II, helping them get social benefits and participating in several commissions to advance their interests in the 1980s.

Polak also became active academically, helping found an institute for educating general practitioners at the University of Amsterdam in 1969 and serving as an academic employee there until 1970, when he became an assistant professor (lector). In 1977, he became a full professor (hoogleraar) which he would remain until his retirement in 1984. Polak additionally participated in the leadership of a wide range of medical associations, including the Medical Committee North Vietnam from 1978 to 1988, the Royal Dutch Medical Association from 1976 to 1982, and the Vereniging tegen de Kwakzalverij. He served as chairman of the board of trustees of the newspaper Vrij Nederland from 1978 to 1988.

Ben Polak died on 24 July 1993 in Amsterdam.

== Personal life ==
Ben Polak was married four times to three different women, and had a reputation as a womanizer. In 1940, he married Petra "Pim" Eldering, the daughter of a Remonstrant preacher and a fellow CPN member, with whom he had two sons in 1940 and 1942. In 1947, the two divorced, and Polak married Letty Bronzing, but at the request of his sons Polak remarried Eldering in 1950. He divorced Eldering a second time in 1969, after which he married Mireille Smit in 1977.

== Bibliography ==
- Stutje, Jan Willem (2000). De man die de weg wees: leven en werk van Paul de Groot 1899-1986. Amsterdam: Bezige Bij. ISBN 978-90-234-3908-0.
