= Jaap Brandenburg =

Dutch politician and resistance fighter (1899-1957)

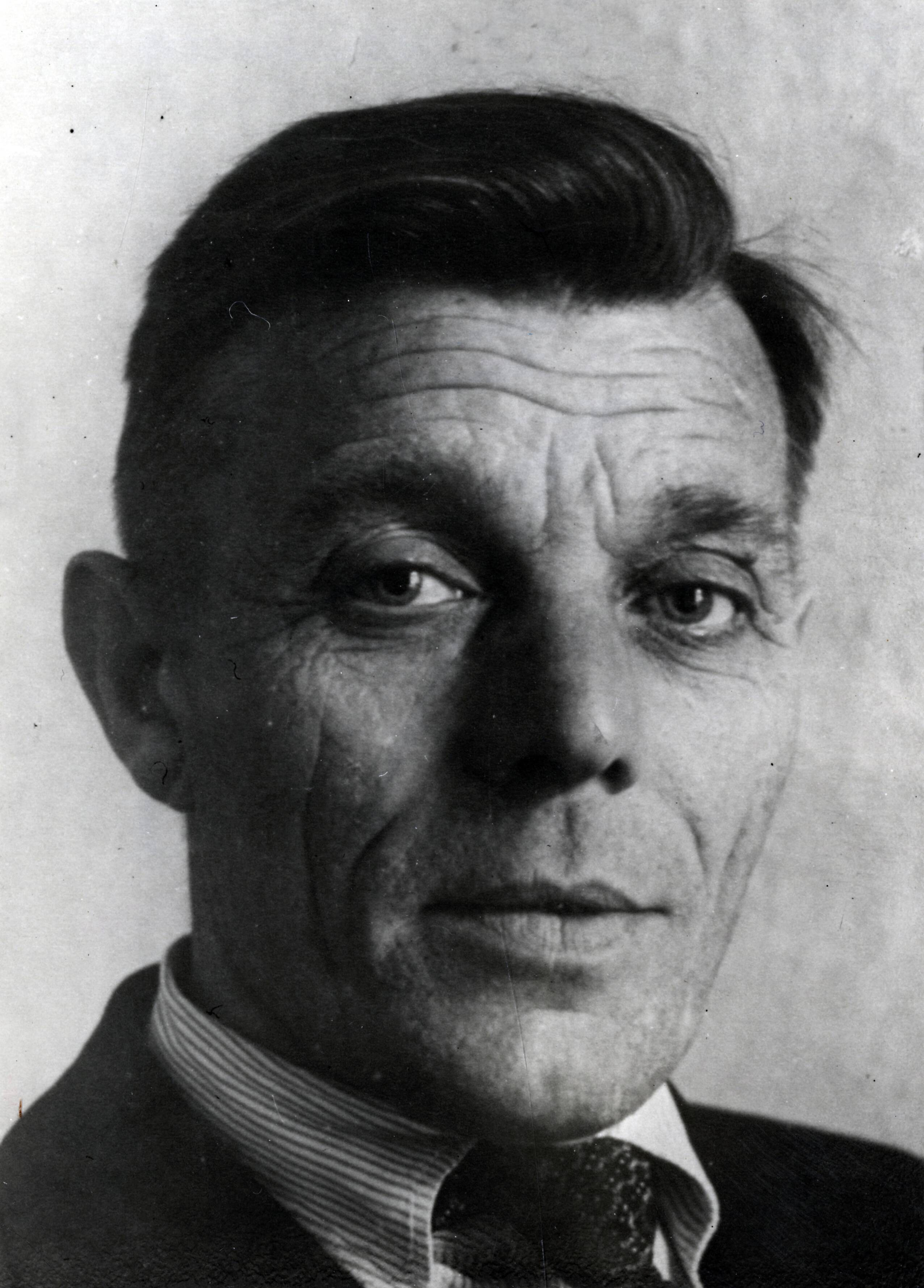
- Jaap Brandenburg in 1948

Member of the Senate
- In office 23 July 1946 – 6 November 1956

Personal details
- Born: Jacob Brandenburg; 22 August 1899 Amsterdam, Netherlands
- Died: 7 March 1957 (aged 57) Amsterdam, Netherlands
- Party: CPN
- Spouse: Wilhelmina Catharina van der Meijden (m. 1933)

Jacob "Jaap" Brandenburg (22 August 1899 – January 22, 1973) was a Dutch resistance fighter and politician. As a party instructor for the Communist Party of the Netherlands (CPN) in Amsterdam during World War II, he was one of the organisers of the 1941 February strike, and led the illegal CPN apparatus from 1943 to 1945. He was also a member of the Dutch Senate from 1946 to 1956.

== Early life ==
Jaap Brandenburg was born on 22 August 1899 as the son of Albertus Brandenburg (1860-1930) and Catharina Abbenes (1862-1913) in Amsterdam. He came from a family of nine children. At the age of twelve, he left school and went to work as a labourer. The early death of his mother tore the family apart, and Jaap moved in with a married brother.

In 1928, Brandenburg joined the Communist Party Holland, later renamed to the Communist Party of the Netherlands (CPN). In 1933, he married Wilhelmina van der Meijden (1908-1988); the marriage remained childless. He was active in the unemployed movement during the Great Depression and in the Jordaanoproer in 1934. Jaap became organizational secretary of the CPN's North Holland-Utrecht district. He proved to be a capable organizer, and in 1935 he was appointed political secretary of the Rotterdam district. Three years later, he became secretary for South Holland. At the party congress in 1938, he was elected to the CPN party executive. He remained stationed in South Holland until the German invasion in May 1940, after which he returned to Amsterdam with his wife.

== World War II ==
In June 1940, Jaap Brandenburg was commissioned by the CPN leadership to organize the underground CPN in Amsterdam. He led the transition to illegality; the publication, production, and distribution of the illegal communist newspaper De Waarheid; the fundraising for the CPN's solidarity funds (Sol Fund); and the strike actions in companies in the autumn of 1940, which formed the prelude to the February Strike of 1941.

Brandenburg, at that time district leader of the illegal CPN in Amsterdam, had witnessed the raids and mistreatment of Jews in the Jewish Quarter on February 22 and 23, 1941. He contacted Lou Jansen, Paul de Groot, and Jan Dieters of the national leadership of the illegal CPN. There had been plans for a general strike for some time, and due to the shocking events, the time now seemed ripe. In consultation with Frits Reuter and Bertus Brandsen of the Amsterdam CPN, preparations began to be made and the illegal party apparatus was mobilised. Jansen wrote the undated call for the strike, in which the CPN was not mentioned.

At the same time, individual CPN members Piet Nak and Willem Kraan took the initiative to start a strike and consulted with Brandenburg and Frits Reuter. After an initial failed attempt on February 24, a clandestine meeting was held that evening at the Noordermarkt with about 300 people, where Dirk van Nimwegen and Nak spoke and called for a general strike. Brandenburg was also present and the illegal CPN apparatus was activated to declare the strike the following day, February 25.

After the February Strike, Jaap Brandenburg became one of the most wanted CPN members, being held responsible for the illegal work in North Brabant and South Holland. Together with his wife, he went into hiding in Tilburg, posing as an elevator mechanic. His alias was "Tom". After the rounding up by the German Sicherheitsdienst of the first illegal party leadership in April 1943, and the second party leadership led by Jan Postma in November 1943, Brandenburg took over as CPN leader. Besides Brandenburg, the third CPN leadership consisted of Wim Puister and Frits Reuter (both responsible for organizational work), Anthoon Johan Koejemans, Friedl Baruch (both for De Waarheid), Bob Gillieron (for the solidarity fund), and Gerben Wagenaar (for armed resistance and sabotage via the Council of Resistance).

An attempt on his part to contact the CPN leader Paul de Groot, who was in hiding, failed, according to Brandenburg shortly after the war when De Groot's position was being questioned due to alleged "desertion". In July 1944, Brandenburg took part in the Grote Adviescommissie van de Illegaliteit (GAC) on behalf of De Waarheid, which was intended to serve as the general umbrella organization of the resistance and an advisory body to the government in London. At the time of the liberation in May 1945, he had returned to Amsterdam.

== Post-war career ==
After the liberation, Jaap Brandenburg was a member of the Nationale Advies Commissie. He was part of the National Bureau of the Truth Movement, as the CPN was called at that time. At the July Conference in 1945, he belonged to the group that campaigned for the re-establishment of the CPN. In 1946, he was re-elected to the party executive, of which he was a member until his death. From October 1945, he was a member of the Amsterdam City Council. In July 1946, he became a member of the Senate, where he served as parliamentary leader for the CPN from 1952 to 1956.

In 1951, he refused the King's Medal for Courage in the Cause of Freedom awarded to him. In November 1956, he was re-elected to the Senate, but he was already ill at that time and was therefore unable to assume office. Jaap Brandenburg died on 7 March 1957 in Amsterdam.

== Bibliography ==
- de Jong, Loe (1972). Het Koninkrijk der Nederlanden in de Tweede Wereldoorlog. Deel 4 – Mei '40 – maart '41 (2e band) (in Dutch). 's Gravenhage: Martinus Nijhoff.
- de Jong, Loe (1982). Het Koninkrijk der Nederlanden in de Tweede Wereldoorlog. Deel 10b – Het laatste jaar II, tweede helft (in Dutch). 's Gravenhage: Martinus Nijhoff.
- Mooij, Annet (2006). De strijd om de Februaristaking (in Dutch). Balans. ISBN 978-90-5018-768-8.
- Sijes, B. A. (1978). De Februari-staking 25-26 februari 1941 (in Dutch). Becht. ISBN 978-90-230-0290-1.
- Stutje, Jan Willem (2000). De man die de weg wees: leven en werk van Paul de Groot 1899-1986. Amsterdam: Bezige Bij. ISBN 978-90-234-3908-0.
