= Wouter Gortzak =

Dutch journalist and politician

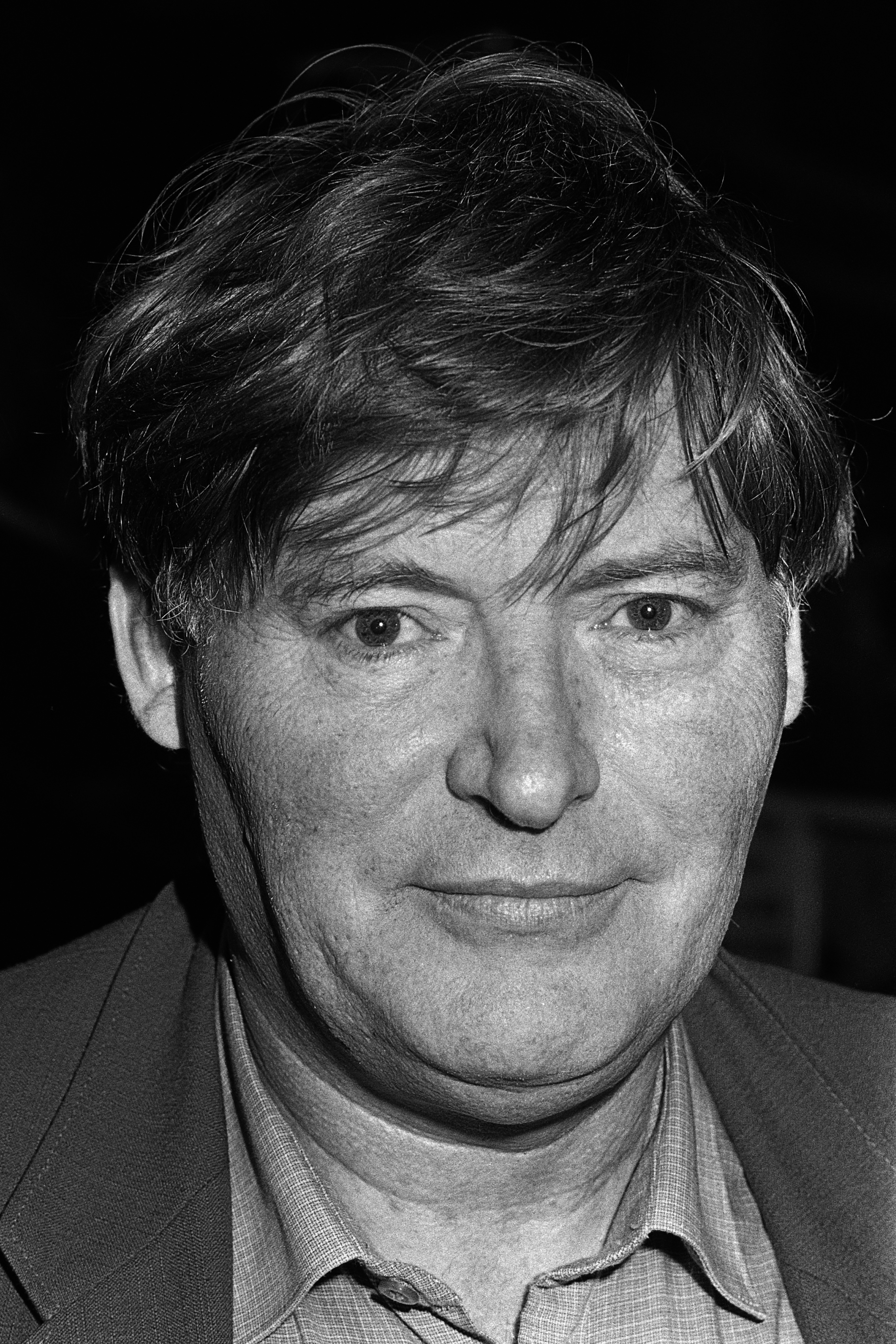
- Gortzak in 1982

Member of the House of Representatives
- In office 19 May 1998 – 23 May 2002

Personal details
- Born: 22 April 1931 Amsterdam, Netherlands
- Died: 26 September 2014 (aged 83) Amsterdam, Netherlands
- Party: Labour Party

Wouter Gortzak (22 April 1931 – 26 September 2014) was a Dutch journalist and politician. He served as editor-in-chief of the newspaper Het Parool for seven years in the 1980s. He was a member of the House of Representatives of the Netherlands between 1998 and 2002 for the Labour Party.

Gortzak was born in Amsterdam to Henk Gortzak, a Communist Party politician. Wouter was a member of the same party between 1954 and 1958, but in 1973 he switched to the Labour Party. Between 1952 and 1954 he was a conscript in the Dutch Army. He was a teacher between 1954 and 1960. Around the same time he studied sociography at the University of Amsterdam, between 1956 and 1964. From 1960 he worked as a book translator for three years. In 1963 he became editor at the De Groene Amsterdammer. He stayed on for twelve years and then became director of the Wiardi Beckman Stichting, the think tank aligned with the Dutch Labour Party. In 1981 he became editor-in-chief of the newspaper Het Parool, he stayed on until 1988. At that point he started as a freelance journalist and publicist. In April 1994 he was elected to deelgemeente/borough council of Amsterdam-Zuid-Oost, his term ended four years later, in 1998. In May of the same year he was elected to the House of Representatives. In the House he also stayed for one term, until 2002. In the House he dealt with minority issues and urban policy. He died on 26 September 2014 in Amsterdam.
