= Rie Lips-Odinot =

Dutch politician (1908-1998)

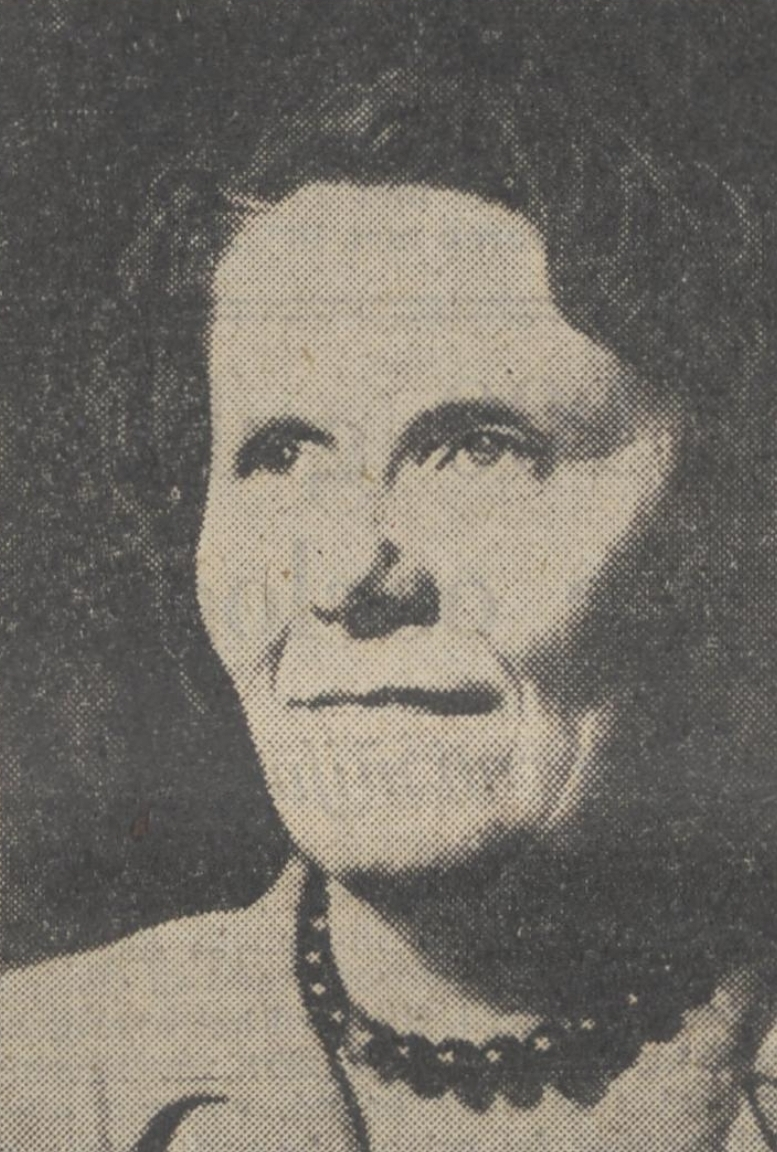
- Rie Lips-Odinot in 1952

Member of the House of Representatives
- In office 16 October 1951 – 3 July 1956
- In office 6 November 1956 – 20 March 1959

Member of the Provincial Council of North Holland
- In office 8 November 1949 – 6 June 1962

Personal details
- Born: Maria Elizabeth Odinot; 4 May 1908 Wijk bij Duurstede, Netherlands
- Died: 26 January 1998 (aged 89) Hilversum, Netherlands
- Party: SDAP (1933-1940); CPN (1945-1958); Brug Group (1958-1959); SWP (1959-1965); PSP (1965-1973)
- Spouse(s): Jan Douwinus Nobbe (m. 1928; died 1942) Jan Servaas Lips (m. 1948)
- Children: 2

Maria Elizabeth "Rie" Lips-Odinot (4 May 1908 – 26 January 1998) was a Dutch politician. She was a member of the Dutch House of Representatives from 1951 to 1959 and of the North Holland provincial council from 1949 to 1962, initially for the Communist Party of the Netherlands (CPN) and after being expelled from the CPN in 1958 for the Socialist Workers' Party. She also served as head of the CPN-aligned Dutch Women's Movement (NVB) from 1953 to 1958.

== Early life ==
Rie Odinot was born on 4 May 1908 in Wijk bij Duurstede to Johannes Marinus Odinot, a carpenter, and Alida Clasina van Bentem. She was the second of four children in a religious orthodox Reformed family, though she abandoned the faith following a conflict with a minister. After completing her education, Odinot worked as a childcare worker for several years, before marrying Jan Douwinus Nobbe in 1928, with whom she would have two children.

In 1933, she joined the Social Democratic Workers' Party (SDAP), influenced by her husband losing his job in the Great Depression Odinot came into conflict with SDAP leadership for her willingness to cooperate with communists, such as in providing aid to the Spanish Republic during the Spanish Civil War. When she became head of the communist inspired World Women's Committee against War and Fascism in 1939, the SDAP refused to collect her party dues, effectively expelling her.

During World War II, Odinot and her husband became involved in the Dutch resistance, spreading illegal pamphlets and assisting Jews. On 25 June 1941, both of them were arrested for "communist activity", despite neither having been communists prior to this period, and imprisoned in Schoorl concentration camp. Odinot was separated from her husband, who died in Dachau concentration camp on 7 September, and was ultimately deported to Ravensbrück concentration camp. She was freed by the Red Army on 1 May 1945, and would later attribute her survival to the intervention of fellow prisoner Orli Wald, who helped Odinot get assigned to a sewing room and later to an outside camp for labour.

== Political career ==
Following her return to the Netherlands, Odinot participated in the founding of the Dutch Women's Movement (Nederlandse Vrouwen Beweging; NVB), a nominally independent women's organisation that in practice was dominated by communists. She became the NVB's vice-chairperson, and due to her humble background and speaking abilities became highly popular with its membership, becoming the NVB's chairperson in 1953. She also joined the Communist Party of the Netherlands (CPN) in 1945, and was elected to the Hilversum municipal council for the CPN in 1946, resigning in 1949 to take a trip to the People's Republic of China for the NVB. On 6 October 1948, Odinot remarried to Jan Servaas Lips, a tailor. In 1949, Lips-Odinot was elected to the North Holland provincial council, where she would serve until 1962. She also served as a member of the CPN executive from 1953 to 1958.

In 1951, Lips-Odinot became a member of the House of Representatives, although she was only admitted on 17 July 1952. As an MP, she primarily focused on health, social work, justice, social affairs and defence personnel. As someone who had only finished secondary education, Lips-Odinot doubted her own ability to serve in parliament. As a communist during the height of the Cold War often faced backlash from some fellow politicians, such as Labour Party (PvdA) minister of Justice Leen Donker, who proclaimed he would refuse to sit at a table with her unless forced to. She was a supporter of efforts to establish legal competence for married women, which she helped accomplish in 1955. Lips-Odinot was also a supporter of the Lamaze technique of childbirth, pioneered in the Soviet Union, and urged the government to provide funding for its further development.

After the beginning of de-Stalinisation in the USSR under Nikita Khrushchev, Lips-Odinot became associated with the opposition within the CPN, known as the Brug Group. In 1958, the members of this group, including Lips-Odinot, were expelled from the CPN by its leader Paul de Groot, though she remained an MP until 1959. She was also expelled from the NVB by Annie van Ommeren-Averink, which due to Lips-Odinot's popularity caused several high-profile members and an entire local NVB branch to exit the group. Lips-Odinot would later compare this period to "falling into a ravine", where her entire world fell apart and even long-term friends and concentration camp survivors refused to speak to her. In 1959, she joined the Socialist Workers' Party (SWP), becoming a part of its leadership and running on the party list for the 1959 Dutch general election, but was not elected.

== Later life ==
After the failure of the SWP, Lips-Odinot became a member of the Pacifist Socialist Party (PSP) in 1965, but left the PSP in 1973. Though she remained politically left-wing her whole life, Lips-Odinot became increasingly critical of communism and her former party, admitting in later years that she and the CPN had mistreated political dissenters due to a belief in the Soviet Union under Joseph Stalin as a utopia. In 1988, she publicly spoke out to sociologist Jolande Withuis about the Red Army's mistreatment of women in Ravensbrück concentration camp following its liberation.

Rie Lips-Odinot died on 26 January 1998 in Hilversum.
