= Marcus Bakker =

Dutch politician (1923–2009)

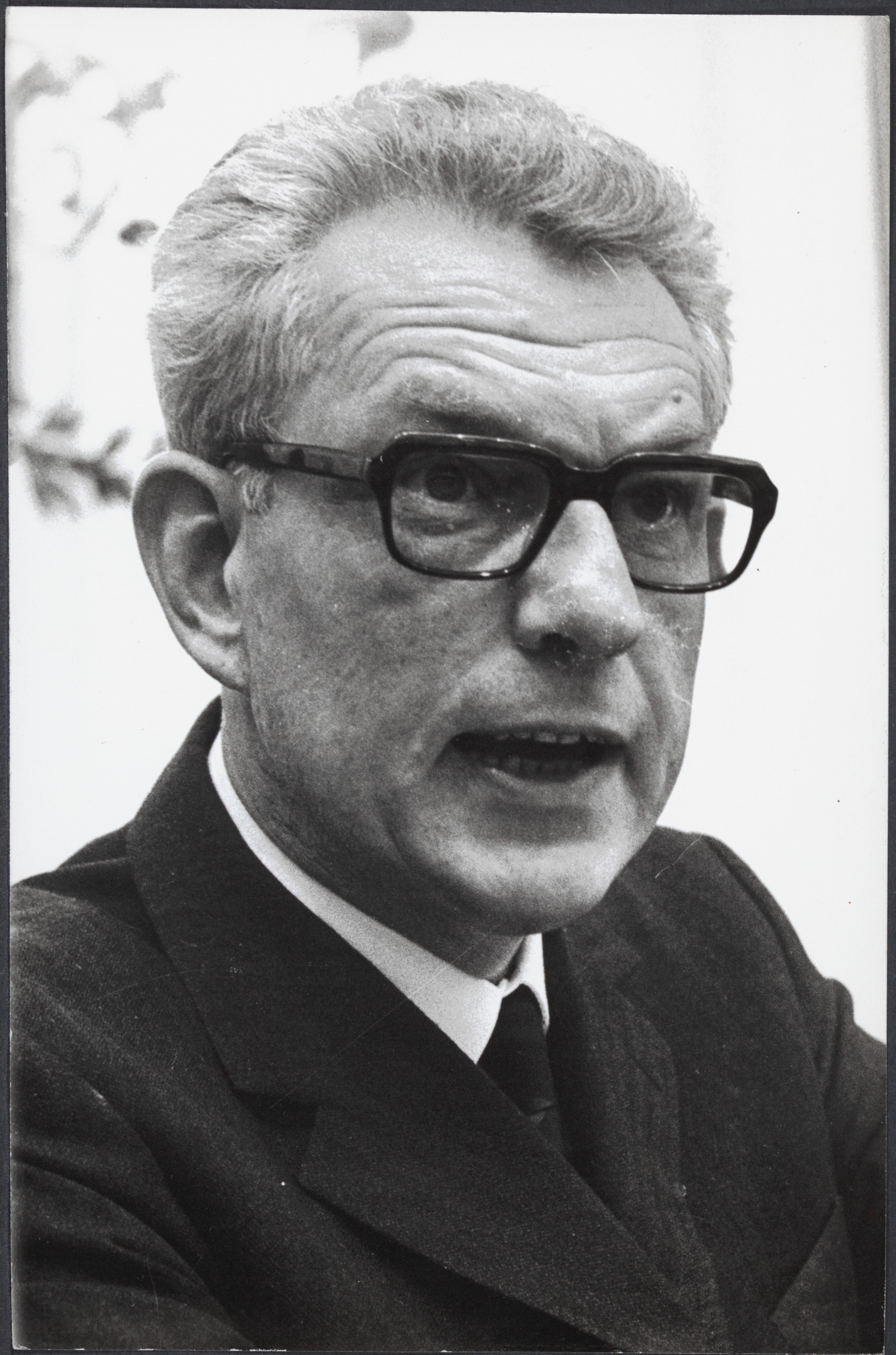
- Marcus Bakker in 1972

Leader of the Communist Party of the Netherlands
- In office 15 December 1963 – 9 September 1982
- Preceded by: Paul de Groot
- Succeeded by: Ina Brouwer

Chairman of the Communist Party of the Netherlands
- In office 15 December 1963 – 9 September 1982
- Preceded by: Paul de Groot
- Succeeded by: Ina Brouwer

Parliamentary leader in the House of Representatives
- In office 15 December 1963 – 9 September 1982
- Preceded by: Paul de Groot
- Succeeded by: Ina Brouwer

Member of the House of Representatives
- In office 7 November 1956 – 16 September 1982

Personal details
- Born: Marcus Bakker; June 20, 1923 Zaandam, Netherlands
- Died: 24 December 2009 (aged 86) Zaandam, Netherlands
- Party: GroenLinks (1989–1999)
- Other political affiliations: Communist Party of the Netherlands (1943–1989)
- Spouse: Els Ezerman (m. 1946)
- Children: 5 children
- Occupation: Politician · Journalist · Editor · Author · Critic · Activist

Marcus Bakker (20 June 1923 – 24 December 2009) was a Dutch politician of the defunct Communist Party of the Netherlands (CPN) now merged into the GroenLinks (GL) party and journalist.

== Biography ==
=== Early life ===
Bakker was the son of an accountant who worked for the slaughterhouse in Zaandam. He joined the then illegal Communist Party of the Netherlands (CPN) in 1943, during World War II. After the war he became an editor of the communist daily newspaper De Waarheid and an official of the CPN.

=== Politics ===
In 1953, Bakker became editor-in-chief of De Waarheid, and in 1956 a member of the House of Representatives. He was a confidant of the then party leader Paul de Groot, who took firm action against dissident movements within the party. Bakker wrote a book called De CPN in de oorlog ("The CPN during the war", 1958), in which he accused prominent party members such as Gerben Wagenaar, Henk Gortzak, Frits Reuter and Bertus Brandsen of being spies. They were eventually expelled from the party.

In 1956, Bakker openly supported the crackdown on demonstrations that expressed solidarity with the protests in Poznań in Communist-led Poland. Bakker did not accept criticism of the Soviet Union.

When the Netherlands were in the process of adopting a new constitution, the draft of Article 1 banned discrimination "on the grounds of religion, conviction, political orientation, race or gender". Bakker proposed to add "or any other ground" to this, which was accepted.

=== Life after politics ===
Bakker was succeeded as CPN leader by Ina Brouwer in 1982. He was not involved in the talks that led the party to merge with three other parties to form GroenLinks in 1991. He became a member of the new party, but cancelled his membership in 1999, when the party supported the NATO bombing of Yugoslavia.

Bakker published his memoirs, entitled Wissels - Bespiegelingen zonder berouw ("Reflections without Contrition"). He criticized his own role in the Cold War, but did not apologize for it. He also expressed regrets about labelling dissident party members spies. Bakker never distanced himself from communism as an ideology, although he stated that he felt 'used' by the communist practice in the Eastern Bloc. Particularly the revelation that the Soviet Union was behind the Katyn massacre was a disillusionment to Bakker.

The Marcus Bakkerzaal, a room in the current building of the Dutch House of Representatives, was named after Bakker in 1991.

=== Personal life ===
Bakker married Els Ezerman in 1946. The couple had five children. He died on December 24, 2009, at the age of 86.

Party political offices
Preceded by Paul de Groot	Lijsttrekker of the Communist Party of the Netherlands; 1967, 1971, 1972, 1977, 1981	Succeeded by Ina Brouwer
Preceded by Paul de Groot	Leader of the Communist; Party of the Netherlands; 1963–1982	Succeeded by Ina Brouwer
Preceded by Paul de Groot	Chairman of the Communist; Party of the Netherlands; 1963–1982	Succeeded by Ina Brouwer
Preceded by Paul de Groot	Parliamentary leader of the Communist Party of the Netherlands in the House of Representatives; 1963–1982	Succeeded by Ina Brouwer
