= Jos van der Lans =

Dutch politician

Josephus Johannes Maria (Jos) van der Lans
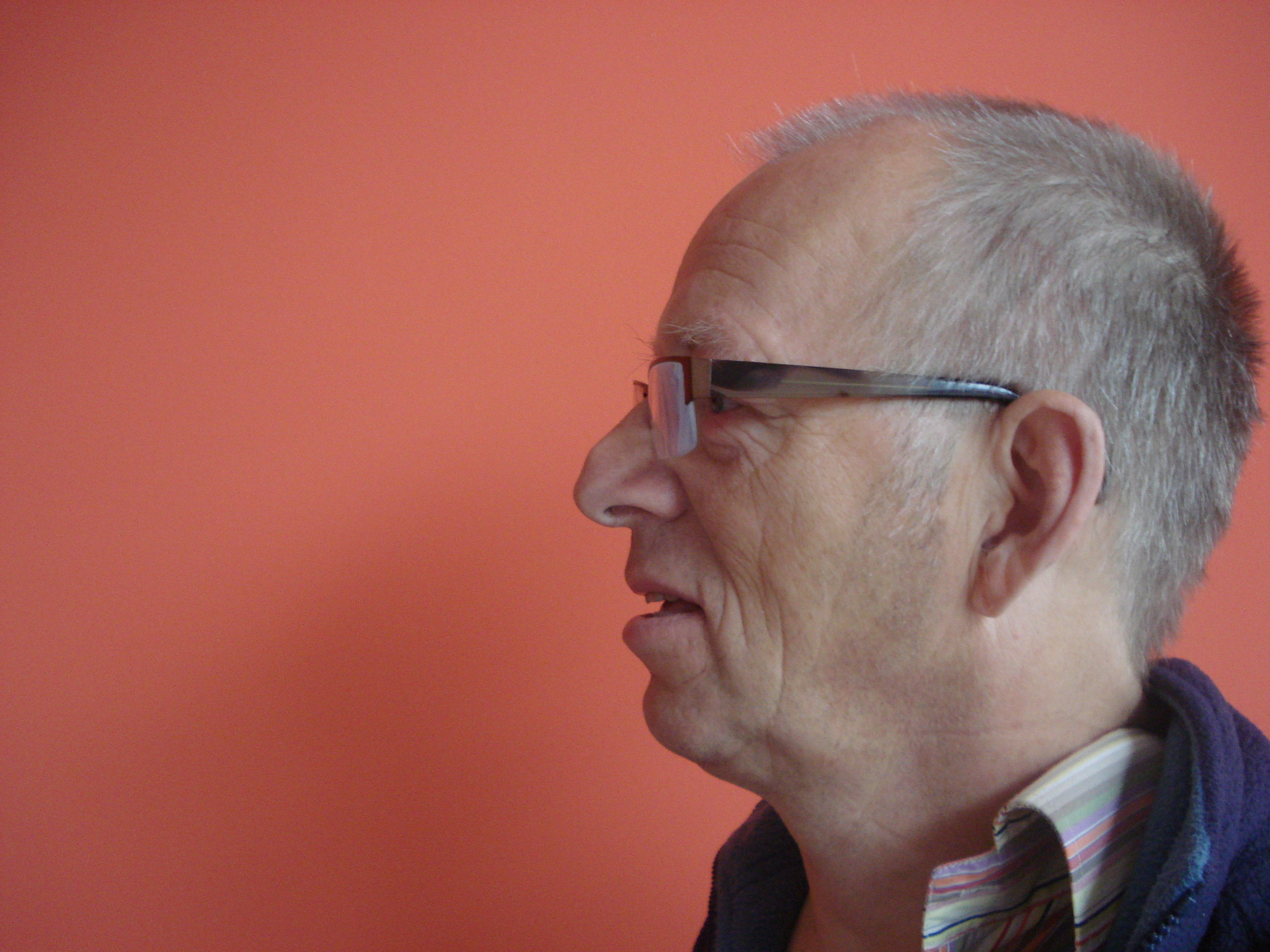

Member of Parliament
- In office 1999–2007

Personal details
- Born: 2 April 1954 (age 72) Breda, Netherlands
- Party: GreenLeft
- Education: Catholic University Nijmegen
- Website: josvdlans.nl

Josephus Johannes Maria (Jos) van der Lans (born 2 April 1954, in Breda) is a cultural psychologist, journalist and writer. Between 1999 and 2007 he was member of the Dutch Senate for GreenLeft

== Background ==
Van der Lans has a Catholic background. Between 1960 and 1967 he attended a Catholic primary school in Amsterdam (until 1964) and The Hague. Between 1967 and 1973 he attended a Catholic secondary school in The Hague. He attended the atheneum and specialized in sciences. Between 1973 and 1981 he studied psychology at the Catholic University Nijmegen. In 1977 he received his candidate's exam (roughly equivalent to a bachelor's degree) and in 1981 he received his doctoral exam (roughly equivalent to a master's degree. Van der Lans specialized in cultural psychology and Psychology of religion. He also took additional courses in communication studies and education studies. He wrote his doctoral thesis about "Youth Culture, Provo and the Youth Movement" . Between 1979 and 1981 he attended courses to become a teacher in civics and science education. Between 1977 and 1981 he worked as a student-assistant on the faculty of social sciences at different departments. Between 1977 and 1983 he worked as a journalist for the quarterly magazine Psychologie & Maatschappij (Psychology and Society).

As a student Van der Lans was active in the student movement and in university politics. Between 1975 and 1977 he was chair of the Nijmegen Student Union and between 1977 and 1978 he was the student member of the board of the subfaculty of psychology. In 1978 Van der Lans joined the Communist Party of the Netherlands, which he left in 1986 because internal struggles had caused the decline of the party.

== Journalist and Writer ==
Since 1981 Van der Lans started to work as journalist. First as a freelancer for the magazine Jeugd en Samenleving (Youth and Society). Between 1982 and 1987 he was editor of the magazine Marge, the monthly journal for social work. Between 1983 and 1984 he was part-time teacher in psychology at the Advanced School in Nijmegen. Between 1987 he was assistant editor in chief and later editor in chief of the Welzijnseweekblad, the weekly magazine for social work and the Tijdschrift voor de Sociale Sector, another journal on social work. Between 1987 and 1995 he wrote for De Helling (The Slope), the quarterly of the think tanks of the political parties CPN, the Pacifist Socialist Party and the Political Party of Radicals. These parties merged in 1989 to form GreenLeft, which Van der Lans joined. De Helling became the quarterly of the think tank of this party. In this period Van der Lans was also active in civil society. He was a member of the Board of the Catholic Youth Organization, Catholic Service Institute for Life Forming. He also was a member of the board of the De Helling.

Between 1990 and 1991 Van der Lans was full-time freelancer with his own advice bureau, which worked in the (semi-)public sector. Between 1991 and 1994 he worked for De Volkskrant, a major centre-left daily as editor of the opinion & discussion page "Forum". He also worked for the Tijdschrift voor de Sociale Sector and other magazines in the semi-public sector. In 1993 he left De Volkskrant and worked De Groene Amsterdammer, a left wing weekly (between 1993 and 1999) and for Vrij Nederland, another leftwing weekly (between 2001 and 2004). At Vrij Nederland he edited the opinion & discussion page "Burning Issues". He also had a column in the Tijdschrift voor sociale vraagstukken (since 1994) and the weekly magazine for parents J/M (between 1997 and 1999). He continued to be active for de Helling as an editor. Between 1995 and 2000 he also was a member of the board of the GreenLeft think tank.

In 2005 Van der Lans wrote Koning Burger (King Citizen) a critical analysis of the relationship between government and citizen. It was followed by Ontregelen (De-regulate) on the position of professionals in the (semi-)public sector. Van der Lans continues to work as a freelancer. He writes several columns: for the magazine of Aedes (the federation of public housing agencies), for DANS (the magazine of the centre for amateur dancing) and the GreenLeft magazine.

Furthermore, he is the member of several boards in the semi-public sector, such as organisation advise bureau De Beuk, HVO Querido, a foundation for social work, the Foundation for the interest of homeless people in Amsterdam ("Stichting Belangenbehartiging Amsterdamse Dak- en Thuislozen"), the Foundation Culture at 't IJ and his own foundation EROPAF! (RIGHT AT IT!), an initiative based around his vision on the role of professionals and citizens in the public sector.

== Member of the Senate ==
Between 1999 and 2007 Van der Lans was a member of the GreenLeft parliamentary party in the Dutch Senate. He spoke on a range of issues: transport, public works and water management; housing, spatial planning and the environment; culture and economic affairs. Between 2003 and 2007 he chaired the parliamentary committee on Transport, Public Works and Water Management. He voted against his own parliamentary party on the parliamentary approval of the marriage between Willem-Alexander en Máxima Zorreguieta out of republican sentiments.

== Political and social ideas ==
Van der Lans mainly writes on the welfare state and specifically the role of social work and public housing agencies. He is primarily interested in the relationship between government, citizens and professionals in the public sector.

Since 1994 Van der Lans has pled, together with Paul Kuypers in their Modern Paternalisme (Modern Paternalisme), against the culture of non-interference in social work. Social workers should intervene actively in the life of their clients without becoming moralist (as in the 1950s) or overly persistent (as in the 1970s). According to Van der Lans this culture of non-intervention is a result of the larger scale of social work and the increased respect for privacy of citizens. Professionals such as teachers, policemen and social workers, should according to Van der Lans be freed from the increased bureaucracy in the public sector. In the eyes of Van der Lans, the increased bureaucracy is a result of the larger demand of the transparency in the civil service from the politics. When professionals free themselves from bureaucracy they can orient themselves to their work on the "front lines of society". They should interfere in the life of their clients with a "right at it"-mentality.

Van der Lans is very critical of the role of citizens in the public sector. In his eyes citizens act as "kings": they expect government to solve their problems immediately. The government reacts as servant: politicians claim to want to listen to citizens. According to Van der Lans these relations have changed radically: before the politicians were the "kings" and the citizens servants. Van der Lans denies that there is a problem of representation in politics: never has politics tried to respond so strongly to the demands of citizens. This has shown the weakness of government however, which cannot deal with all the demands of all the citizens in the short term.

== Private life ==
Van der Lans co-habits. He has four children, two of which are foster children.

== Publications ==
This is a selection of Van der Lans' publications

- "Giftige bonbons" ("Poisonous Chocolates" stories, 1986)
- "Modern Paternalisme" ("Modern Paternalism" manifest, 1994, with Paul Kuypers)
- "De onzichtbare samenleving" ("The Unseen Society" essays, 1995)
- "Lage landen. Hoge sprongen. Nederland in beweging 1898-1998" ("Low Countries. High Jumps. The Netherlands on the move 1898-1998" 1998 with Herman Vuijsje)
- "Typisch Nederlands. Vademecum van de Nederlandse identiteit" ("Typically Dutch. Handbook on the Dutch identity" 1999 with Herman Vuijsje)
- "Het verlangen naar de stad" ("the Desire of the City" 2002 with Herman Vuijsje)
- "Het woninkrijk der Bloemstraters" ("The small kingdom of those who lived in the Bloemstraat" 2003)
- "Bemoeien werkt" ("Intervention works" 2003 with Nies Medema en Marc Räkers)
- "Koning burger - Nederland als zelfbedieningszaak" ("King Citizens - the Netherlands as Supermarket" 2005)
- "Ontregelen - De herovering van de werkvloer" ("De-regulate - The return of the professional" 2008)
