= 1948 Dutch Senate election =

- 8 July 1948
- All 50 seats in the Senate; 26 seats needed for a majority
Party	Leader	Vote %	Seats	+/–
KVP		32.99	17	0
PvdA		25.74	14	0
ARP		12.48	7	0
CHU		9.48	5	0
CPN		11.19	4	0
VVD		6.72	3	0
This lists parties that won seats. See the complete results below.
President of the Senate before	President of the Senate after
Roelof Kranenburg; VDB	Roelof Kranenburg; PvdA

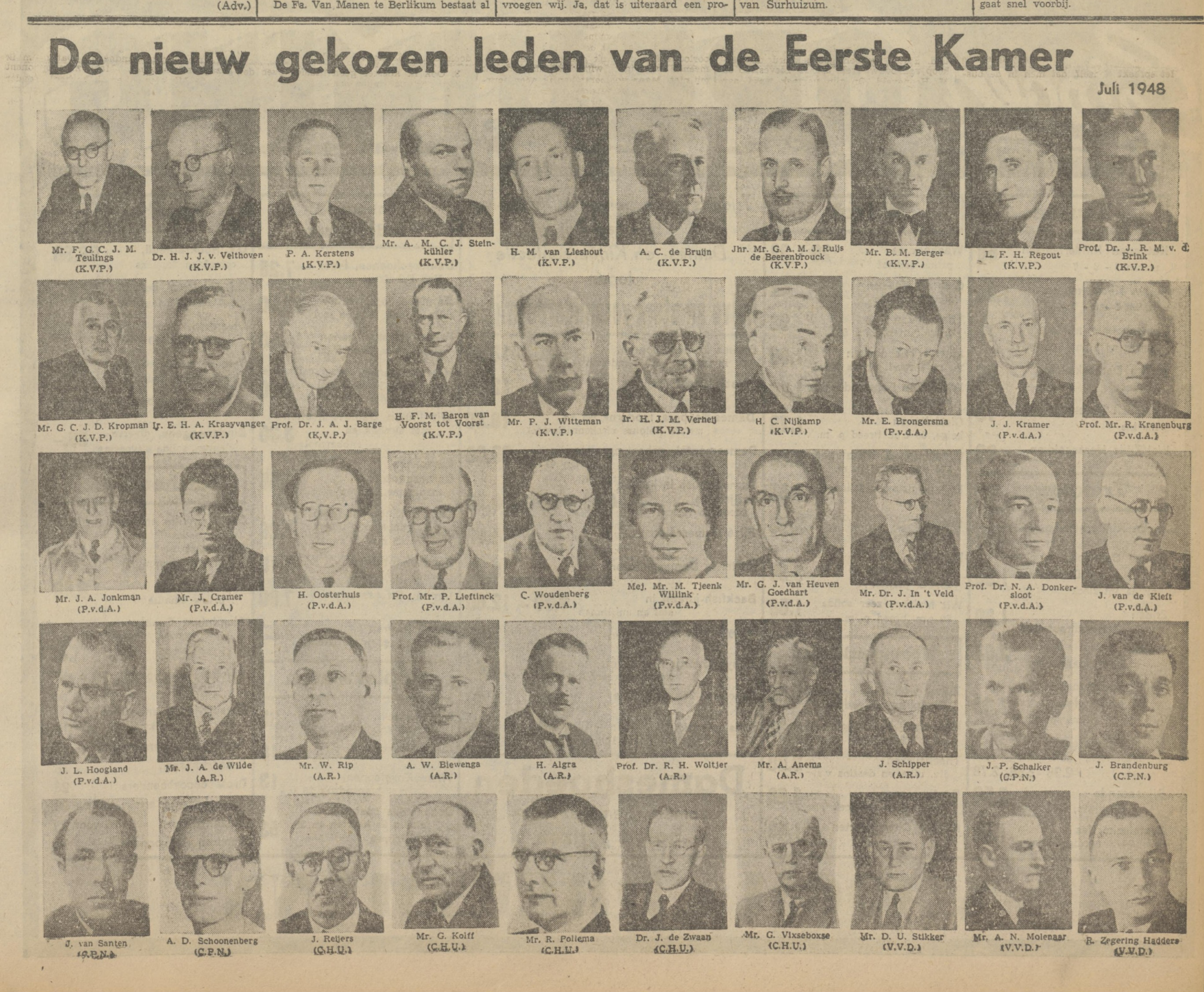
Elected Senators

Elections for all 50 seats in the Senate of the Netherlands were held on 8 July 1948.

Senators were elected by provincial councils in four "electoral groups". Group I comprised North Brabant, Zeeland, Utrecht and Limburg; group II comprised Gelderland, Overijssel, Groningen and Drenthe; group III comprised North Holland and Friesland; and group IV comprised South Holland. Within each electoral group, Senators were elected by provincial councils using party-list proportional representation. Provincial councillors' votes were weighted to their province's population.

As Senators were elected by the same provincial councillors as in the previous 1946 Senate election, no seats changed hands. The incumbent government, consisting of the Catholic People's Party (KVP) and the Labour Party (PvdA) retained its combined majority of 31 seats.

== Results ==
1948 Senate election
Party	Unweighted		Weighted		Seats	+/–
Party	Votes	%	Votes	%	Seats	+/–
Catholic People's Party	182	31.22	30,428	32.99	17	0
Labour Party	155	26.59	23,745	25.74	14	0
Anti-Revolutionary Party	79	13.55	11,511	12.48	7	0
Communist Party of the Netherlands	51	8.75	10,322	11.19	4	0
Christian Historical Union	66	11.32	8,744	9.48	5	0
People's Party for Freedom and Democracy	41	7.03	6,198	6.72	3	0
Reformed Political Party	9	1.54	1,293	1.40	0	0
Total	583	100.00	92,241	100.00	50	0
Valid votes	583	100.00	92,241	100.00		
Invalid/blank votes	0	0.00	0	0.00		
Total votes	583	100.00	92,241	100.00		
Registered voters/turnout	590	98.81	92,370	99.86		
Source: Staatscourant

=== By electoral group ===
1948 Senate election in electoral group I
Party	Unweighted		Weighted		Seats	+/–
Party	Votes	%	Votes	%	Seats	+/–
Catholic People's Party	110	56.12	16,939	64.02	9	0
Labour Party	32	16.33	3,806	14.39	2	0
Christian Historical Union	19	9.69	1,786	6.75	1	0
Anti-Revolutionary Party	15	7.65	1,614	6.10	1	0
People's Party for Freedom and Democracy	10	5.10	1,212	4.58	0	0
Reformed Political Party	5	2.55	368	1.39	0	0
Communist Party of the Netherlands	5	2.55	733	2.77	0	0
Total	196	100.00	26,458	100.00	13	0
Valid votes	196	100.00	26,458	100.00		
Invalid/blank votes	0	0.00	0	0.00		
Total votes	196	100.00	26,458	100.00		
Registered voters/turnout	192	102.08	25,929	102.04		
Source: Staatscourant

1948 Senate election in electoral group II
Party	Unweighted		Weighted		Seats	+/–
Party	Votes	%	Votes	%	Seats	+/–
Labour Party	58	31.35	6,861	30.20	4	0
Catholic People's Party	36	19.46	5,164	22.73	3	0
Anti-Revolutionary Party	30	16.22	3,437	15.13	2	0
Christian Historical Union	27	14.59	3,411	15.02	2	0
People's Party for Freedom and Democracy	17	9.19	1,856	8.17	1	0
Communist Party of the Netherlands	16	8.65	1,853	8.16	1	0
Reformed Political Party	1	0.54	133	0.59	0	0
Total	185	100.00	22,715	100.00	13	0
Valid votes	185	100.00	22,715	100.00		
Invalid/blank votes	0	0.00	0	0.00		
Total votes	185	100.00	22,715	100.00		
Registered voters/turnout	189	97.88	23,303	97.48		
Source: Staatscourant

1948 Senate election in electoral group III
Party	Unweighted		Weighted		Seats	+/–
Party	Votes	%	Votes	%	Seats	+/–
Labour Party	40	32.79	6,478	31.77	4	0
Communist Party of the Netherlands	22	18.03	4,066	19.94	2	0
Catholic People's Party	18	14.75	3,573	17.52	2	0
Anti-Revolutionary Party	22	18.03	3,292	16.15	2	0
Christian Historical Union	13	10.66	1,699	8.33	1	0
People's Party for Freedom and Democracy	7	5.74	1,282	6.29	1	0
Total	122	100.00	20,390	100.00	12	0
Valid votes	122	100.00	20,390	100.00		
Invalid/blank votes	0	0.00	0	0.00		
Total votes	122	100.00	20,390	100.00		
Registered voters/turnout	127	96.06	21,490	94.88		
Source: Staatscourant

1948 Senate election in electoral group IV
Party	Unweighted		Weighted		Seats	+/–
Party	Votes	%	Votes	%	Seats	+/–
Labour Party	25	31.25	6,600	31.25	4	0
Catholic People's Party	18	22.50	4,752	22.50	3	0
Anti-Revolutionary Party	12	15.00	3,168	15.00	2	0
Communist Party of the Netherlands	8	10.00	2,112	10.00	1	0
Christian Historical Union	7	8.75	1,848	8.75	1	0
People's Party for Freedom and Democracy	7	8.75	1,848	8.75	1	0
Reformed Political Party	3	3.75	792	3.75	0	0
Total	80	100.00	21,120	100.00	12	0
Valid votes	80	100.00	21,120	100.00		
Invalid/blank votes	0	0.00	0	0.00		
Total votes	80	100.00	21,120	100.00		
Registered voters/turnout	82	97.56	21,648	97.56		
Source: Staatscourant
