= Henk Gortzak =

Dutch politician (1908–1989)

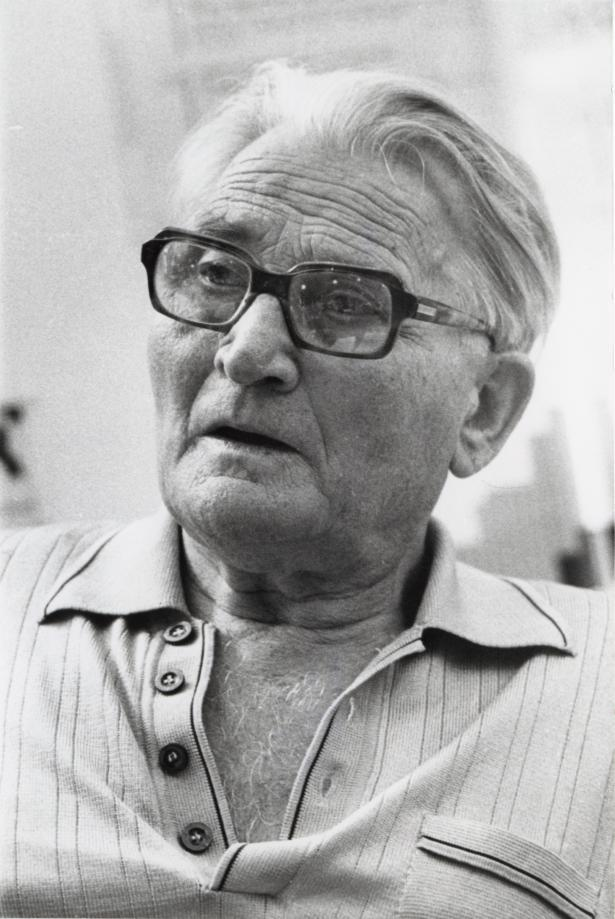
- Henk Gortzak in 1982

Member of the House of Representatives
- In office 27 July 1948 – 20 March 1959
- In office 3 June 1969 – 10 May 1971

Personal details
- Born: Hendricus Gortzak; 25 April 1908 Amsterdam
- Died: 31 March 1989 (aged 80) Amsterdam
- Party: CPN (1924-1933, 1934-1958); Brug-groep (1958); SWP (1959-1965); PSP (1965-1974)
- Spouse: Janna de Vries (m. 1929)
- Children: 3, including Wouter

Hendricus (Henk) Gortzak (25 April 1908 - 31 March 1989) was a Dutch politician who served as a member of the House of Representatives, first from 1948 to 1959 for the Communist Party of the Netherlands (CPN), during which he was the CPN's parliamentary leader from 1952 to 1958, and second from 1969 to 1971 for the Pacifist Socialist Party (PSP), after his expulsion from the CPN in 1958.

== Early life ==
Henk Gortzak was born on 25 April 1908 in Amsterdam. He trained to become a carpenter in his youth, and quickly became interested in left-wing politics, becoming a member of the Communist Youth League in 1923, the youth movement of the Communist Party of Holland (CPH), which was renamed to the Communist Party of the Netherlands in 1935. In 1931, he was sent to Moscow to study at the International Lenin School. His political career was almost derailed when he was expelled from the CPH in 1933 after a misunderstanding on his role in a strike. He participated in the Jordaanoproer in 1934, handing out pamphlets during the unrest, during which he rejoined the party.

During the German invasion of the Netherlands, Gortzak served in the Dutch army and was captured as a prisoner of war by the Germans. Following his release in June 1940, he began to work for the underground Communist resistance, and was involved in the February Strike in 1941. He went into hiding in Rotterdam and Utrecht, where he led a resistance group engaged in printing illegal pamphlets and raising money for people in hiding. Gortzak was arrested in 1944 and imprisoned in Vught and Sachsenhausen concentration camps.

== Political career ==
Immediately following the end of World War II and his liberation by Soviet troops, Gortzak assisted in the rebuilding of the Communist Party of Germany in Potsdam. When he returned to the Netherlands, Gortzak began his career by getting elected to the Amsterdam municipal council, a function which he held until 1958. In the 1948 Dutch general election, he was first elected to serve in the House of Representatives, being elevated to the position of parliamentary leader in 1952. As an MP, he focused on education and housing issues, and became known as a fierce debater who was seen as a demagogue by many, if perhaps to a lesser extent than party leader Paul de Groot.

The policy of de-Stalinisation undertaken by Nikita Khrushchev in the USSR also impacted many within the CPN and led to increased criticism of De Groot's authoritarian leadership within the party. De Groot's attempts to curtail the independence of the CPN-linked Unity Trade Union (Eenheidsvakcentrale) and his decision to send the severely ill Jaap Brandenburg to be treated by doctors in the GDR without the knowledge of his friends like Gortzak further inflamed internal tensions. In April 1958, the conflict culminated in Henk Gortzak, along with Gerben Wagenaar, Bertus Brandsen and several others being officially expelled from the CPN, although he would remain an MP until 1959 and a member of the provincial council of North Holland, to which he had been first elected in 1950, until 1962.

The expellees founded the Brug-groep that same year and sought to run in the 1959 Dutch general election, but did not win a single seat amidst a slander campaign mounted by the CPN against them, labeling them as traitors who had been British agents during the Second World War. In 1959, Gortzak participated in the founding of the Socialist Workers Party (SWP), but the SWP had little political success and Gortzak joined the Pacifist Socialist Party (PSP) in 1965, renouncing his past opposition to pacifism. He again became a member of the House of Representatives, this time for the PSP, in 1969, and faced severe opposition from CPN MPs, who refused to vote for any motion proposed by him. Whereas moderates within the PSP had initially distrusted Gortzak, he proved to be a conciliatory figure within the party. He left the House of Representatives in 1971.

== Later life ==
In 1974, Gortzak left the PSP due to concerns about growing radicalism within the party. Along with the other members of the CPN expelled in 1958, he was officially rehabilitated by the party in 1982, but chose not to rejoin. His son Wouter Gortzak would serve in the House of Representatives for the Labour Party (PvdA) from 1998 to 2002.

Gortzak died on 31 March 1989 in Amsterdam.

== Bibliography ==
- Stutje, Jan Willem (2000). De man die de weg wees: leven en werk van Paul de Groot 1899-1986. Amsterdam: Bezige Bij. ISBN 978-90-234-3908-0.
