= Frits Dragstra =

Dutch politician

Member of the House of Representatives
- In office 7 December 1972 – 8 June 1977

Member of the States of Limburg
- In office 2 June 1966 – 7 June 1978

Personal details
- Born: 6 October 1927 Treebeek, Netherlands
- Died: 5 June 2015 (aged 87) Brunssum, Netherlands
- Party: Communist Party of the Netherlands (CPN)

Frits Dragstra (6 October 1927 – 5 June 2015) was a Dutch politician, he served as member of the House of Representatives for the Communist Party of the Netherlands between 1972 and 1977 and in the States of Limburg between 1966 and 1978.

== Career ==
Dragstra was born on 6 October 1927 in Treebeek, the son of a mineworker. He started his political career on 2 September 1958 when he became member of the municipal council of Heerlen for the Communist Party of the Netherlands. A 1960 report by Dutch intelligence services named him one of the Communist Party of the Netherlands members in Limburg. Dragstra would stay member of the council for almost 32 years, the last four years as member of the party Klein Links. On his departure from municipal politics he received the silver badge of honor of Heerlen.

Between 2 June 1966 and 7 June 1978 Dragstra was member of the States of Limburg. In the 1972 parliamentary elections he gained a seat in the House of Representatives. He lost his seat after being placed sixth on the party list in the 1977 parliamentary elections.

Dragstra was against the closure of the coal mines in Limburg. After the closure of the mines he supported fired mine workers.

He died on 5 June 2015 in Brunssum.
