= Joop Wolff =

Dutch politician (1927–2007)

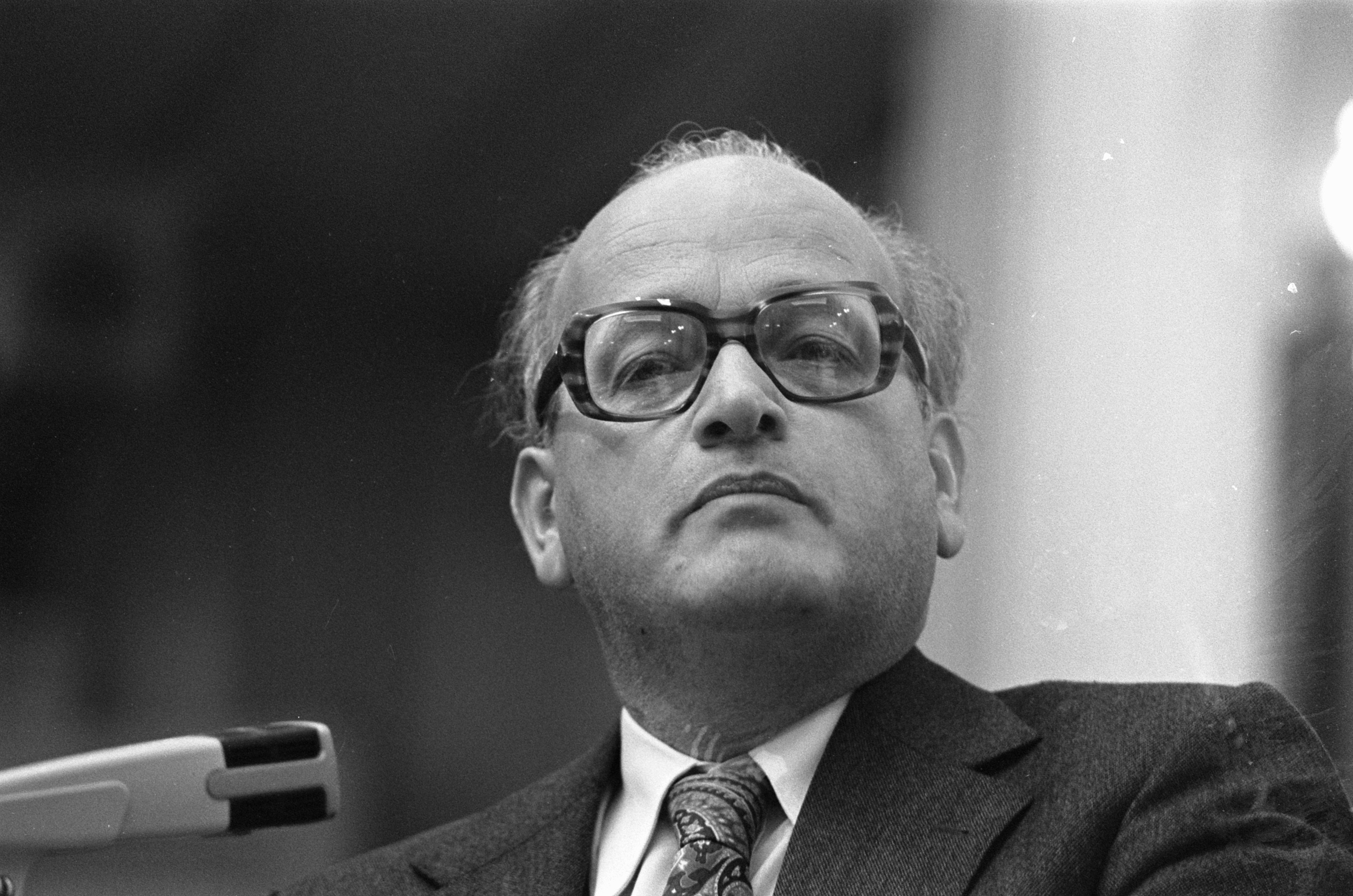
- Wolff in 1974

Member of the House of Representatives
- In office 22 December 1977 – 1 February 1982
- In office 23 February 1967 – 8 June 1977

Personal details
- Born: Johan Frederik Wolff; 14 March 1927 Velsen, Netherlands
- Died: 7 January 2007 (aged 79) Amsterdam, Netherlands
- Party: GroenLinks (1989–2007)
- Other political affiliations: CPN (1943–1991)

Johan Frederik Wolff (14 March 1927 – 7 January 2007) was a Dutch politician. From 1967 to June 1977 and again from December 1977 to 1982, he served as a member of the House of Representatives for the Communist Party of the Netherlands.
