= Socialist Workers' Party (Netherlands, 1959) =

The Socialist Workers' Party (Dutch: Socialistische Werkers Partij, abbreviated SWP) was a communist party in the Netherlands. SWP was founded in 1959, after a split within the leadership of the Communist Party of the Netherlands. The founders of CPN opposed the CPN party secretary Paul de Groot. They had formed the Brug-group, and launched the new party in July 1959. The party held its first congress in Amsterdam, January 23–24, 1960.

Ideologically SWP adhered to Marxism-Leninism, and the party was organized along the lines of democratic centralism. The party had a membership of around 500.

The party proclaimed its solidarity with the Soviet Union, but the Soviets paid little interest in the Dutch splinter group.

In 1965 the majority of SWP members joined the Pacifist Socialist Party.
