= Jordaanoproer =

1934 riot in Amsterdam

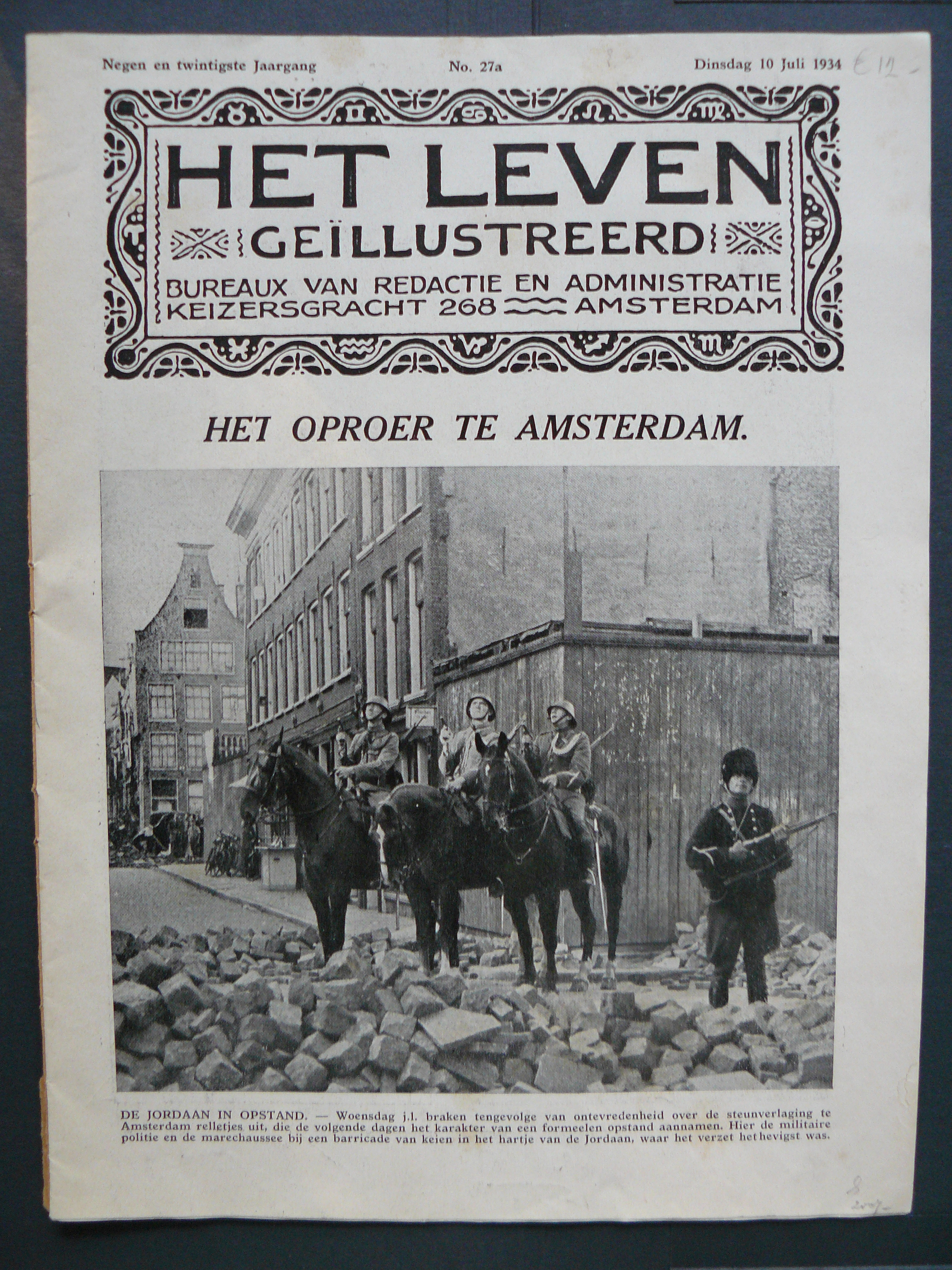
Extra edition of Het Leven on 10 July 1934

The Jordaan riot (Dutch: Jordaanoproer) was a riot of mainly unemployed people in the Jordaan neighbourhood of Amsterdam in July 1934. The riots were a protest against the economic conditions in the Netherlands in the aftermath of the Great Depression. According to the November 1934 report of Chief Commissioner Versteeg, five people were killed and 56 seriously injured, including eight police officers and one member of the military police. During disturbances in the same period in Rotterdam, one person was killed on 10 July.

== See also ==
- 1933 De Zeven Provinciën mutiny
