= Gerben Wagenaar =

Dutch politician

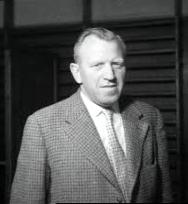
- Gerben Wagenaar in 1956

Member of the House of Representatives
- In office 1945–1959

Personal details
- Born: 27 September 1912 Amsterdam
- Died: 31 August 1993 (aged 80) Amsterdam
- Party: CPN (1935-1958); Brug-groep (1959); SWP (1959-1965)
- Spouse: Gerritje Cornelia Hiensch (1914-1995)
- Children: 1

Gerben Wagenaar (Amsterdam, 27 September 1912 – Amsterdam, 31 August 1993) was a Dutch politician and resistance fighter. He was a member of the Communist Party of the Netherlands (CPN) until his expulsion in 1958, serving as a member of the House of Representatives from 1945 to 1959 and as CPN parliamentary leader between 1946 and 1952.

== Biography ==
=== Early life ===
Gerben Wagenaar was born on 27 September 1912 into a social democratic family in the Jordaan neighborhood of Amsterdam. His father Dirk, a lineman for the tram company, was a life-long member of the Social Democratic Workers Party (SDAP). After leaving school, Gerben became an electrician, working for the municipal electricity company. In 1935, Wagenaar joined the CPN, despite not being allowed to join the party because of his government employment. Due to this, he was temporarily suspended from the Dutch Confederation of Trade Unions (NVV) in 1939.

=== World War II ===
After the Nazis conquered the Netherlands in 1940, he quickly became involved in the Dutch resistance, and played a role in organising the February strike in 1941. When the CPN started organising military resistance groups following the German invasion of the Soviet Union, Wagenaar was made a member of the Military Commission which was to lead these efforts. Operating under the alias "Freek" or "Klaas", he would lead the CPN's resistance activities outside Amsterdam and coordinate attacks on the occupying Germans. In 1943, he narrowly escaped a trap set up by the Sicherheitsdienst to capture him. He gradually rose through the ranks of the Dutch resistance, becoming a member of the national Resistance Council (Raad van Verzet) as the CPN representative in 1943, becoming its chairman in November 1944. He also joined the CPN leadership that same year. For his conduct during the war, Wagenaar became one of the few Dutchmen to be awarded the Legion of Merit by general Dwight D. Eisenhower, which he returned in 1951 to protest the American role in the Korean War.

=== After the war ===
During the formation of the Schermerhorn–Drees cabinet, Wagenaar was offered the position of minister without portfolio, mainly because of the CPN's role in the Dutch Resistance. The CPN refused, demanding instead the position of Minister of Food Supply, Agriculture and Fisheries for its leader Paul de Groot. He was also offered a position on the staff for prince Bernhard, but was made to refuse the offer by party leadership against his personal wishes. On 20 November 1945, Gerben Wagenaar became a member of the House of Representatives for the CPN. He also became the CPN's chairman that same year. While true power in the party remained with general secretary Paul de Groot, Wagenaar, seen as an unintellectual resistance fighter from the working class by De Groot, became his right-hand man.

From 1946 to 1952, Wagenaar was the parliamentary leader of the CPN in the House of Representatives. He became known for his strong ideological stance and fierce performances in parliament, once having to be removed by police from the House of Representatives during a debate on a defence cooperation treaty with the United States in 1950.

=== Conflict and expulsion ===
In 1952, Wagenaar had been given control over the internal party organisation, but an internal party report commissioned by De Groot for the party's 17th congress in 1955 severely criticised his performance, after which his relationship with De Groot began to sour. Criticism of De Groot was also mounting as a result of Nikita Khrushchev's de-Stalinisation policy, and his desire to weaken the CPN-linked Unity Trade Union (Eenheidsvakcentrale) in order to gain more influence within the mainstream NVV union. Wagenaar shifted loyalties between De Groot and the opposition several times, but in March 1958 he sided with the opposition over De Groot's plans to expel two EVC leaders from the party, despite having been chosen to lead the CPN electoral list in North Holland for the 1958 provincial elections.

On 4 April 1958, Wagenaar, along with several other CPN opposition members, was officially expelled from the party. Despite this, he continued to serve in the House of Representatives until 1959 and in the North Holland provincial assembly until 1962. The CPN launched a campaign to discredit the expelled, which included a 1958 book written by Marcus Bakker titled "The CPN during the War", in which Wagenaar was labeled as a traitor and a spy for British intelligence.

In 1958, Wagenaar, along with several other CPN expellees including Henk Gortzak, Bertus Brandsen and others, formed the Bridge Group (Brug-groep), with which they intended to participate in the 1959 Dutch general election. The party only got 0.58% of the vote however, and did not earn a seat in parliament. In 1959, he helped found the Socialist Workers Party, but this had little success either and the party disbanded in 1965.

=== Later life ===
After the disbandment of the SWP, Wagenaar retired from politics. He, along with those expelled in 1958, was officially rehabilitated by the CPN in 1982, though he showed no interest in returning to the party. Wagenaar died in Amsterdam on 31 August 1993.
