= Louis de Visser =

Dutch communist politician and activist

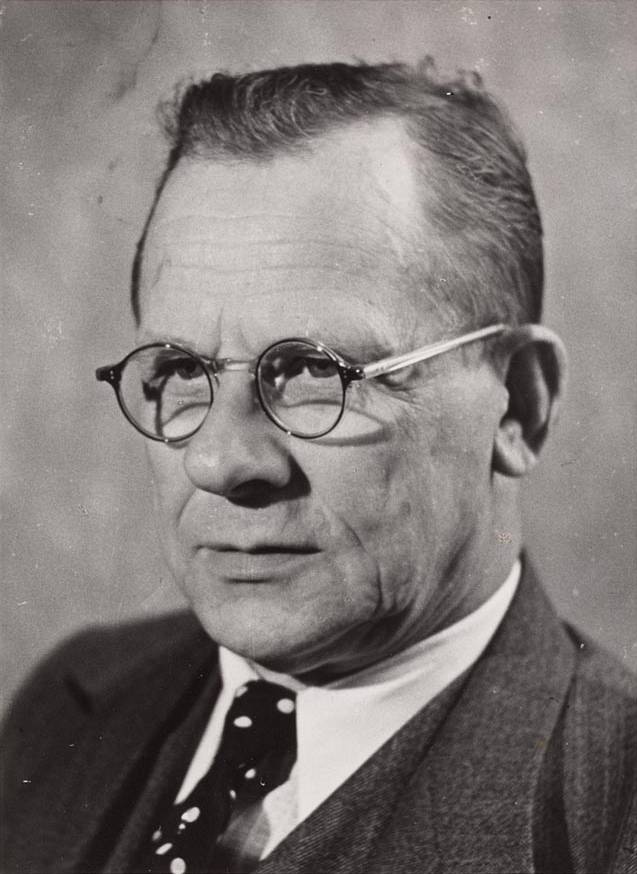

Party chair of the Communist Party of the Netherlands
- In office 1925–1935

Member of the House of Representatives
- In office 1925–1941

Personal details
- Born: 21 May 1878 Delfshaven, Rotterdam, Netherlands
- Died: 3 May 1945 (aged 66) Bay of Lübeck, Baltic Sea
- Party: SDAP; SDP; RSV; CPN

Louis Leonardus Hendrikus "Lou" de Visser (21 May 1878 – 3 May 1945) was a Dutch communist politician and activist.

== Biography ==
Born in to a devout Protestant family of humble origins, de Visser became a worker at a young age and entered politics in the same time.

De Visser was one of the founders of the De Tribune newspaper, which was the official organ of the new Social Democratic Party (SDP), the orthodox Marxist wing of the Social Democratic Workers' Party of Netherlands. In 1909 he resigned from SDAP and became a member of the Revolutionary Socialist Association (RSV) of Henriette Roland Holst which participated in the Zimmerwald Left. In 1916, the RSV and SDP merged and Visser became a propagandist for the new party. This party soon was renamed the Communist Party of the Netherlands. During the 1918 elections he was arrested due to leading a noisy demonstration but was soon released.

De Visser participated in the 3rd World Congress of Communist International. After a crisis in the party leadership regarding policy on trade unions, in which various board members resigned, he became chairman of the CPN in 1925 and a member of the House of Representatives. He was also a member of the Hague city council and of the States of South Holland.

De Visser was involved in a few physical altercations in the House of Representatives, most notably on Prinsjesdag 1934, he and two party members were violently expelled from the joint meeting of the Senate and the House of Representatives by the police, because they had shouted "Indies los van Holland" when the queen entered. Despite evidence such as bloodied clothing, it was denied that the police had used excessive force.

In 1935 he was replaced by the younger Ko Beuzemaker as party chairman but was still elected a member of the Executive Committee of the Comintern. Despite being popular and well-respected in the CPN, he was removed from party leadership in 1939. He published his memoirs in the same year.

In June 1941 he was arrested by the German occupying forces. He canceled his membership of the House of Representatives. He ended up in Neuengamme concentration camp. De Visser was killed in the Allied bombardment of the SS Cap Arcona outside Lübeck, less than a week before Germany's surrender.
