= Paul de Groot =

Dutch politician (1899–1986)

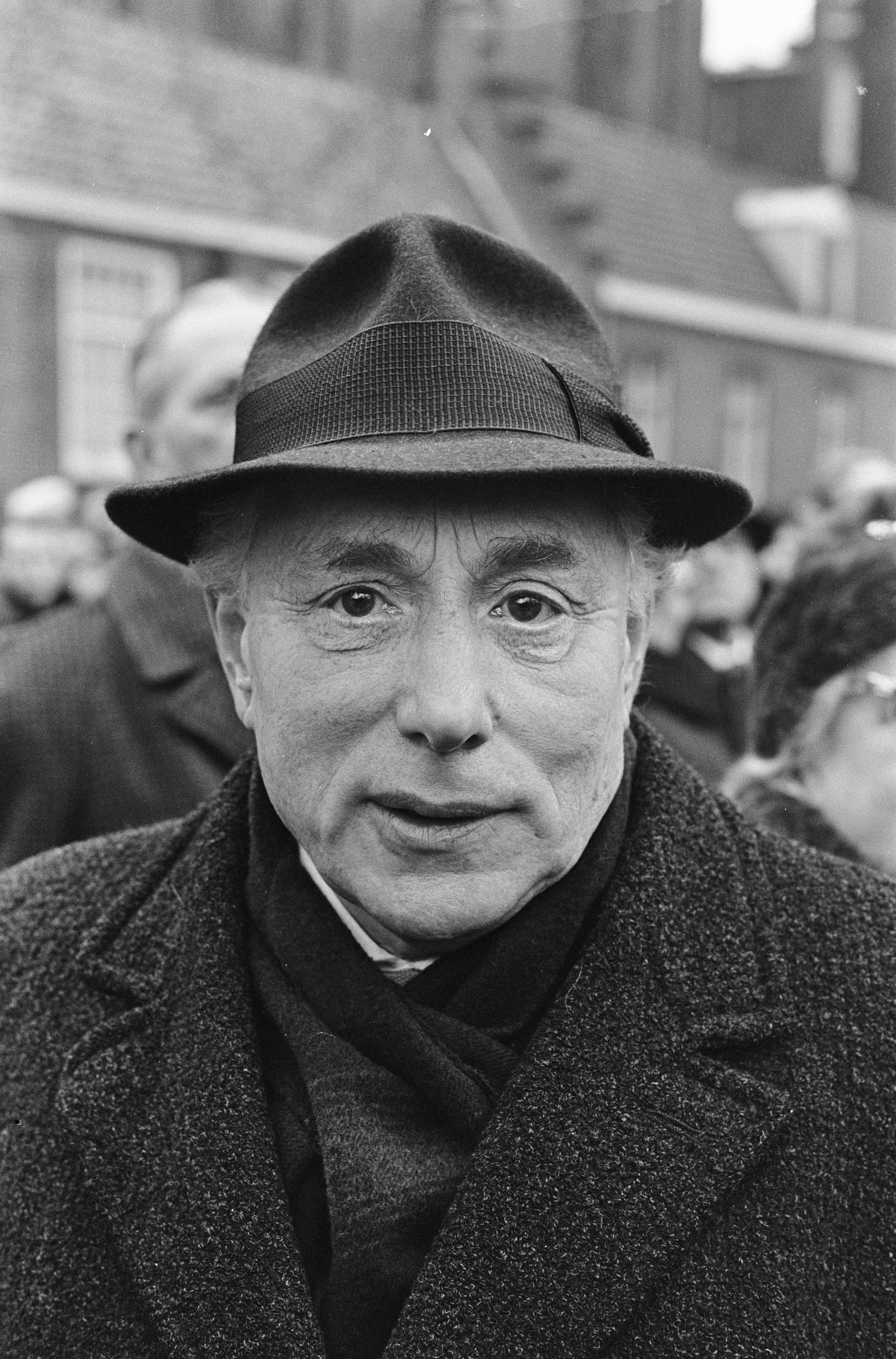
- Paul de Groot in 1967

Chairman of the Communist Party of the Netherlands
- In office 1 September 1962 – 13 January 1968
- Preceded by: Unknown
- Succeeded by: Henk Hoekstra

Parliamentary leader of the Communist Party of the Netherlands in the House of Representatives
- In office 15 April 1958 – 15 December 1963
- Preceded by: Henk Gortzak
- Succeeded by: Marcus Bakker

Member of the House of Representatives
- In office 20 November 1945 – 1 February 1966

Leader of the Communist Party of the Netherlands
- In office 6 May 1945 – 15 December 1963
- Preceded by: Ko Beuzemaker
- Succeeded by: Marcus Bakker

Personal details
- Born: Saul de Groot; 19 July 1899 Amsterdam, Netherlands
- Died: 3 August 1986 (aged 87) Bussum, Netherlands
- Party: Communist Party of the Netherlands (from 1926)
- Other political affiliations: Communist Party of Belgium (from 1921)
- Spouses: Szajndla Borzykowska (m. 1920; died 1942) Eke de Jong (m. 1951)
- Children: 1
- Occupation: Politician, diamond cutter, journalist

Saul "Paul" de Groot (19 July 1899 – 3 August 1986) was a Dutch politician of the Communist Party of the Netherlands (CPN). He was also a member of the House of Representatives for the CPN and chief editor of the party newspaper De Waarheid.

== Early life ==
De Groot was the son of Jacob de Groot, a Jewish diamond cutter in the Jodenbuurt in Amsterdam. His father had previously participated in a successful general strike in 1894 and became a member of the General Diamond Workers' Union of the Netherlands (ANDB). Shortly after his birth in 1899, the family left for Antwerp in search of work.

After primary school, De Groot was unable to continue studying and at the age of 13 he got work in a diamond factory, joining the General Diamond Workers' Union of Belgium (ADB). When Antwerp was threatened by German troops after the outbreak of the First World War, the De Groot family fled to the neutral Netherlands and temporarily settled in Amsterdam in the Transvaalbuurt, Amsterdam's new Jewish quarter.

Unable to find a job in the diamond cutting business due to mass unemployment in the sector and the ANDB's refusal to let returning emigres into the organisation, Paul de Groot got a job with a cigar maker who taught him the principles of socialism. In December 1915 he returned to Antwerp with his parents. De Groot jr. became a diamond worker for a short period, but work soon dried up and the family became dependent on food packages from the Dutch consulate. Unemployed, De Groot followed lessons at the Socialist People's College, learning English and French, and joined the Socialist Young Watch.

== Training ==
Impressed by the October Revolution (1917), he participated in the factional struggle within Belgian social democracy and its communist splinter groups under the pseudonym Paul van der Schilde. He opposed both left-communism as well as radical Flemish nationalism, while being sympathetic to resistance against the oppression of Flanders. On 3-4 September 1921 he attended the founding conference where under severe pressure from the Comintern the United Communist Party of Belgium was formed. De Groot became a member of the party board and wrote for the party newspaper De Roode Vaan.

In 1920, De Groot married Szajndla (Sally) Borzykowska, the daughter of a Jewish juweler from Lodz, who had moved from Russian-occupied Poland in 1912 to escape ongoing pogroms. They would have one child together, Rosa, named after Rosa Luxemburg.

Because of his participation in the agitation against the (temporary) occupation of the Ruhr, in which Belgian troops also participated, and a strike of 50,000 miners in the Borinage region, he was arrested along with 53 other communist leaders on 8 March 1923. He was let out of jail after a day, but at the beginning of April De Groot was ordered to leave the country, because as a foreigner he was not supposed to interfere with internal Belgian affairs.

De Groot then found work in Hanau in Germany, the centre of the German diamond industry, with the recommendation of the Universal Alliance of Diamond Workers. Due to constant unrest in the Weimar Republic due to hyperinflation and a nationwide strike wave, a state of emergency was declared in September 1923. After the suppression of the Hamburg Uprising and the subsequent arrest of thousands of communists, De Groot had to flee Germany in October 1923.

He settled with his family in Saint-Claude, Jura in France, a town with a flourishing diamond industry. There he found work as a diamond cutter for the Sigaar firm, an Amsterdam diamond dealer who was located there so he could pay lower salaries. De Groot tried to complain about this without success to the UADW, where he belonged to the restless communist opposition. De Groot relocated to Amsterdam in the autumn of 1925, finding work at the Boas diamond cutting factory.

== In the Netherlands ==
Back in the Netherlands, he became active again in the General Diamond Workers' Union of the Netherlands (ANDB) and in the Communist Party Holland (CPH), the predecessor of the Communist Party of the Netherlands (CPN).

After a purge of political leadership enforced by Moscow under the leadership of Kees Schalker, De Groot joined the party board of the CPN in February 1930. Because of his activist past, extensive erudition (besides Karl Marx he also read Heinrich Heine), intelligence, journalistic qualities and tactical insight, he stood head and shoulders above his fellow directors. This and his almost slavish loyalty to Stalin led to De Groot becoming political secretary of the party in 1938, which had since been renamed to the Communist Party of the Netherlands. He formed the party presidency with Lou Jansen and Jan Dieters. He also became editor-in-chief of the newspaper Het Volksdagblad. He turned out to be a headstrong, often capricious and suspicious leader. By the late 30s he was seen as the de-facto leader of the CPN, but this was not publicly announced and the position of chairman was retained by Ko Beuzemaker.

== World War II ==
Shortly before the German invasion of the Netherlands, De Groot had requested by telegram to be brought over to the Soviet Union. Initially Moscow had agreed, but on 21 May 1940 Georgi Dimitrov, the leader of the Comintern, ordered the CPN leadership to remain in the Netherlands to organise a resistance. On 15 May the CPN had already decided to set up an illegal organisation. De Groot reduced the party leadership down to himself, Jansen and Dieters.

After the German invasion in May 1940, De Groot initially believed that the Hitler–Stalin Pact required a cautious attitude towards the German occupying forces and left room for partial legal activity. As such, he organised negotiations with the occupying forces. A single edition of the Volksdagblad and the party's monthly theoretical journal Politiek en Cultuur were allowed to appear, for which De Groot wrote the lead article in both cases. In the Volksdagblad he wrote that English imperialism and the Dutch bourgeoisie, with the SDAP leader Koos Vorrink as figurehead. had provoked the occupation. In Politiek en Cultuur he advocated for a "correct stance" with regard to the occupation.

It did not prevent the CPN and its organs from being banned by the Germans. In November 1940, the first issue of a new, illegal party newspaper, De Waarheid, was published. De Groot aimed his arrows at the German aggressor, but also continued to fight "Anglo-American imperialism", the government in London and the Social Democratic Workers' Party (SDAP). Only with the German attack on the Soviet Union in June 1941 did he change course. Incidentally, it was not De Groot, as the party legend later proposed, but fellow board member Jansen who wrote the famous manifesto Staakt, staakt, staakt on the eve of the February strike of 1941. The CPN has always considered this strike to be the culmination of the communist resistance against the Nazis in the Netherlands.

In October 1942, the Germans raided the house where De Groot and his family were hiding. De Groot managed to escape through the back door, but his wife and daughter were taken to Auschwitz and gassed there, which made him feel guilty and troubled for the rest of his life. In February 1943 he again narrowly escaped arrest by the Germans. He then turned the party leadership over to others (including Jaap Brandenburg) and cut off all contact with the illegal party.

== Recovery after 1945 ==
After the war, De Groot succeeded in quickly and easily regaining power within the CPN. For a short time he promoted the dissolution of the party in favour of an "Association of Friends of De Waarheid", because in that first post-war period the communist newspaper De Waarheid enjoyed wide popularity because of its resistance origins. Fierce criticism from his own ranks and an ok from Moscow made De Groot decide in July 1945 to re-establish the CPN.

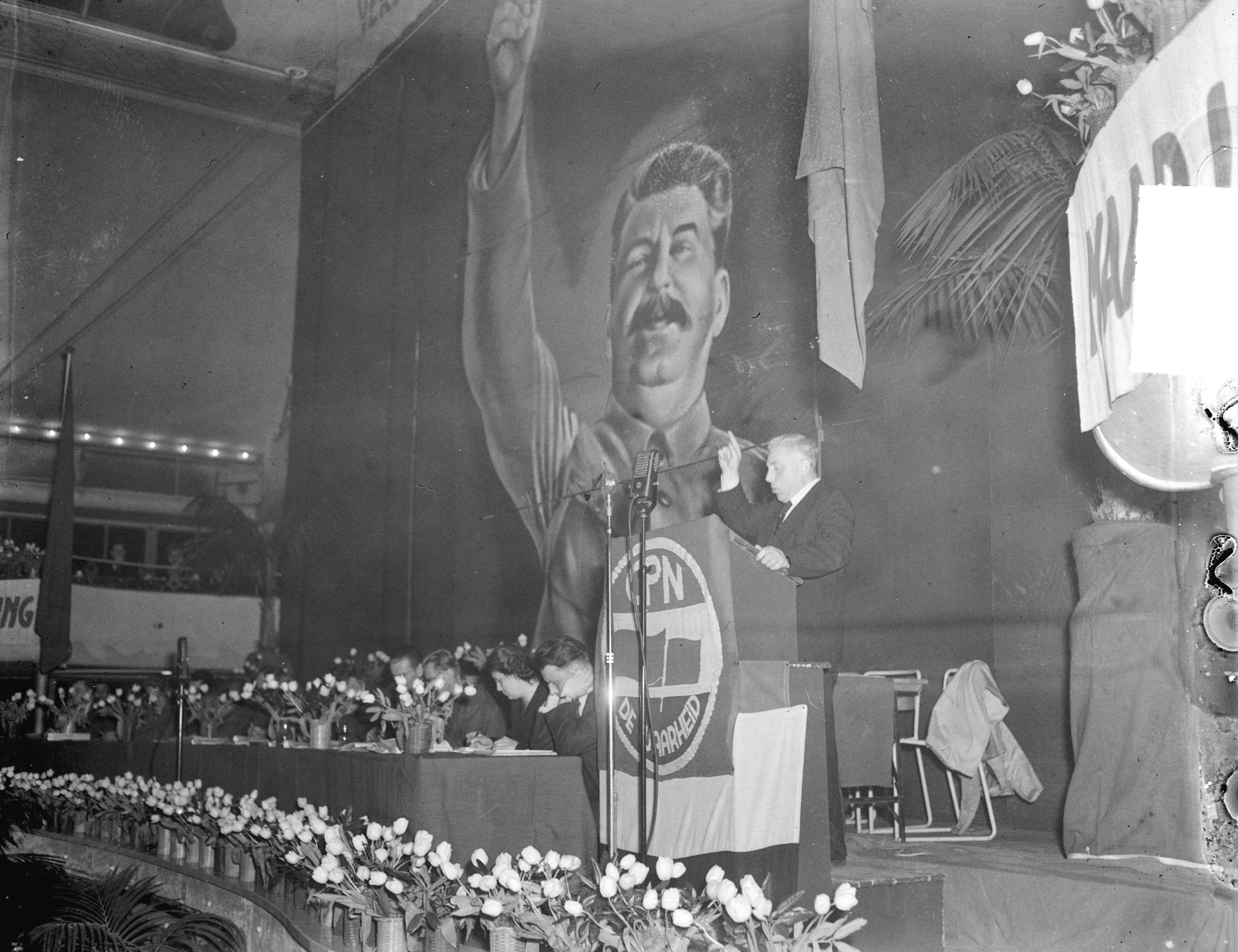
Paul de Groot speaking at a CPN conference, 1950

De Groot also entered the House of Representatives. There and in De Waarheid, of which he had become editor-in-chief, he sometimes defended contradictory views. For example, with regard to the young Indonesian republic: on the one hand he was against sending Dutch troops to violently crush the nationalist resistance in Java and elsewhere, but on the other hand he thought that young communists should be sent out and then propaganda within the army for Indonesian independence. In their own communist circle this led to confusion and dissatisfaction.

== Ideological struggle ==
In the years that followed, De Groot left a strong personal mark on the party. He remained a staunch Marxist-Leninist and assured the public that, in the event of a Third World War, the CPN would welcome the Soviet armies as liberators. This cost the party the sympathy and electoral support of some segments of the population. Its social isolation was further exacerbated by the CPN leadership’s stance on the Soviet suppression of the Hungarian uprising in 1956.

De Groot had serious reservations about the revisionist course of de-Stalinization that the new Russian party leader Nikita Khrushchev had embarked upon in 1956. He therefore took a stance on the ideological struggle within the CPN in early 1958, expelling former resistance members such as Gerben Wagenaar, Henk Gortzak, Frits Reuter, Bertus Brandsen and Rie Lips from the party. On the order of De Groot, Marcus Bakker wrote a report, "the little red book", titled "The CPN during the war", in which the expelled were criticised and labeled as traitors and Gestapo spies. In 1963, De Groot abruptly severed all ties with Moscow.

== End of board work ==
In 1962 De Groot stepped down as political secretary and was appointed party chairman. In 1966 he left the House of Representatives and a year later, at the 22nd party congress, he also resigned the presidency of the CPN. As an honorary member of the party board and director of the party's scientific office (IPSO), however, he continued to exercise decisive influence behind the scenes, such as in 1975 when the CPN decided to reconcile with Moscow.

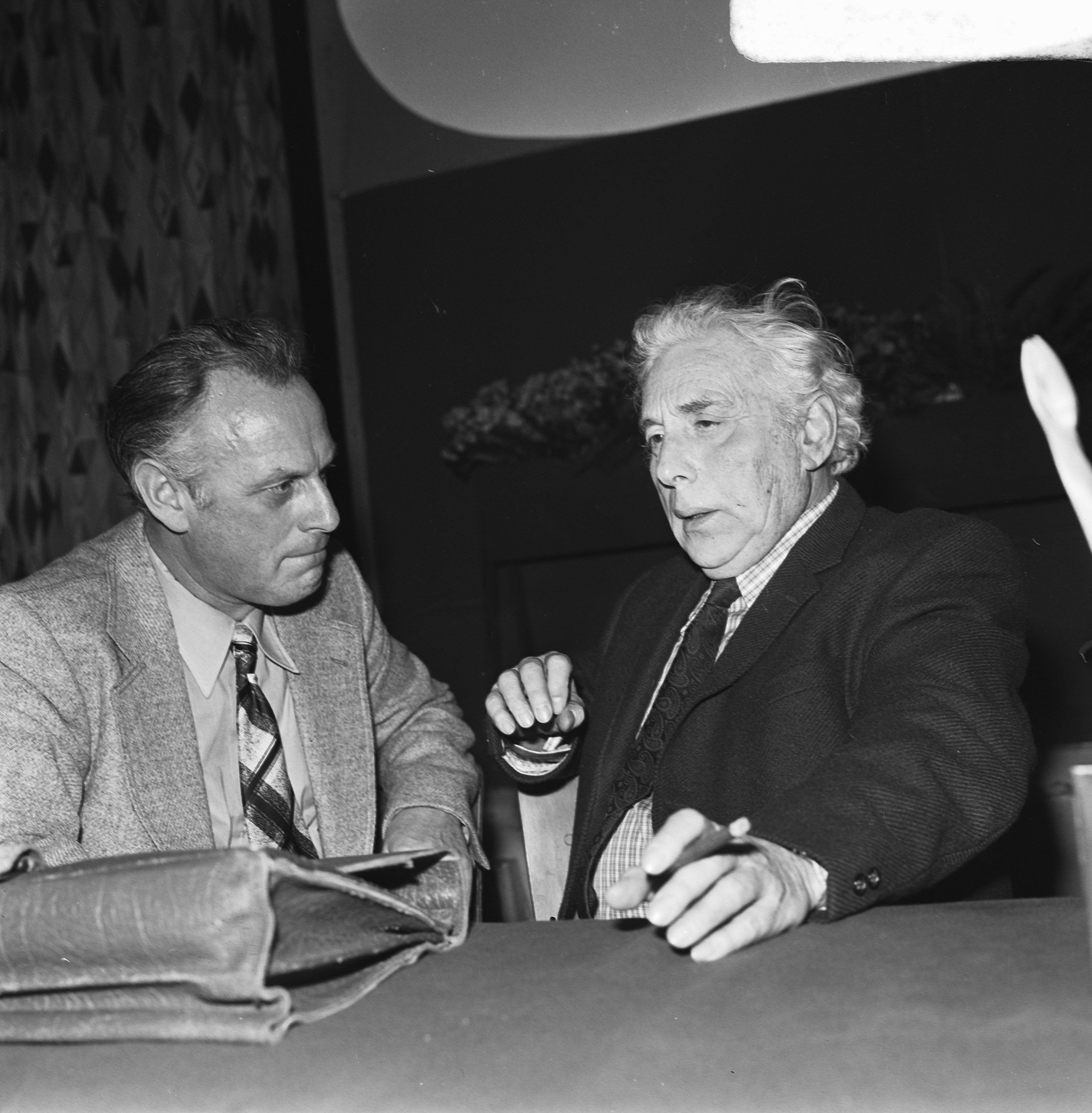
Henk Hoekstra with Paul de Groot, 1973

When the party suffered a dramatic election defeat in 1977 - the CPN dropped from seven to two parliamentary seats - De Groot attributed this to the party hierarchy having been fooled by "government machinations" surrounding the recent train hijacking at De Punt. He accused the party leadership of being too soft, young academics and social workers had increasingly taken the place of workers as members and administrators in the 1970s, and wanted to have them replaced by steeled cadres from the working class. With that, however, he overplayed his hand. The party board opposed and stripped him of honorary membership in 1978. De Groot's career had ended.

== Retirement ==
For the last ten years of his life, he lived a secluded life. Journalists and others who tried to approach were rebuffed. De Groot moved with his (second) wife to a care flat in Zeist and after her death, in September 1985, to a Jewish nursing home in Bussum. The disappearance of the CPN from the House of Representatives in 1986 did not elicit any public comment from him. After his own death, that same year, Paul de Groot was commemorated with a single column in De Waarheid.

== Bibliography ==
Cornelissen, Igor (1996). Paul de Groot, staatsvijand nr.1: een biografische schets. Amsterdam: Nijgh & Van Ditmar. ISBN 978-90-388-1379-0.
Stutje, Jan Willem (2000). De man die de weg wees: leven en werk van Paul de Groot 1899-1986. Amsterdam: Bezige Bij. ISBN 978-90-234-3908-0.
De Jong, Loe (1972). Het Koninkrijk der Nederlanden in de Tweede Wereldoorlog. Deel 4 – Mei '40 – maart '41 (2e band) (in Dutch). 's Gravenhage: Martinus Nijhoff.

Party political offices
Preceded by Louis de Visser	Leader of the Communist Party of the Netherlands; 1945–1963	Succeeded by Marcus Bakker
Preceded by Henk Gortzak	Parliamentary leader of the Communist Party of the Netherlands in the House of Representatives of the Netherlands; 1958–1963	Succeeded by Marcus Bakker
Unknown	Chairman of the Communist Party of the Netherlands; 1962–1968	Succeeded by Henk Hoekstra
