= Bertus Brandsen =

Dutch politician (1914–2001)

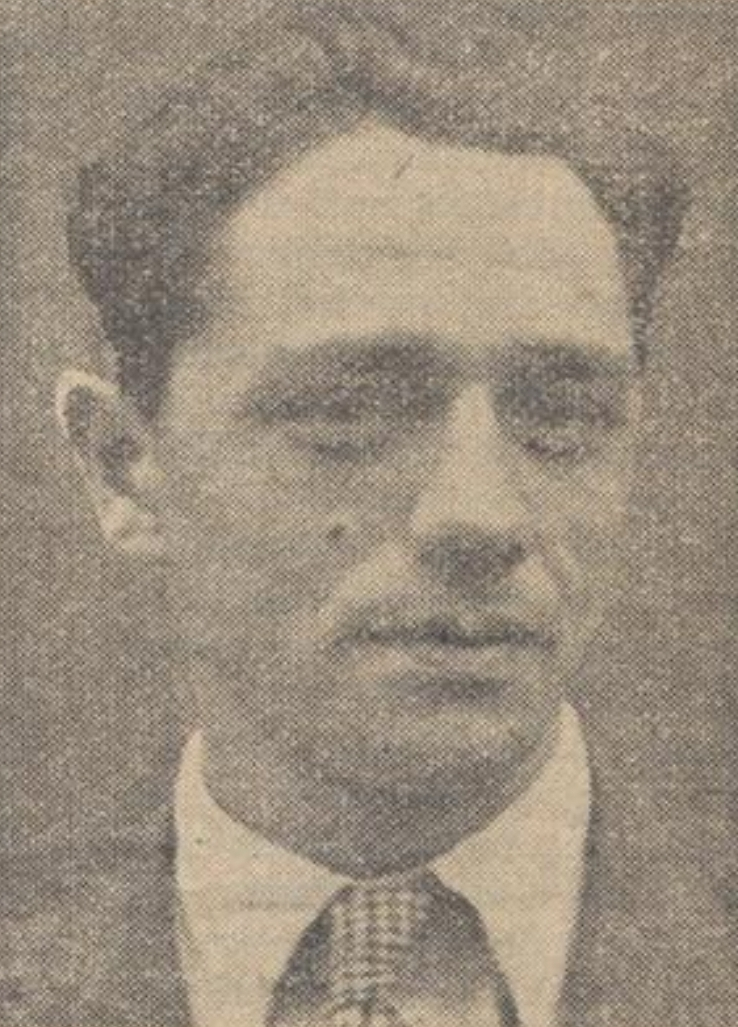

Member of the House of Representatives of the Netherlands
- In office 15 April 1958 – 20 March 1959

Personal details
- Born: Berend Brandsen; 28 October 1914 Utrecht, Netherlands
- Died: 23 August 2001 (aged 86) Amsterdam, Netherlands
- Party: Independent (from 1958)
- Other political affiliations: Communist Party of the Netherlands (1936–1958)
- Occupation: Politician; Trade Union Leader; Moldmaker

Berend "Bertus" Brandsen (28 October 1914 – 23 August 2001) was a Dutch politician of the defunct Communist Party of the Netherlands (CPN). He served as a Member of the House of Representatives from 15 April 1958 until 20 March 1959.
