= Communist Party of the Netherlands =

Political party in the Netherlands (1909–91)

Communist Party of the Netherlands Communistische Partij van Nederland
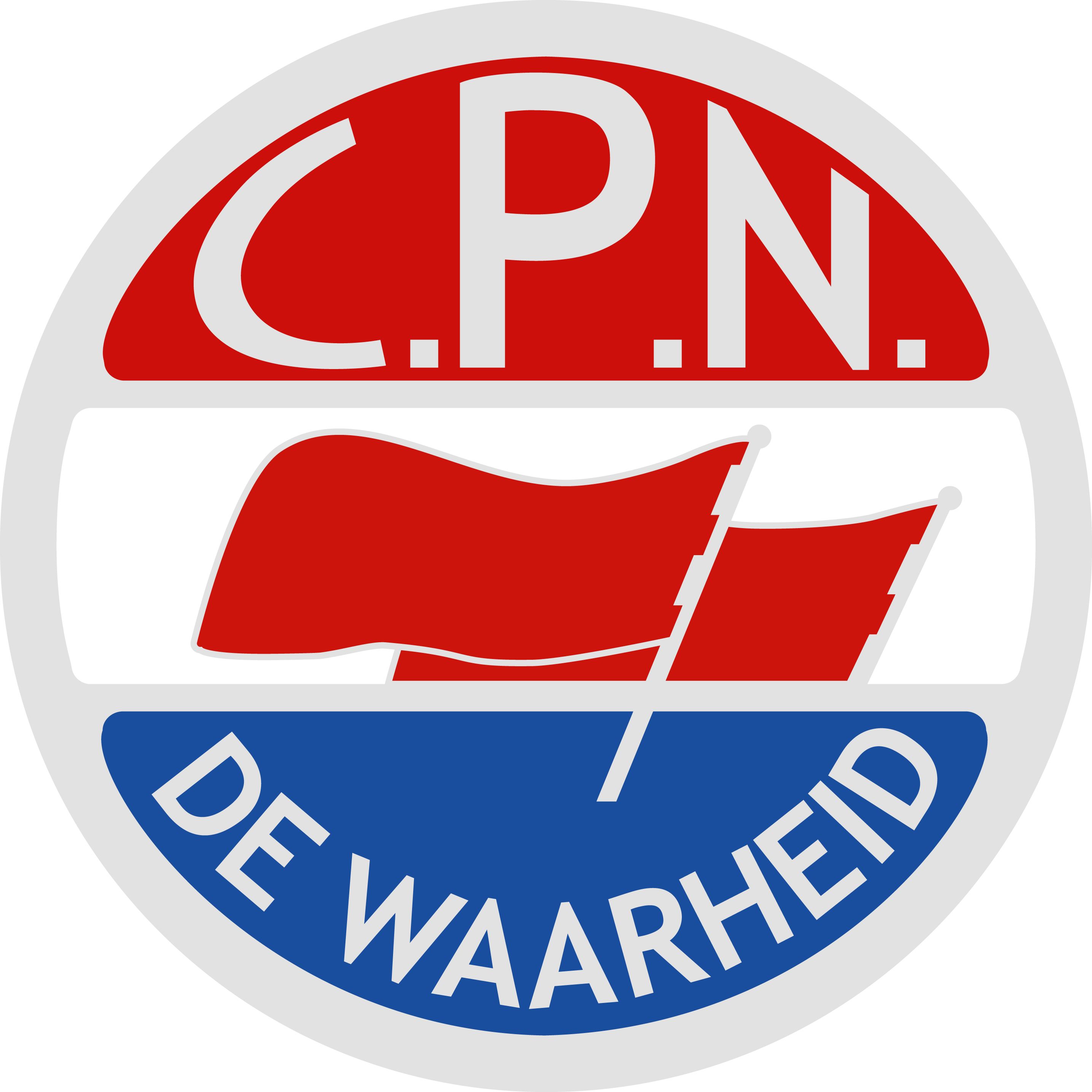
- Leader: David Wijnkoop (1909–1925); Louis de Visser (1925–1935); Ko Beuzemaker (1935–1939); Paul de Groot (1945–1967); Marcus Bakker (1967–1982); Ina Brouwer (1982–1991)
- Founded: 14 February 1909 (as the Social Democratic Party)
- Dissolved: 15 June 1991
- Merged into: GroenLinks
- Headquarters: Felix Meritis, Amsterdam
- Youth wing: General Dutch Youth League
- Ideology: Eurocommunism; Dutch republicanism Before 1980s: Marxism-Leninism
- Political position: Left-wing to Far-left
- European Parliament group: Grael
- International affiliation: Comintern (1919–1943); Cominform (1947–1956)
- Colours: Red

The Communist Party of the Netherlands (Dutch: Communistische Partij van Nederland [kɔmyˈnɪstisə pɑrˈtɛi vɑn ˈneːdərlɑnt], CPN) was a Eurocommunist party in the Netherlands. The party was founded in 1909 as the Social Democratic Party (SDP) and merged with the Pacifist Socialist Party, the Political Party of Radicals and the Evangelical People's Party in 1991, forming GroenLinks. Members opposed to the merger founded the New Communist Party–NCPN.

== History ==
=== Foundation ===
In 1907, Jan Ceton, Willem van Ravesteyn, and David Wijnkoop of the Social Democratic Workers' Party (SDAP) founded De Tribune ("The Tribune"), a magazine in which they criticized the party leadership. They maintained orthodox Marxist views and expected a proletarian revolution. They opposed the leadership of the SDAP, who were more oriented towards more a revisionist ideology and a parliamentary and reformist political strategy. At a party congress in Deventer held on 14 February 1909, SDAP leaders demanded that they stop publishing De Tribune or be expelled from the party. Wijnkoop and Ceton refused; they and their supporters, including the poet Herman Gorter and the mathematician Gerrit Mannoury, left to form a new party. This was the first such split in a Western European socialist party, although others followed. There had already been a split between the Bolsheviks and Mensheviks in the Russian Social Democratic Labour Party, and between the Bulgarian Workers' Social Democratic Party and the Tesnjaki ("Narrowist") group. On 14 March 1909 the dissenters founded the new Social Democratic Party (SDP). They had a membership of around 400 spread across different cities: Amsterdam (160), Rotterdam (65), The Hague (45), Leiden (56), Utrecht (25), Bussum (15).

=== 1909–1922 ===
In the 1910s, the SDAP paid much attention to attacking the newly formed SDP. The mobilization for World War I, which the SDAP supported and the SDP opposed, further strengthened the differences between the parties. In the 1917 general election the SDP was still unable to win any seats. In May 1918, the left wing founded the journal De Internationale, uniting four opposition groups within the SDP, with groups in Amsterdam, Rotterdam and The Hague plus the Zimmerwald Left Propaganda Union. This group did not favour the parliamentarianism of the majority.

The Russian Revolution fractured most European parties between their revolutionary and reformist factions; this had already happened in the Netherlands, but it profoundly changed the SDP. Previously a party of orthodox Marxist intellectuals with little working class support, the SDP saw an influx of members coming from the free socialist organisations, primarily the NAS.

The SDP entered the election again in July 1918, winning two seats that were occupied by Willem van Ravesteyn and Wijnkoop; Wijnkoop assumed the leadership of the party. The SDP formed a revolutionary parliamentary party with the League of Christian Socialists and the Socialist Party, both of which had one seat. In 1921, Willy Kruyt, the MP for the League of Christian Socialists, joined the SDP while the MP for the Socialist Party left the revolutionary parliamentary party.

As the German Revolution (and the related Brussels Soldiers' Council) developed across the borders in November 1918, the Netherlands was also affected by strikes and mutinies. On 10 November, the SDP called for the formation of soldiers' and workers councils with a view to forming a popular government. A week later at their Leiden Congress, the party name was changed to Communist Party Holland (CPH), to stress its identification with the workers councils. The following year, on 10 April 1919 the CPH joined the Comintern, which helped transform the party from a mix of anarchists, syndicalists and orthodox Marxists into a tightly-knit Leninist community.

In 1920, prominent left communists Gorter and Pannekoek left the party to form the Communist Workers' Party of the Netherlands which advocated council communism. In the 1922 general election the CPH retained its two seats. One of its unsuccessful candidates that year, Tan Malaka, was the first subject of the colonial Dutch East Indies to run for office in the Netherlands.

=== 1922–1945 ===
Before the 1925 general election, Wijnkoop was replaced as party leader by Louis de Visser under the pressure of the Comintern; this was the cause of heavy internal division within the party. Jacques de Kadt had already left the party in 1924 to help set up The League of Communist Struggle & Propaganda Clubs. In the background of several of these divisions was the conflict in the Soviet Union between Joseph Stalin and Leon Trotsky. Wijnkoop, Henk Sneevliet (a prominent international communist and an ally of Trotsky), and other prominent members, were expelled from the party. Sneevliet founded the Revolutionary Socialist Union, which later became the Revolutionary Socialist Party (RSP). In 1926, the entire Rotterdam branch was expelled. These expellees joined Wijnkoop to form a separate Communist Party of Holland-Central Committee. All three, the RSP, the CPH-central committee and the old CPH (which ran under the name "CPH – Dutch section of the Communist International"), contested the 1929 general election and both CPHs won one seat each, whilst the RSP failed to win any. In 1930, the CPHs were forced to merge by the Comintern.

After the mutiny on the Zeven Provinciën in the same year, the independence of the Dutch Indies became an important theme at the 1933 general election. The party performed particularly well at this election, doubling its seats to four. Among those elected was the Indonesian nationalist Rustam Effendi, the first subject from the Dutch Indies to enter parliament. At the 1937 general election, the party was able to retain its seats.

On 15 May 1940, immediately after the German occupation, the party decided to organize an underground movement. In the first few months of the war however, party leadership, led by Paul de Groot, at first attempted to operate legally, and after negotiations with the occupier one last edition of two party periodicals were allowed to appear in which the party blamed the war on British imperialism and the Dutch bourgeoisie and called for a "correct stance" towards the occupying Germans.

Nevertheless, in July 1940, the Nazi occupation force banned the CPN; the party continued illegally. In 1940, together with the much smaller anti-Stalinist communist Revolutionary Socialist Party, the only pre-war organisation that had protested against the anti-Semitic measures by the German occupiers, it founded a resistance movement called Raad van Verzet ("Resistance Council"). It published a resistance newspaper called De Waarheid (The Truth). Both took part in the February strike in 1941, the largest act of resistance in the Netherlands. Many Dutch communists would go on to fight in the Dutch resistance, of which a large amount, including most of the pre-World War II party leadership, would perish.

=== 1945–1963 ===
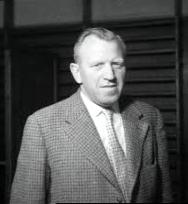
Gerben Wagenaar in 1956

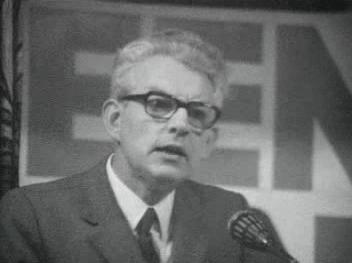
Marcus Bakker in 1972

After the war, the party was led by Paul de Groot, who had a strong grip on the party's organization. Initially, De Groot had wanted to organise into the Union of Friends of De Waarheid (Vereniging Vrienden van de Waarheid) movement, which was to aid in building a new broader progressive political party. However, under pressure from many Dutch communists and the Soviet Union, which had earlier condemned the CPUSA's erstwhile leader Earl Browder for dissolving his party, the party was refounded on 23 June 1945.

In 1945 the CPN's Gerben Wagenaar was offered the position of minister without portfolio in the Schermerhorn–Drees cabinet, mainly because of the CPN's role in the Dutch Resistance. The CPN refused, demanding instead the position of Minister of Food Supply, Agriculture and Fisheries for Paul de Groot. In the 1946 general election, the CPN received nearly 11% of the vote and won 10 seats in the House of Representatives. The CPN also won seats in the Senate for the first time. This electoral success was linked to the role of the CPN in the resistance.

The following period was characterized by decreasing popularity for communism, the rise of internal divisions, and the methodical isolation of the CPN by other parties.

With the rise of the Cold War, the party began to lose popularity. The 1948 Czechoslovak coup d'état tainted the reputation of Communism. In the 1948 general election, the party lost two seats. In 1949, a group of Frisian Communists were removed from the party ranks; they founded the Socialist Union, but they were unable to play a significant role in Dutch politics. In the 1952 general election, the party lost two additional seats. In 1956, the CPN lost votes again; however, because of the expansion of parliament it won an additional seat. The party supported the Russian intervention against the Hungarian Revolution of 1956. After the invasion, the party office, in Felix Meritis in Amsterdam, was attacked by opponents of the invasion.

Meanwhile, internal dissent against the strict leadership of De Groot was rising. In 1958, the Bruggroep ("Bridge group") left the CPN in a conflict over the role of the communist Unity Trade Union Federation (Eenheidsvakcentrale). Leaders of the Bruggroep were prominent Resistance figures like Gerben Wagenaar and Henk Gortzak. The General Intelligence and Security Service (AIVD) claimed to be behind the split, while the CPN leadership claimed that the dissenters were agents working for the U.S. Central Intelligence Agency. The Bruggroep founded a new party, the Socialist Workers' Party (SWP). In 1957, the Pacifist Socialist Party was founded. The PSP united former members of the CPN, including members of the Socialist Union, and the Labour Party (PvdA), and other left-wing independents. In the following 1959 general election the CPN lost all but three seats, while the PSP won two seats, and the SWP was unable to win any seats. Many SWP members, like Gortzak, later joined the PSP.

In the 1940s and 1950s, the CPN was methodically isolated by other parties. Civil servants were forbidden to become members of the CPN and from 1948 was not alloted airtime during the Zendtijd voor Politieke Partijen for political broadcasts on public radio or television due to the CPN's opposition to the Dutch political system. The party's unequivocal support for decolonization of the Dutch East Indies isolated the party in parliament. Because of its anti-NATO and European Economic Community stances the party was blocked from the Foreign Affairs, Defense, and Nuclear Energy committees in parliament. The AIVD kept close tabs on the party. All other parties in parliament were deeply anti-communist, especially the social democratic PvdA.

In the 1963 general election the party gained one seat. The developing students' movement was an important impetus for the party. In 1964, the international conflict between the People's Republic of China and the USSR also split the CPN. A group called Communist Unity Movement of the Netherlands (Marxist–Leninist) left the CPN in that year. They went through several intense splits based on ideological and personal conflicts. In 1971 one of the small groups formed the Socialist Party, which became a successful political party from the mid-1990s. The CPN took a rather ambiguous stance in the conflict between the USSR and the PRC.

=== 1967–1989 ===
1977 election poster which reads "Van Agt out, CPN in"

Before the 1967 general election De Groot was replaced by Marcus Bakker. De Groot was made an honorary member of the CPN. The party won another seat, making the total five. The CPN condemned the Soviet intervention against the Prague Spring. In 1971 yet another seat was added, and in 1972 the party had seven seats. The 1977 general election saw a conflict between the social democrat Joop den Uyl and the Christian democrat Dries van Agt. Many CPN sympathizers voted for the social democratic PvdA and the CPN lost all but two seats. In 1978, under pressure from new young members, De Groot lost his honorary membership. In the 1981 general election, the placement of American nuclear weapons is a major issue. The CPN, which led one of the most prominent campaigning groups, the Committee against the N-bomb, was rewarded with another seat.

In the 1982 elections, the party got its first mayor in the Communist stronghold of Beerta. Before the general election of the same year Marcus Bakker stepped down in favour of Ina Brouwer. With her a new generation of younger, often female MPs entered politics. She was able to keep the three seats. The CPN tried to renew its political program, emphasizing New Left issues like feminism and gay rights. In reaction to this working class-oriented members founded the Horizontal Council of Communists (called so because they were members from different local branches, breaking the vertical organization of democratic centralism). The group tried to pressure the CPN into returning to its Old Left course. In 1983 they left the party and formed the League of Communists in the Netherlands (VCN, Verbond van Communisten In Nederland). In 1986, both the CPN and VCN contested the elections. Neither won a seat in the House of Representatives. The CPN still had two senators. As one of the last acts of the party, the party leadership attended the festivities surrounding the 40th anniversary of the German Democratic Republic.

=== Dissolution ===
In 1989, the party merged with three other small left-wing parties, namely the Pacifist Socialist Party (PSP), the left-wing Christian Political Party of Radicals (PPR) and the Evangelical People's Party (EVP) to form the GroenLinks. In 1991, the party officially disbanded; the VCN was joined by other former members of the CPN, who left because they disagreed with the new course, and founded the New Communist Party–NCPN, which still exists today.

There is no influence left of the old Marxist wing of the CPN in GroenLinks. The "new" generation has been very prominent: Ina Brouwer led the party in the 1994 general election and one of the party's senators Jos van der Lans was a member of the CPN. The former party chair who was very influential in the formulation of the new liberal course, Herman Meijer, was one of the gay rights activists who joined the CPN in the 1970s.

=== Name ===
The CPN changed its name two times. It was founded as Sociaal-Democratische Partij (Social-Democratic party; SDP). It followers were commonly known as "Tribunists" after their main organ. After the Russian Revolution the term social-democracy became linked to the reformist socialists, while the term communist was linked to Leninist revolutionary socialism. All sections of the Comintern were obliged to adopt the name 'Communist Party'. In 1919 the party changed its name to Communistische Partij Holland (Communist Party Holland; CPH). The name implied that the CPH was the Dutch section of the worldwide Communist International. In 1935 the party changed its name to Communistische Partij van Nederland (Communist Party of the Netherlands; CPN), to express its allegiance to the Netherlands and Dutch institutions.

== Ideology and issues ==
=== Ideological development ===
The SDP was founded as an orthodox Marxist party advocating an economic and social revolution that would overthrow the capitalist economic and political system, in favour for a socialist dictatorship of the proletariat, which would in turn evolve into a classless, communist society. They broke away from the SDAP, when the reformist leadership blocked their publication of an autonomous journal.

After the Russian Revolution, the party adopted the name Communist. With the departure of the left-wing grouped around De Internationale, the party adopted Marxism–Leninism, the official ideology of the USSR and the Comintern. This advocated the overthrow of the state by a vanguard party, which would lead the country towards socialism. The party remained faithful to the USSR's version of Marxism–Leninism during the 1920s, when Trotsky's interpretation became an important ideological competitor of Joseph Stalin's. This led to a split when a group around a prominent ally of Trotsky, Henk Sneevliet, left the party to form the Revolutionary Socialist Party (RSP).

In the 1960s, the party did not choose sides in the conflict between the People's Republic of China and the USSR. Nevertheless, a Maoist group, called the Communist Unity Movement of the Netherlands split from the Party. In the 1970s and 1980s, the Party began to move away from its Marxist/Leninist roots and began embrace a more libertarian and Eurocommunist programme with a strong emphasis on feminism.

=== Social policy ===
The Communist Party has always been an advocate of the interests of the working class as shown by their advocacy of higher wages and lower prices. They also campaigned for work conditions in factories should be improved, that child labour should be banned completely, that the work day should be regulated and that laws against striking should be repealed.

The CPN advocated a strong role of the state in the economy. They believed the state should supply cheap housing, free and neutral education and health care insurance. They felt that important industries should be nationalized in the short term and in the long term the entire economy should be planned, that taxation should be progressive and that those without jobs should receive benefits.

=== Foreign policy ===
The communist movement emerged from other strands of the workers movement because of their vigorous opposition to World War I. After 1918, the recognition of the USSR and the independence of Indonesia became important issues. During World War II the party was active in the resistance movement. After the war, its foreign policy was explicitly anti-West German and pro-USSR. It favoured Soviet interventions in Czechoslovakia and Hungary and sought Dutch recognition of East Germany. It opposed Dutch membership of NATO and the European Economic Community. In the 1970s and 1980s its policy became more critical of the USA, supporting the National Front for the Liberation of South Vietnam in the Vietnam War. It played an important role in the popular opposition against the placement of nuclear weapons in the Netherlands.

=== Domestic issues ===
The party also emphasised the radical democratisation of the Dutch political system. It opposed monarchy. It sought to abolish the Council of State and the Senate. A referendum and trial by jury should be implemented. Citizens should appoint civil servants.

In the 1970s and 1980s the party began to embrace New Left issues like the fight for women's and gay rights.

== Representation ==
=== House of Representatives ===
Election	Lead candidate	List	Votes		Seats	Ref.
Election	Lead candidate	List	No.	%	Seats	Ref.
1922	David Wijnkoop	List	53,664	1.83	2 / 100	
1925	Lou de Visser	List	36,770	1.19	1 / 100	
1929	Lou de Visser	List	65,051	2.06	1 / 100	
1933	Lou de Visser	List	118,238	3.18	4 / 100	
1937	Lou de Visser	List	136,026	3.35	4 / 100	
1946	Gerben Wagenaar	List	502,963	10.56	10 / 100	
1948	Gerben Wagenaar	List	382,001	7.74	8 / 100	
1952	Henk Gortzak	List	328,621	6.16	6 / 100	
1956	Henk Gortzak	List	272,054	4.75	7 / 150	
1959	Paul de Groot	List	144,542	2.41	3 / 150	
1963	Paul de Groot	List	173,322	2.77	4 / 150	
1967	Marcus Bakker	List	248,318	3.61	5 / 150	
1971	Marcus Bakker	List	246,569	3.90	6 / 150	
1972	Marcus Bakker	List	330,398	4.47	7 / 150	
1977	Marcus Bakker	List	143,481	1.73	2 / 150	
1981	Marcus Bakker	List	178,292	2.05	3 / 150	
1982	Ina Brouwer	List	147,753	1.79	3 / 150	
1986	Ina Brouwer	List	57,847	0.63	0 / 150	

=== Senate ===
Election	Lead candidate	List	Votes		Seats	Ref.
Election	Lead candidate	List	No.	%	Seats	Ref.
1946		List			4 / 50	
1948		List			4 / 50	
1951		List			3 / 50	
1952		List			2 / 50	
1955		List			2 / 50	
June 1956		List			1 / 50	
October 1956		List			4 / 75	
1960		List			2 / 75	
1963		List			1 / 75	
1966		List			1 / 75	
1969		List			1 / 75	
1971		List			3 / 75	
1974		List			4 / 75	
1977		List			2 / 75	
1980		List			1 / 75	
1981		List			1 / 75	
1983		List			2 / 75	
1986		List			2 / 75	
1987		List			1 / 75	

=== European Parliament ===
Name	Start of term	End of term	Ref.
Nel van Dijk	31 January 1987	1989	
Wessel Hartog	17 October 1974	September 1976	

=== Municipal and provincial government ===
Although the CPN was particularly strong in several provinces, especially Groningen, it never cooperated in any provincial executive.

The party supplied only one mayor, namely Hanneke Jagersma in the CPN stronghold of Beerta. In the late 1940s, the CPN participated in several municipal executives but after the USSR's intervention in Hungary, these all fell. In the 1950s the party got an absolute majority in the municipal council of Finsterwolde the municipality was consequently put under control of the national government. In the 1980s the party again started to cooperate with other parties in local governments.

The following table shows the results of the provincial election of 1962 by province. It shows the areas where the CPN was strong, namely North Holland and to a lesser extent Groningen and South Holland. The party was very weak in rural and Catholic Limburg and Brabant.

Province	Result (seats)
Groningen	2
Friesland	1
Drenthe	1
Overijssel	1
Gelderland	0
Utrecht	0
North Holland	6
South Holland	2
Zeeland	0
North Brabant	0
Limburg	0

== Electorate ==
The support for the SDP, which was founded before the introduction of universal suffrage, was strong among left-wing intellectuals and educated working class circles. This was mainly limited to Amsterdam and Rotterdam. With the introduction of universal suffrage, the SDP, and later CPH began to branch out to the poorest circles of the working classes. In poor rural areas of the province of Groningen, the Zaanstreek, around Zaandam in North Holland, and the port cities of Amsterdam and Rotterdam the party was especially strong. After the Second World War, the CPN branched out to the and other poor rural areas like West Friesland. In some Groningen municipalities like Finsterwolde, Beerta, the party won near absolute majorities. In these municipalities, which merged into Reiderland and are today part of Oldambt, the refounded CPN, NCPN still performed well into the 2000s, and a NCPN splinter group, the United Communist Party (Netherlands), still holds 3 seats on the Oldambt municipal council. In the 1950s public support for the CPN weakened with the rise of Cold War. In the 1960s and 1970s the CPN began to gain support from students. In the 1980s the party lost much of its working class support.

== Organization ==
=== Organizational structure ===
The party was organized on the principle of democratic centralism. The party's board was the highest organ of the party, it decided the order of candidates on election lists for the Senate, House of Representatives and European Parliament, had the final say over the party program and had the ability to expel members. It was elected by the party's Congress. The party saw its political unity and strong discipline as conditions for its ideological zeal.

Between 1946 and 1980, the party's headquarters was in Felix Meritis in Amsterdam.

=== Linked and pillarized organisations ===
The party had a small, but strong communist pillar around it. Important organizations were the communist trade union, the Red Trade Union Federation (Rode Vakcentrale) before 1940 and the Unity Trade Union Federation (Eenheidsvakcentrale) between 1945 and 1958, and the party's paper, De Tribune (the Tribune) before 1940 and De Waarheid (The Truth), which was founded as a resistance paper and named after its Soviet counterpart after 1940. The party's youth organization was the formally independent General Dutch Youth League. The party's scientific organization was the Instituut voor Politiek en Sociaal Onderzoek (Institute for Political and Social Research) which published Politiek en Cultuur (Politics and Culture). The CPN had its own publisher called Pegasus.

=== International organisations ===
Since 1918, the party was a member of the Third International, first in the form of the Comintern, and after 1947 in the Cominform.

=== Relationships to other parties ===
For a long time the communists were methodically isolated, partially because of its revolutionary ideology and partially because of the antagonistic style of its politics. The communists used this style to prevent its electorate from moving to its competitors.

The relationship between the Social Democratic Workers' Party (before World War II) and the Labour Party (PvdA, after World War II) was always troublesome. The SDP split from the SDAP over ideological differences, orthodox Marxist, revolutionary politics versus revisionist and reformist politics. The social democrats saw the communists as insignificant while the communists taunted the social democrats by calling them "servants to capitalism" and "social fascists". During the Cold War, the PvdA embraced Atlanticism, NATO and the alliance with the United States, while the CPN advocated stronger links with the USSR. The PvdA had the strongest anti-communists in its ranks. During the 1970s when a more leftist PvdA advocated a broad progressive coalition, they still excluded the CPN.

The relationship between left-wing splinter groups and the communists was notoriously bad. The CPH ignored the Revolutionary Socialist Party during its four-year term in the 1930s. The Pacifist Socialist Party, which was partially composed of those expelled from the CPN, was denounced as a party of agents of the U.S. Central Intelligence Agency. The CPN methodically voted against proposals of the PSP, even when they supported them. In the 1980s the PSP and the CPN grew closer as they both campaigned against nuclear armament and both began to embrace New Left and libertarian politics. In 1984 they formed a common list for the European Election together with the green Political Party of Radicals (PPR) and the Greens. In the 1989 the CPN, PSP and PPR were joined by the left-wing Christian Evangelical People's Party in the formation of the GroenLinks.

Relationships with the other parties, whether liberal or Christian democratic, were very poor.

== International comparison ==
The CPN is one of the few communist parties to be formed before the Russian Revolution. It lies between the Northern European communist parties, like the Communist Party of Sweden and the Southern European communist parties, like the Italian Communist Party. Like its Italian counterparts, and unlike its Swedish counterparts it was methodically isolated in parliament. Like its Swedish counterparts, but unlike its Italian counterparts, it gained around 5% of the vote. Like its Italian counterpart it was closely linked to Moscow until the 1960s. In the 1970s, it became involved in New Left politics, like its Swedish counterpart.
