= Charlotte Garske =

German political activist against Nazism (1906–1943)

- Born: Charlotte Schaepe; December 4, 1906; Berlin, German Empire
- Died: December 16, 1943 (aged 37); Plötzensee Prison, Berlin, Nazi Germany
- Monuments: Memorial stone at lakeside camping place
- Other name: Lotte Garske
- Occupations: Accountant, political activist
- Known for: Anti-Nazi resistance
- Political party: Communist Party of Germany (KPD)
- Movement: German resistance to Nazism
- Spouse: Erich Garske (m. 1933)
- Children: 1

Charlotte "Lotte" Garske (born Charlotte Schaepe: 4 December 1906 – 16 December 1943) was a German political activist who resisted the country's Nazi Government. She was executed in Plötzensee Prison on 16 December 1943.

== Life ==
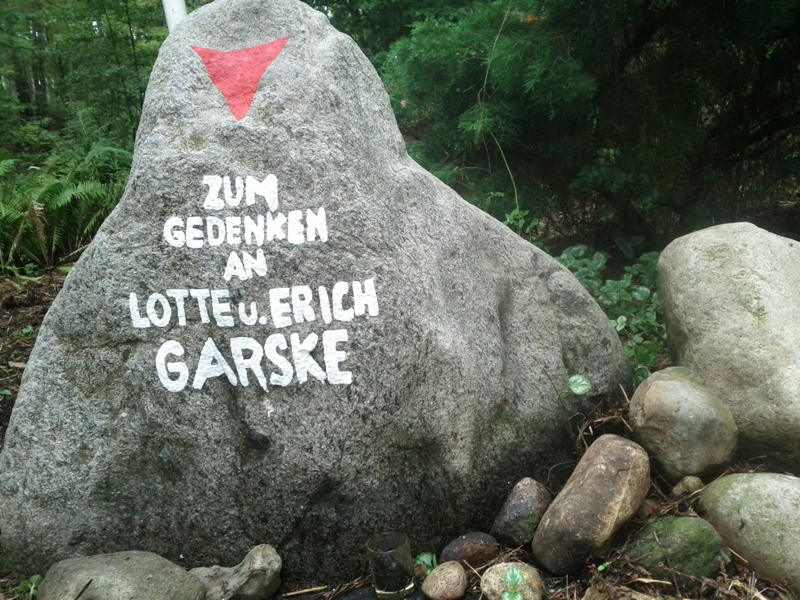
The memorial stone to the Garskes was erected in 1944 by their friends at a lakeside camping place where they often stayed. Predating the collapse of the Nazi régime, it is one of the earliest public memorials in Germany to Nazi victims. It was renovated – washed and repainted – in 2013. The memorial enjoys "protected" status.

Charlotte "Lotte" Schaepe was born in Berlin. Following a commercial apprenticeship she took a job as an accountant. When, in 1933, she married the building worker (later a builder's draftsman) Erich Garske, it was her second marriage. She already had a child from her first marriage which in 1930 had ended in divorce.

Lotte Garske was a member of the Communist Party of Germany. It was through party work, and shared membership of the Fichte Sports Association, that she had met Erich. Following abrupt régime change in January 1933 Germany was rapidly transformed into a one-party dictatorship. After the Reichstag fire at the end of February 1933, the government instantly blamed "communists" and targeted for surveillance or arrest people who had been listed as Communist party members before the rules had been changed. However, the Garskes neither stopped being communists nor emigrated. Indeed, when the Communist Party in exile smuggled people back into Germany from Moscow or Paris to work on party matters, one of the places where they might be hidden and accommodated was in the Garskes' apartment in central Berlin. As early as 1934 they secretly accommodated Eugen Schwebinghaus, a close party colleague of Robert Stamm. From 1942 their Berlin apartment was the work-place and a communications hub for Wilhelm Knöchel, an exceptionally effective communist resistance organiser, whose alias was "Alfred". Erich Garske was able to help Knöchel in his work by producing satirical drawings and other art work for illegal party publications, notably with a news journal called "Der Friedenskämpfer" ("The Fighter for Peace"). Gestapo reports indicated that Charlotte Garske was suspected of being significantly more important to the political work of "Alfred" than her husband. She acted as a courier, delivering illegal published material to Willi Seng, a communist party instructor and co-ordinator in the economically and politically crucial Ruhr region. She also organised meetings of others operating on behalf of the exiled communist party central committee.

By the end of 1944 none of the people named above was alive. Erich Garske and Knöchel were arrested at the Garskes' home by the Gestapo on 30 January 1943. Charlotte was arrested on 17 February 1943. On 9 November 1943 the special "People's Court" sentenced Erich and Charlotte Garske to death. Erich was killed – sources use the verb "murdered" – on 13 December 1943, Charlotte Garske on 16 December 1943, both at the Plötzensee Prison at Berlin-Plötzensee.
