= Kees Schalker =

Dutch politician (1890–1942)

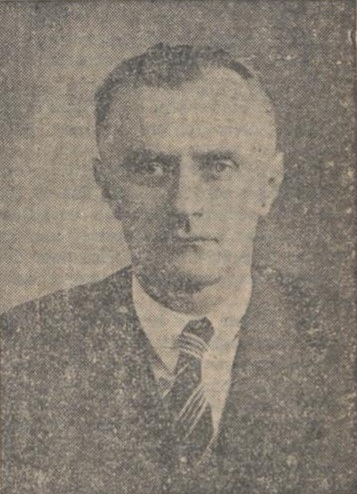
- Portrait of Kees Schalker on the newspaper De Tribune, 1934
- Born: Cornelis Johannes Pieter Schalker; 31 July 1890; The Hague, Netherlands
- Died: 13 January 1942 (aged 51); Waalsdorpervlakte
- Resting place: Crooswijk General Cemetery
- Occupation: Clerk
- Political party: Communist Party of the Netherlands

Cornelis Johannes Pieter "Kees" Schalker (31 July 1890 – 13 January 1942) was a Dutch communist politician and resistance fighter against Nazi occupation.

Schalker attended the elementary and commercial evening school in Delft and worked there as a commercial clerk until 1933. In 1914 he joined the Social Democratic Workers' Party (SDAP) but in 1916, switched to the Orthodox Marxist Social Democratic Party (SDP), which was renamed the Communist Party of Holland (CPH) in November 1918 and the Communist Party of the Netherlands (CPN) in 1935.

From December 1919 to April 1929 Schalker was a member of the Delft municipal council and from September 1931 to July 1937 of the Amsterdam municipal council. From July 1933 to June 1937 he was a member of the Second Chamber of the Dutch Parliament, where he was his party's spokesman for agriculture and foreign policy. In his position Schalker also defended the interests of German refugees from Nazi Germany and criticized the Dutch government's cooperation with the Gestapo.

In 1925 Schalker was elected to the Central Committee (CC) of the CPN. In 1929/30 Schalker worked as secretary of the South Holland Provincial Committee of the CPH. From 1930 he was political secretary of the Central Committee of the CPN. At the VII World Congress of the Comintern in the summer of 1935 he was elected a candidate for the Executive Committee of the Communist International. In 1937/1938 he represented the CPN at the Comintern in Moscow. In 1938 he became secretary of the Central Committee of the CPN and was chairman of the Rotterdam CPN from 1938 until his death. In 1939/40 he was a member of the Rotterdam municipal council.

After the occupation of the Netherlands by the Germany in May 1940, Schalker became a member of the illegal leadership of the CPN and organizer of the illegal party newspaper De Waarheid, which first appeared in November 1940. He took an active part in the resistance against the Nazi occupiers, being in charge of the underground communist resistance in the region of The Hague, also known as the De Vonk group, which led to his capture and arrest in Utrecht on 14 November 1943 and imprisoned in the Scheveningen prison - the so-called "Oranjehotel". On 12 February 1944 he was shot in the Waalsdorpervlakte as part of German reprisals to Dutch resistance attacks in Rotterdam. In 1946 his body was found during an excavation and officially interred at the Crooswijk General Cemetery.
