= Hermann Weber =

German historian and political scientist (1928–2014)

- Born: 23 August 1928; Mannheim, Baden, Germany
- Died: 29 December 2014 (aged 86); Mannheim, Baden, Germany
- Occupation: Historian
- Political party: KPD (1945–1954); SPD (1955–2014)
- Spouse: Gerda Röder/Weber

Hermann Weber (23 August 1928 – 29 December 2014) was a German historian and political scientist. He has been described as "the man who knew everything about the German Democratic Republic".

== Life ==
=== Early years ===
Hermann Weber was born into a working-class family in the closing years of what would later become known as the Weimar Republic period. His father was a metal worker. When Weber was 4 years old, membership in the Communist Party of Germany (KPD) was banned by the Nazi Party. This impacted his family greatly – Weber's father was a Communist who found himself harassed and at one stage thrown into prison for a year and a half by the Gestapo.

=== Published output (not a complete list) ===
==== As author ====
- with Andreas Herbst: Deutsche Kommunisten. Biographisches Handbuch 1918–1945. 2nd edition: revised and much extended, Berlin 2008, ISBN 978-3-320-02130-6.

Deutsche Kommunisten – Supplement to the above 1918-1945. Dietz Verlag, Berlin 2013, ISBN 978-3-320-02295-2.

- with Gerda Weber: Leben nach dem „Prinzip links“. Erinnerungen aus fünf Jahrzehnten. Links, Berlin 2006, ISBN 3-86153-405-3.
- Damals als ich Wunderlich hieß. Vom Parteihochschüler zum kritischen Sozialisten. Die SED-Parteihochschule „Karl Marx“ bis 1949. Aufbau, Berlin 2002, ISBN 3-351-02535-1.
- Erich Walter Gniffke. In: Karl Wilhelm Fricke, Peter Steinbach, Johannes Tuchel (Ed.): Opposition und Widerstand in der DDR – Politische Lebensbilder. Beck, 2002, ISBN 3-406-47619-8, S. 203–209.
- Die DDR 1945–1990. (Grundriss der Geschichte, Bd. 20). 5th (updated) edition. Oldenbourg Wissenschaftsverlag, München 2012, ISBN 978-3-486-70440-2.
- Geschichte der DDR. Deutscher Taschenbuch-Verlag, München 1985, ISBN 3-423-04430-6.
- with Gerda Weber: Lenin-Chronik, Daten zu Leben und Werk. Deutscher Taschenbuch Verlag, München 1974, ISBN 3-423-03254-5.
- Aufbau und Fall einer Diktatur. Kritische Beiträge zur Geschichte der DDR. Bund, Frankfurt am Main 1991, ISBN 3-7663-2266-4.
- Die Wandlung des deutschen Kommunismus. Die Stalinisierung der KPD in der Weimarer Republik. 2 vols. Europäische Verlagsanstalt, Frankfurt am Main 1969, Literature by and about Hermann Weber in the German National Library catalogue.
- Ulbricht fälscht Geschichte. Ein Kommentar mit Dokumenten zum „Grundriß der Geschichte der deutschen Arbeiterbewegung“. Neuer Deutscher Verlag, Köln 1964, Literature by and about Hermann Weber in the German National Library catalogue.

==== As editor ====
- Hermann Weber and others (Ed.): Kommunisten verfolgen Kommunisten: stalinistischer Terror und „Säuberungen“ in den kommunistischen Parteien Europas seit den dreißiger Jahren. Akademie-Verlag, Berlin 1993, ISBN 3-05-002259-0.
- Der Gründungsparteitag der KPD. Europäische Verlagsanstalt, Frankfurt am Main 1969. Neu herausgegeben und eingeleitet: Die Gründung der KPD, Protokoll und Materialien des Gründungsparteitages der KPD 1918/1919. Mit einer Einführung zur angeblichen Erstveröffentlichung durch die SED. Dietz, Berlin 1993, ISBN 3-320-01818-3.

=== Young communist ===
Weber joined the KPD himself in 1945. Early in 1946 he attended a four-week course near Berlin organised by the Free German Youth (FDJ / Freie Deutsche Jugend) which was in effect the newly created youth wing of the German Communist Party, legalized again following the defeat of Nazi Germany in the Second World War. In June of that year he was a delegate to the FDJ's first parliament, where he met its president, Erich Honecker, future head of state of the German Democratic Republic (GDR/East Germany). Weber's hometown of Mannheim was a part of the US occupation zone, but in 1947 he headed to the Soviet occupation zone in the east of what remained of Germany and spent two years as a student at the Karl Marx Party Academy in Berlin, leaving in 1949. A fellow student of Weber's was Herbert Mies, also from the Mannheim area. To his initial irritation, the Socialist Unity Party of Germany ruling over the Soviet occupation zone insisted that Weber study under a pseudonym, settling on "Hermann Wunderlich". Later he would joke that he was disappointed because the authorities had not permitted him to call himself "Walter", and in 2002 he published a volume of memoirs under the ironic title "Damals, als ich Wunderlich hieß" ("Back then, when they called me Wunderlich"). It was as a student at the "Karl Marx" Academy that he met his future wife, Gerda Röder.

=== Back in the Federal Republic ===
In 1949 Weber was sent back to what had now become the Federal Republic of Germany (West Germany), formally established in May 1949 from a combination of the three Allied occupation zones hitherto under US, British and French control. He became editor-in-chief of the FDJ-Zeitung, a newspaper based at this stage in Frankfurt aimed at young West Germans. He was very soon demoted to the position of culture editor on the newspaper by FDJ chief Honecker because he had given insufficient prominence to a telegram received from Stalin – Stalin's message had appeared on the front page, but only in a small box. Despite the demotion, Weber continued the political struggle against the "Revanchist Adenauer state". He was arrested in March 1953 and taken into investigative custody after the FDJ was designated a banned organisation in the west. The year was one of increased east–west tension, with a significant uprising violently crushed in East Germany in June. Two months later, still detained, Hermann Weber spent his 25th birthday in a prison in Essen. He was released later in 1953, but in 1954 he was expelled from the German Communist Party. In 1955 he joined West Germany's "moderate left" SPD (party), though he would always be regarded as part of the party's left wing.

=== Academia ===
Between 1964 and 1968 Weber studied at Marburg and Mannheim, obtaining his doctorate after only four years. Habilitation followed in 1970 and an "extraordinary professorship" in 1973. This represented an exceptionally rapid progression, which reflected both Weber's talents and many years, when a younger man, of relevant learning and experience. At the Karl Marx Party Academy in the late 1940s, Hermann and Gerda Weber had been part of an elite group of students. Guest lecturers had included Wilhelm Pieck, Walter Ulbricht, Otto Grotewohl, Anton Ackermann, Fred Oelßner and Kurt Hager – men who had taken a lead role in creating the German Democratic Republic, which was now Weber's own field of study. His youngest professor at the party academy and, he believed, among the best of them, had been Wolfgang Leonhard who himself had subsequently defected to the west and become, like Weber, a notable academic expert on East Germany. The two remained friends despite robustly held professional differences. Hermann Weber served as Professor for Political Sciences and Contemporary History at the University of Mannheim from 1975 till his formal retirement in 1993. In 1981 he founded the university's Research division on German Democratic Republic (GDR) History, while producing a succession of well regarded publications on aspects the GDR, many of which became much cited standard works.

=== Post retirement career ===
Weber remained a board member of the National Foundation for Re-assessment of the SED Dictatorship. He was also an honorary member of the Joint Commission for research on recent German Russian relations.

In 1993 he founded the Year Book for Historical Communism Research, an annual publication which he continued to edit till 2007.

== Professional high point ==
Weber identified a high point of his research career as the discovery, in 1968, of the text of the original minutes of the Founding Congress of the German Communist Party. The record had been undiscovered for fifty years. Subsequently, East Germany's ruling SED (party) asserted that they had found it, and they showed little urgency in making it available. However, in 1972 the party's Institute for Marxism–Leninism published an edition which was unambiguously based on Weber's version.
