= Erich Garske =

German activist (1907–1943)

Erich Garske (21 November 1907 - 13 December 1943) was a German political activist (KPD) and, after 1933, a resistance activist. He was executed by the Nazis in December 1943.

== Biography ==
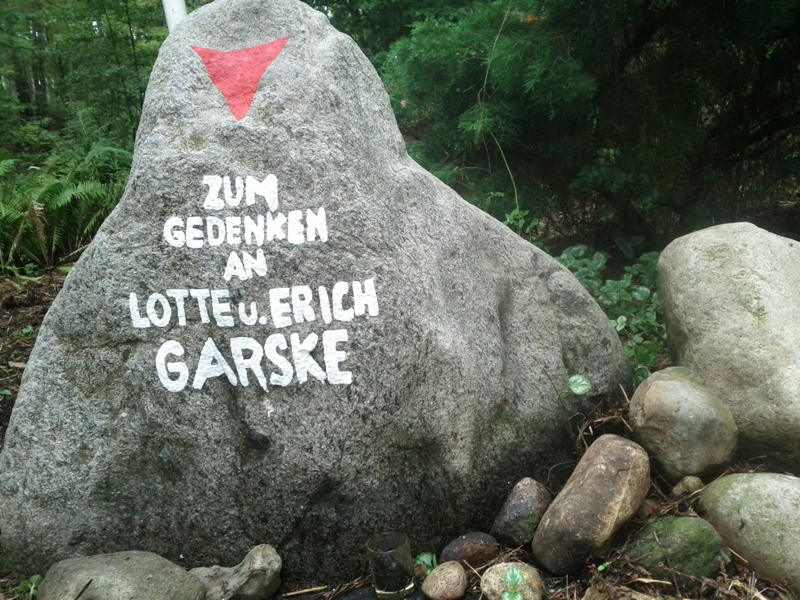
The memorial stone to the Garskes was erected in 1944 by their friends at a lakeside camping place where they often stayed. Predating the collapse of the Nazi régime, it is one of the earliest public memorials in Germany to Nazi victims. It was renovated - washed and repainted - in 2013. The memorial enjoys "protected" status.

Erich Garske was born in 1907. He was a technical draftsman by profession. In January 1933, when the Nazis took power, he was already a member of the Communist Party. The Nazis lost little time in transforming Germany into a one- party dictatorship. Party political activity became illegal, and after the Reichstag Fire in February 1933, the authorities devoted particular energy to outlawing activities undertaken on behalf of the Communist Party. Garske nevertheless remained politically active, producing satirical cartoons for the illegal newspapers produced by peace activists.

1933 was also the year in which Erich Garske married Charlotte Schaepe. By the end of 1933 many German communist activists had been arrested, while others had fled into exile. The Garskes did not emigrate and were not, in the short term, arrested. Indeed, when the Communist Party in exile smuggled people back into Germany from Prague, Moscow or Paris to work on party matters, one of the places where they might be hidden and accommodated was in the Garskes' apartment in central Berlin. As early as 1934 they secretly accommodated Eugen Schwebinghaus, a close party colleague of Robert Stamm. From 1942 their Berlin apartment was the work-place and a communications hub for "Alfred". Erich Garske was able to help Alfred in his work by producing satirical drawings and other art work for illegal party publications, notably with a news journal called "Der Friedenskämpfer" ("The Fighter for Peace"). "Alfred" was the code name used by Wilhelm Knöchel, an exceptionally effective communist resistance organiser.

Erich Garske and Wilhelm Knöchel were arrested at the Garskes' home by the Gestapo on 30 January 1943. Charlotte was arrested on 17 February 1943. On 9 November 1943, the special "People's Court" sentenced Erich and Charlotte Garske to death. Erich was killed - sources use the verb "murdered" - on 13 December 1943, Charlotte Garske on 16 December 1943, both at the punishment prison at Berlin-Plötzensee.
