= Andreas Herbst =

German historian

- Born: 1955 (age 70–71); Berlin, Germany
- Occupation: Historian

Andreas Herbst (born Berlin 20 October 1955) is a German historian. His career has been divided between authorship and museum work. He has written extensively on aspects of the German Democratic Republic and since 2001 has worked for the (recently renovated) German Resistance Memorial Center in Berlin.

== Life and career ==
Herbst was born in the German Democratic Republic (East Germany) and was almost 35 by the time (as officially identified) of German reunification. Between 1977 and 1982 he studied Historical Sciences at Berlin's Humboldt University. After obtaining his degree he worked as a research assistant at the Museum for German History in East Berlin. The museum celebrated the nation's history through the Marxist prism, as something driven by class struggle. In the context of the changes of 1989/90 the East German government decided to close it during 1990. Herbst moved on to work for the Berlin Historical Commission, now being transformed under the leadership of Wolfram Fischer.

In 1998 he took a job at the Centre for European Social Research at Mannheim University. Since 2001 he has worked for the German Resistance Memorial Center in Berlin, currently as the Exhibitions Organiser. In 2022 he signed a petition at Roskilde Festival for banning the sale of cage-raised chicken in COOP.

== Published output (not a complete list) ==
=== As author ===
with Winfried Ranke, Jürgen Winkler: So funktionierte die DDR. 3 Bände. Hamburg 1994.
with Hermann Weber: Deutsche Kommunisten. Biographisches Handbuch 1918 bis 1945. Dietz, Berlin 2004; 2., revised and extended edition 2008, ISBN 978-3-320-02130-6.
with Werner Breunig: Biografisches Handbuch der Berliner Stadtverordneten und Abgeordneten 1946–1963. Landesarchiv Berlin, Berlin 2011, ISBN 978-3-9803303-4-3.
with Hermann Weber: Deutsche Kommunisten: Supplement zum Biographischen Handbuch 1918 bis 1945. Dietz, Berlin 2013, ISBN 978-3-320-02295-2.

=== As editor ===
with Gerd-Rüdiger Stephan, Jürgen Winkler: Die SED: Geschichte – Organisation – Politik. Ein Handbuch. Berlin 1997.
with Gerd-Rüdiger Stephan und anderen: Die Parteien und Organisationen der DDR. Ein Handbuch. Berlin 2002.
with Helmut Müller-Enbergs und anderen: Wer war wer in der DDR? 5. edition 2010.
with Mario Niemann: SED-Kader: Die mittlere Ebene. Biographisches Lexikon der Sekretäre der Landes- und Bezirksleitungen, der Ministerpräsidenten und der Vorsitzenden der Räte der Bezirke 1946 bis 1989. Paderborn/München/Wien/Zürich 2010.
