= Waalsdorpervlakte =

Nature area in the Netherlands

Coordinates: 52°6′56.2″N 4°20′12.36″E

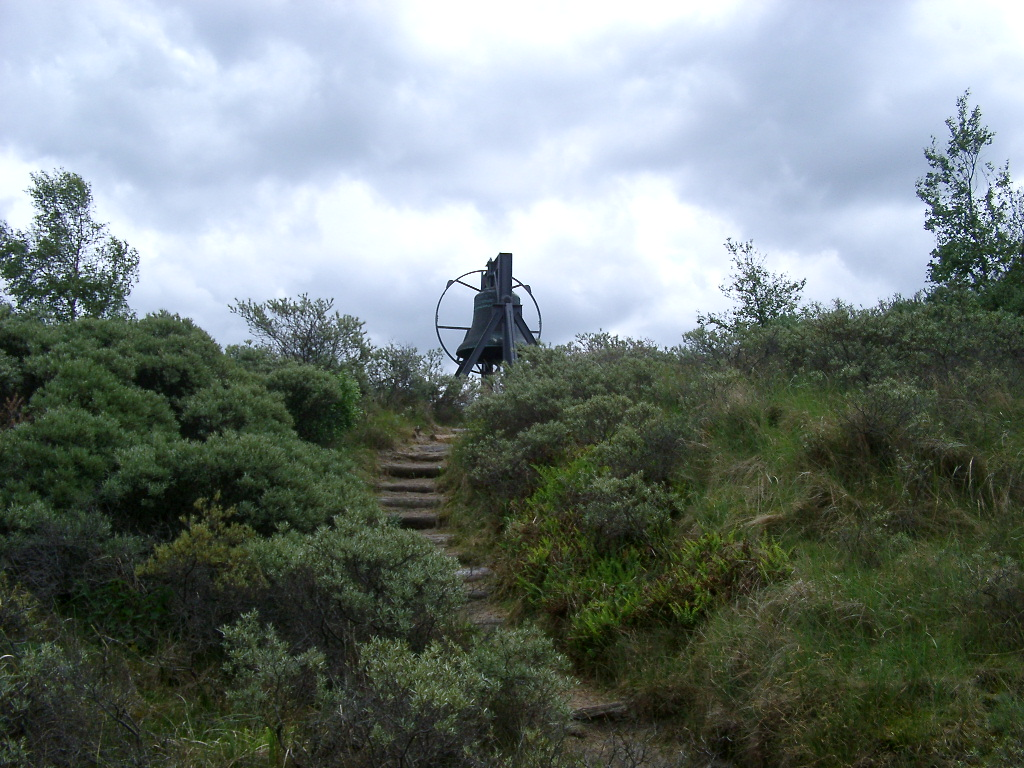
Bell on the Waalsdorpervlakte (used during the commemoration events)

The Waalsdorpervlakte (Dutch pronunciation: [ˌʋaːlzdɔrpərˈvlɑktə]) is a clearing in the dune area "Meijendel" (The Hague, Netherlands), where between 250 and 280 members of the Dutch resistance were killed by the Germans during World War II. After the liberation of the Netherlands, Nazi collaborators were executed at the site. Anton Mussert, the leader of National Socialist Movement in the Netherlands, was executed here on 7 May 1946.

It is one of the main locations where on 4 May "Remembrance of the Dead", a yearly commemoration of victims of World War II and other victims of war, is held.
