= De Waarheid =

Party newspaper of the Communist Party of the Netherlands and anti-fascist polemical

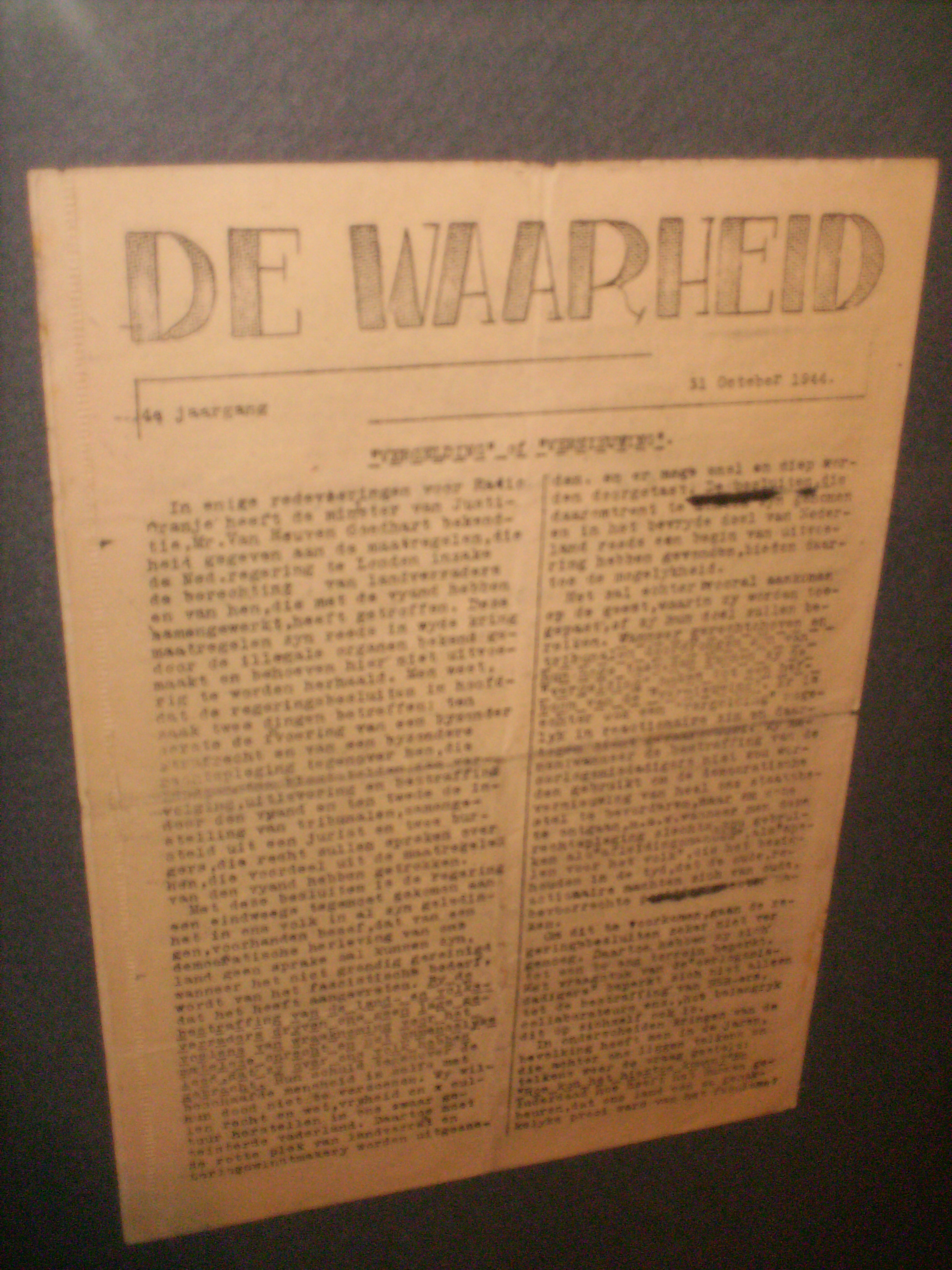
Cover of De Waarheid, edition of 31 October 1944

De Waarheid (literally 'The Truth') was the newspaper of the Communist Party of the Netherlands. Their name is also on the logo.

== History ==
It originated in 1940 under the German occupation as a resistance paper, the day after general H.G. Winkelman had forbidden publication of the earlier Communist Volksdagblad. The party decided on May 15, 1940, to continue the Volksdagblad illegally under the name De Waarheid. The first months were spent setting up a nationwide network of 'handout points' ('stencilposten'), the main articles would be written centrally, whereas the different 'handout points' added localized articles. These local versions sometimes were published under different names as 'De vonk' ('The spark') and 'Het noorderlicht' ('The northern light').

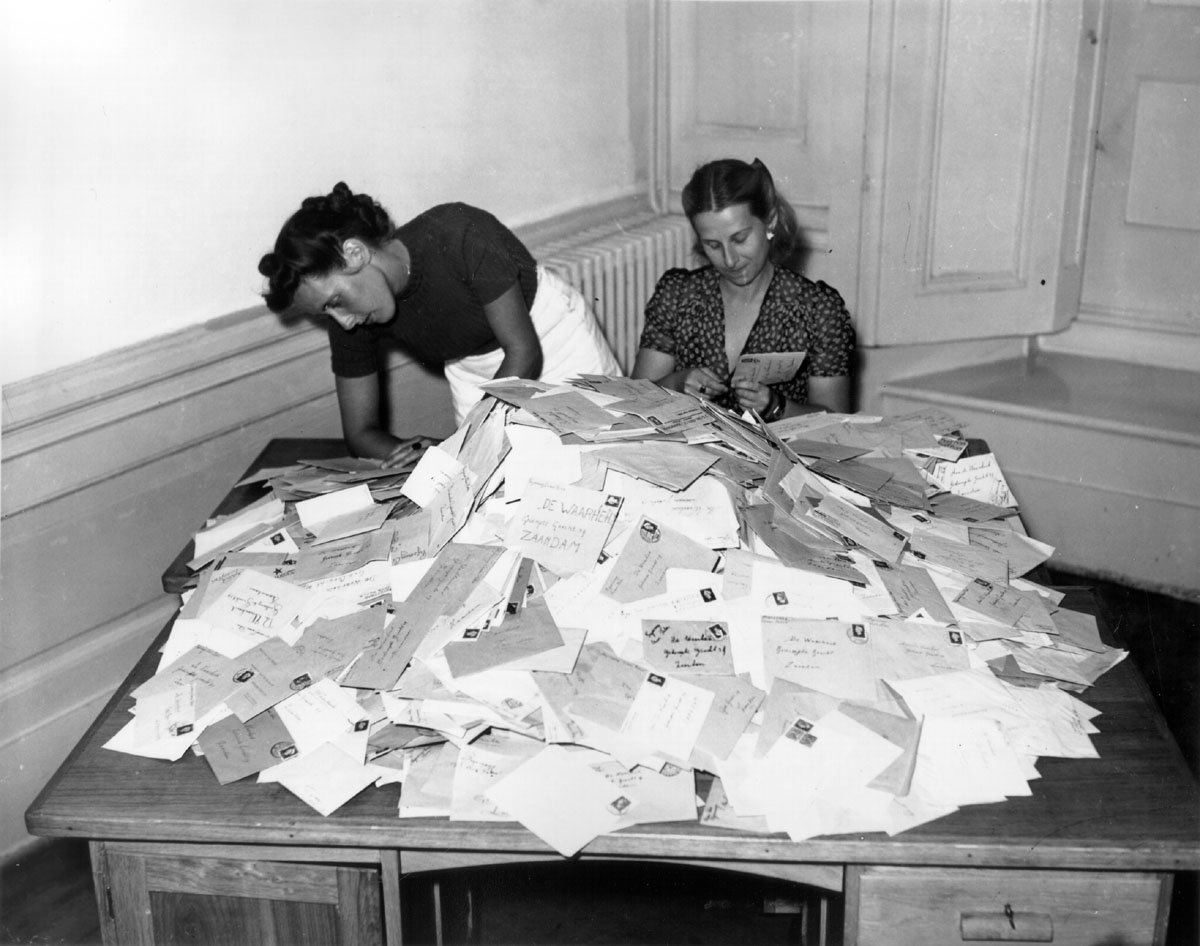
Post n.a.v. een prijsvraag van De Waarheid (krant), Gedempte Gracht, Zaandam, 28 augustus 1947

In the last decades it became a more independent left wing newspaper but circulation continued to drop and the paper was discontinued on 28 April 1990.

== Circulation figures ==
- 1945 (September): 341.550
- 1947: 150.000
- 1948: 135.000
- 1950: 113.000
- 1955: 50.000
- 1960: 29.000
- 1966: 22.000
- 1968: 21.200
- 1970: 20.000
- 1975: 22.000
- 1980: 26.000
- 1985: 12.000
- 1988: 9.000
- 1990: 6.000

== Editors ==
Anthoon Johan Koejemans	1945–1948
Fred Schoonenberg; Paul de Groot	1948–1949
Fred Schoonenberg; Friedl Baruch	1949–1953
Marcus Bakker	1953–1958
Joop Wolff	1958–1978
Gijs Schreuders	1978–1982
Bart Schmidt	1982–1983
Constant Vecht	1983–1986
Paul Wouters	1986–1988
Frank Biesboer	1988–1990
