= Willi Seng =

Willi Seng (11 February 1909 – 27 July 1944) was a German communist activist who became a resistance fighter during the Nazi period. He was captured in 1943 and faced trial in 1944, following which he was convicted and two months later executed.

== Biography ==
Willi Seng was born in Berlin. He became a member of a workers' sports club called "Fichte" in 1920 and in 1929 travelled to Moscow in order to take part in the Soviet sponsored Spartakiad sports festival. In 1930 he became a member of Rote Hilfe ("Red Aid"), a workers' welfare organisation widely (and correctly) believed to have close connections with the Communist Party and with Moscow. In 1932 he joined the Communist Party itself. In January 1933 a new government took power and lost no time in transforming Germany into a one-party dictatorship. The authorities were diligent in their persecution of political opponents, and in particular of communists, many of whom fled abroad. Others were arrested. Willi Senf was arrested the early part of 1933 and detained at the newly established Oranienburg concentration camp. On his release from "protective custody" he worked as a link-man for the Communist-backed Kampfgemeinschaft für Rote Sporteinheit (KG – loosely "Association for fighting for red sporting unity"), liaising with the Berlin city authorities.

From 1934 he was in charge of the regional KG for "Neiderrhein", headquartered in Düsseldorf, where he was also the producer of two newspapers: "Westdeutscher Arbeitersport" ("West German Workers' Sport") and "Sportfreund" ("Friend of Sport"). The political nature of the KG nevertheless made his involvement with it illegal, and his sports journalism also gave him a significant public profile. In May 1935, responding to a wave of political arrests, he fled to Amsterdam. In August of that same year he moved on to Moscow where until the first part of 1937 he studied at the Communist International's "Lenin Academy".

In 1938 the party leadership ordered Seng back to the west, initially to Paris which, along with Moscow, had become an informal headquarters for the German Communist Party in exile. From there he returned to Amsterdam from where, till October 1938, he worked as an instructor on behalf of the party's "foreign leadership" for the economically important Ruhr region of Germany. This involved frequent visits across the border into Germany in order to conduct secret meetings with on-the-spot contacts in major cities such as Dortmund, Essen and Oberhausen.

At the end of January 1939 he was a participant at the party's "Bern Conference" which was named after the Swiss capital for security reasons. (It actually took place in the Paris suburb of Draveil.) After the German invasion of the Netherlands which took place in May 1940 he continued to be based, using false names, in the Netherlands. At the end of 1940 Seng was instructed, probably on the initiative of Wilhelm Knöchel (who operated under the code name "Alfred"), to relocate to Düsseldorf and await further instructions. The instructions, which came quickly, involved working to set up an underground anti-government network in the Ruhr region.

Seng had good business connections in places such as Essen, Duisburg, Bottrop, Wuppertal and in the Bergisches Land (hill country to the east of the industrial belt) on whom he could call for relevant specialist skills. Using cover names such as "August" and "Kurt", and working alongside Alfons Kaps, Wilhelm Knöchel and Alfred Kowalke, he produced illegal literature under titles such as "Ruhr-Echo", "Illegaler SA-Mann" and "Friedenskämpfer" ("Fighters for Peace").

According to testimony provided by Alfons Kaps, the Gestapo succeeded in locating and arresting Willi Seng on 20 January 1943. Elsewhere there are suggestions that Kaps himself had been "persuaded" to set up a meeting with Seng which amounted to leading the Gestapo to "August", the name by which Seng was known to his comrade. In response to "intensified interrogation" techniques Seng not merely provided his interrogators with the information that they sought, but also agreed to arrange a secret meeting in Berlin with Wilhelm Knöchel which would serve the purpose of leading the Gestapo to Knöchel. That plan misfired, however, since on the day in question Knöchel was seriously ill in bed, so never turned up for the meeting.

On 24 May 1944 the special "People's Court" sentenced Will Seng to death. The sentence was carried out in Cologne on 27 July 1944.
