= Wilhelm Knöchel =

German communist and antifascist (1899–1944)

- Born: 8 November 1899; Offenbach am Main, Germany
- Died: 24 July 1944 (aged 44); Brandenburg-Görden Prison
- Cause of death: Execution
- Occupation: Activist
- Political party: Social Democratic Party of Germany
- Children: 3

Wilhelm Knöchel (German pronunciation: [ˈvɪlhɛlm ˈknœçl̩]; 8 November 1899 – 24 July 1944) was a German Communist Party activist and organizer who after 1933, became an anti-government resistance activist. His trial lasted ten minutes. He was executed/murdered at the Brandenburg-Görden penitentiary, a short distance outside Berlin, to the west of the city.

== Life ==
=== Early life and provenance ===
Wilhelm Knöchel was born into a Social Democratic working-class family on 8 November 1899 in Offenbach am Main, a short distance upriver from Frankfurt. He qualified and worked as a factory machine operator. In 1917, he was conscripted into the Imperial Army, shortly after which he was badly wounded. He also worked as a mines maintenance engineer. In 1919, with the Weimar Republic affected by acute economic hardship and, especially in the cities, a succession of revolutionary uprisings, Knöchel joined the Social Democratic Party of Germany. By 1920, he had relocated in search of work to the industrially vital and internationally critical Ruhr region. In 1920 or 1923, he switched to the recently created Communist Party of Germany. Between 1924 and 1930, he was a member of the party leadership team for the Dortmund region. In 1930, following the death of his first wife, he returned to Offenbach de Main, where it was arranged that his daughter should be brought up by relatives. Knöchel was employed as a party official.

=== National Socialist years ===
In late 1931 or early 1932, Wilhelm Knöchel relocated via Czechoslovakia to the Soviet Union, where he worked as a miner. Between 1932 and 1934, he studied at the International Lenin School, run by the Comintern in Moscow. While he was away, in January 1933, the Nazi Party took power and transformed Germany into a one-party dictatorship. This meant that by the time he returned to Germany membership of the Communist Party had become illegal. Knöchel remained an active member, working from 1934 as a senior advisor for the underground party team in Hamburg, in which, before the ban, the Communist Party had been particularly strong.

Knöchel attended the Brussels Conference in Moscow in October 1935. (It had been misleadingly identified in party communications as the "Brussels Conference" during the planning process in order to confuse the German security Services.) He was elected a candidate for Central Committee membership. By this time. most of the active members of the German Communist Party had either been arrested or had fled into exile, and in 1936, he was sent to Amsterdam where he teamed up with Wilhelm Beuttel to set up a "western leadership team" for the exiled party: most of the political activity in question was nevertheless undertaken, under conditions of extreme and growing danger, by comrades operating "underground" in the Rhineland, and most particularly in the Ruhr region where the focus was on communist resistance, organised through the (illegal) trades union movement in the economically important coal mines. He was a co-founder and secretary of the "Communist Committee for German Free Trades Union Miners". In 1938, he was elected to membership of the executive of "The Miners' International".

=== War years ===
In January 1939, he attended the Bern Conference, which was held in Draveil, just outside Paris. He was elected to full Central Committee membership and was given responsibility not just for activities in the Netherlands, but also in Belgium and Switzerland. However, wartime conditions mean that communications channels between Amsterdam, where Knöchel had been living since 1936, and the remaining network of party activists across the border in Germany, were degraded or broken.

On 8 January 1942, Wilhelm Knöchel re-entered Germany and, disguised as an itinerant specialist silver polisher, travelled illegally via Düsseldorf to the Ruhr region. There, he was unable to find a safe location in which to set himself up. He then moved on to Berlin, where he was supported by Alfred Kowalke. During 1942, he undertook several trips to Düsseldorf, Essen and Wuppertal which enabled him to engage directly in political discussions with workers in a number of different factories. Three of his contacts from his time in Amsterdam were still active in the Ruhr region. From his base in Berlin, where he teamed up with Willi Seng to establish what became identified in some sources as the "Knöchel-Seng [resistance] group", he was also able to retain far-reaching contacts with exiled party leaders in Stockholm, Amsterdam and, on a much more restricted basis, by radio, with fellow members of the party Central Committee in Moscow. Relations with the leadership team in Moscow were tense, but Knöchel moved from being critical of the directives received from the Moscow-based team. As he wrote at one stage to his partner Cilly Hansmann (1908 – 1984), who undertook courier work for him, "Are those guys in Moscow sitting on the moon?". (Note: "Sitzen die in Moskau auf dem Mond?")

Wilhelm Knöchel and a relatively small number of his associates were the only ones who successfully made the attempt to establish a communist resistance group in Germany during this period. During January, several members of the group were captured, starting on 12 January 1943 with Alfons Kaps. Kaps was interrogated and severely tortured and, it is inferred, provided information that led his interrogators to other resistance group members. On 30 January 1943, Wilhelm Knöchel was also arrested, in the Berlin apartment of comrades Charlotte and Erich Garske. The arrest of this exceptionally productive anti-Nazi activist represented a major triumph for the security services. An attempt to lure him to a meeting, set up by his senior comrade Willi Seng a few days earlier, had failed because he was sick in bed. It turned out that several comrades, including Seng, had been arrested on 20 January and subjected to torture in order to persuade him to set up that meeting. When the meeting had failed to take place Seng had also been persuaded to disclose Knöchel's Berlin hiding place.

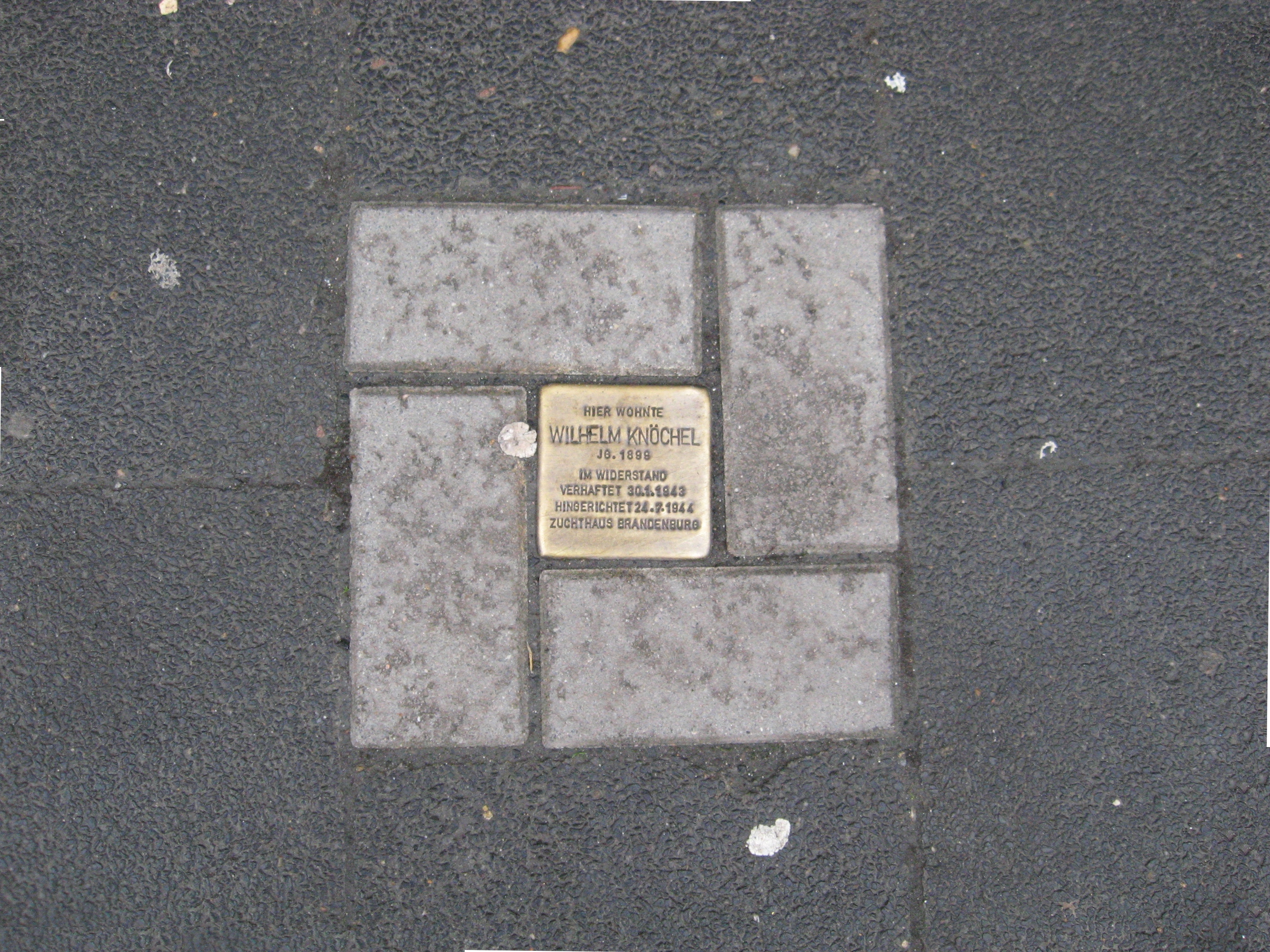
Knöchel's grave

Following his arrest, it is likely that Wilhelm Knöchel was subjected to the same levels of extreme torture as Seng (and others arrested at the same time). On 17 February 1943, he offered his Gestapo interrogators a deal that would involve his working for them as a V-Mann. Following interrogation, he was taken to the concentration camp at Scheveningen on the Dutch coast. During the summer of 1944, he was taken back to Berlin where, on 12 June 1944, he faced the special "People's Court". Knöchel's "trial" was conducted by the court president, Roland Freisler, himself. The hearing lasted just ten minutes, and ended with Knöchel being sentenced to death, found guilty under the all too familiar charge, in those times, of "Preparing to commit high treason". Other members of the group, including Willi Seng, Alfons Kaps, Alfred Kowalke, and Wilhelm Beuttel were sentenced to death at the same time. Wilhelm Knöchel was executed/murdered at the Brandenburg-Görden penitentiary on 24 July 1944.

== Personal life ==
During his time in the Ruhr region, in 1922, Wilhelm Knöchel married a war widow who came to the marriage with two children. The couple's third child, Inge, was born in 1921. His wife died young in 1930, however.
