= Kuijer =

Kuijer is a surname. Notable people with the surname include:

- Guus Kuijer (born 1942), Dutch author
- Ruud Kuijer (born 1959), Dutch sculptor

== See also ==
- Kuiper
