= Oxenaar =

Oxenaar is a surname. Notable people with the surname include:

- Ootje Oxenaar (1929–2017), Dutch graphic artist, visual artist, commissioner, and professor
- Suzanne Oxenaar (fl. 1991) is a Dutch cultural entrepreneur, designer
