= Harm Haken =

Dutch politician (1919-1972)

Member of the Senate
- In office 21 January 1958 – 6 June 1962

Member of the Provincial Council of Groningen
- In office 5 July 1950 – 6 June 1962

Personal details
- Born: 25 February 1919 Finsterwolde, Netherlands
- Died: 15 April 1972 (aged 53) Sande, West Germany
- Party: CPN
- Spouse(s): Tjaaktje Bruins (m. 1951; died 1957) Ursula Anna Bartsch (m. 1964)
- Children: 1

Harm Haken (25 February 1919 – 15 April 1972) was a Dutch politician. During the late 1940s to early 1960s, Haken was a key figure in the Communist Party of the Netherlands (CPN) in Finsterwolde, serving as alderman from 1947 to 1951 and from 1953 to 1962. He was also a member of the provincial council of Groningen from 1950 to 1962 and of the Dutch Senate from 1958 to 1963.

== Biography ==
Harm Haken was born on 25 February 1919 in Finsterwolde, the son of farm labourer and later tenant farmer Siemen Haken and Jantje Hoogakker. Haken initially worked as a farm labourer, joining the Communist Party of the Netherlands (CPN) before the Second World War. In 1946 he was elected councillor and alderman of Finsterwolde. In 1950 he also became a member of the provincial council of Groningen for the CPN. He soon became the key figurehead of his party in Finsterwolde.

As a councilor, he was primarily known for his controversial remarks, such as that the local population would welcome the Red Army with open arms in the event of an invasion as well as for the day of reckoning that could then be expected. During a protest meeting, he called the mayors of Beerta, Finsterwolde, and Nieuweschans 'pigs' and 'jackals', which resulted in a fine of 75 guilders. In council meetings, he used his immunity to, for instance, label Prime Minister Drees a warmonger, and compared the police actions in Indonesia to the actions of Adolf Hitler. In the council, he consistently attempted to undermine the mayor's position. The mayor, in turn, characterized Haken as "the terrorist of the municipality," because he allegedly exercised a reign of terror over the civil servants.

In July 1951, in an atmosphere of Cold War tension, the municipal council and the municipal executive were dissolved by the Minister of the Interior due to mismanagement. This was done on the basis of a special law, against which only the CPN parliamentary group, with his brother as spokesperson, objected. PvdA mayor Tuin, who had long been at odds with Haken and his party colleagues, was appointed government commissioner. The stated reason was the provision of benefits to striking relief workers in 1949 and the violation of other government regulations. The communists, in turn, claimed that there was a conspiracy by wealthy landowners and the United States to silence the workers.

In 1953, during new elections, Haken was re-elected to the council and became an alderman once again. The local CPN branch was fully under the control of Haken, together with his confidant Jan Siemons. Supporters who came into conflict with him, such as alderman Pieter Molenkamp, were forced to give up their party membership.

Haken was one of the confidants of CPN party leader Paul de Groot. In 1947, he was a member of the executive board of the General Dutch Youth League. From 1953 to 1960, he was a member of the CPN party executive. He also served on the Groningen district board, where he acted as an 'agent,' or party instructor, for the northern provinces. In 1957, he succeeded his comrade Usco van der Schans as secretary of the CPN branch in Groningen, giving Haken de facto leadership within the Groningen party district. He actively helped ensure that Van der Schans became salaried chairman of the Union of Agricultural and Dairy Workers, leading to split within the CPN-aligned Eenheids Vakcentrale. Former party colleague Jan de Jong remembers Haken as a shady and verbally aggressive personality, who operated with his friends as a "sort of mafia gang." Haken was involved in violent incidents twice, including those directed against supporters of the Brug group during the 1959 elections. When he was arrested for driving under the influence in October 1962, he threatened a police officer, and was fined 75 guilders.

In October 1956, following the death of his brother Jan, Haken stood as a candidate for the Senate, but he was not elected. In 1958 he eventually entered the Senate, replacing fellow party member Cor Geugjes, who had broken with the CPN. In the 1960 elections, he was re-elected to the Senate, where he focused primarily on economic affairs, agriculture, defense, and social affairs.

Haken's business activities led to criticism behind closed doors; he was said to have developed "capitalist airs" by establishing a contracting company in June 1959. The Binnenlandse Veiligheidsdient believed that the conduct" of prominent communists like Haken had led to division in Finsterwolde, leading to the party deciding to "gradually sideline" him. In May 1961, he did not return as a party executive for health reasons and due to a busy work schedule. The following year, his membership of the Provincial Council came to an end; he also resigned as an alderman.

In mid-March 1963, Haken, who was still a member of the Senate at the time, was arrested on suspicion of forgery. Five other party members, including two aldermen, were also detained. Those involved had collaborated in drawing up a false deed intended to secure the insurance money for the reconstruction of the CPN community center and cinema 'Het Centrum' in Finsterwolde, which had burned down in 1960. The communist newspaper De Waarheid spoke of a "transparently anti-communist riot," so close to the parliamentary elections of May 1963. Haken spent five weeks in pre-trial detention. The court in Groningen sentenced him to four months in prison; the Leeuwarden Court of Appeal reduced this on appeal to eight weeks, half of which was suspended. His contracting company was also suspected of tax fraud and evading social security contributions; one of his employees, the former head of the municipal social services, was convicted for tax fraud in 1964.

Around that time, Haken settled with his fiancée in Weener in Germany, where he worked as a foreman and contractor in the construction industry. His father and his future wife helped recruit personnel for employment in Germany. He did not return to the Senate after the elections in June 1963. In October 1964 he retired from politics and resigned as a member of the municipal council of Finsterwolde.

Harm Haken died on 15 April 1972 in Sande.

== Personal life ==
In 1951 he married Tjaaktje Bruins from Beerta, who died in 1957. The couple had one son. In 1964 he remarried Ursula Anna Bartsch. His younger brother was CPN member of the House of Representatives Jan Haken.
