= Galery Waalkens =

Art gallery in the Netherlands

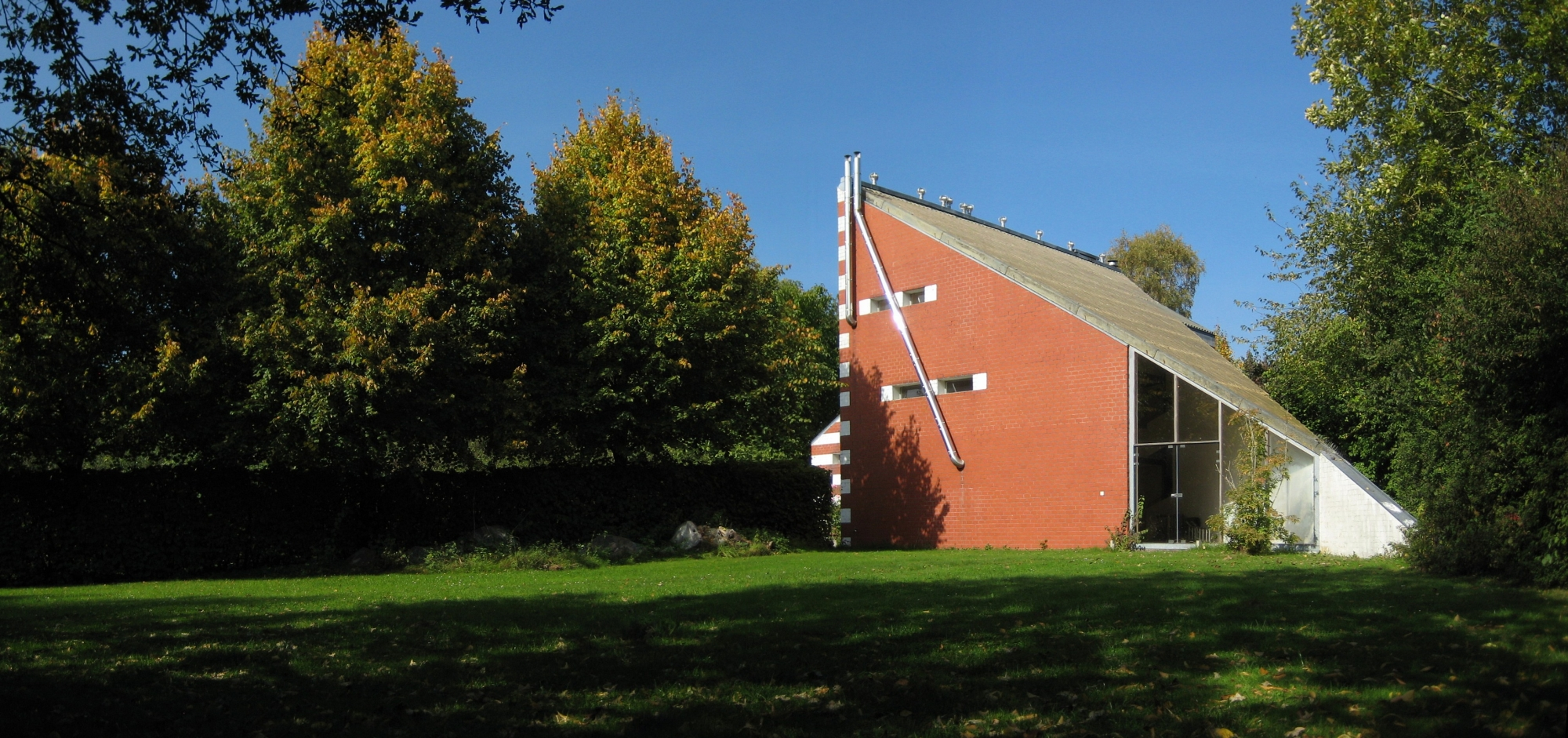
- Galery Waalkens in Finsterwolde designed by Gunnar Daan (2008).
- Origins: Founded in 1962
- Key people: Albert Waalkens (founders)

Galery Waalkens is a Dutch art gallery for the international avant-garde in Finsterwolde founded by Albert Waalkens in 1962.

== History ==
The art gallery had started by Albert Waalkens in the stable of his farm in 1962, where artists and their families mainly from the Randstad could also shelter. The gallery offered a podium for young experimental artists. The gallery came into prominence with some sculpture exhibitions along the public road. It started in ten statues in 1963 around the village of Finsterwolde, and evolved the 1967 exhibition along the public road with 200 sculptures by 63 artists. This exhibition stretched from the city of Groningen to the east of the province.

In 1984 Gunnar Daan come into prominence with an exhibition at the gallery. In 2008 he made the design for the new building of the gallery.

In 1988 the art curator Poul ter Hofstede in cooperation with the Groninger Museum published a retrospective on the gallery with a chronological listing of the exhibitions. In the year 2000 Waalkens was awarded the Benno Premsela Prize by the Netherlands Foundation for Visual Arts for his stimulating attitude towards artists.

In the new millennium the son and former PvdA member of parliament Harm Evert Waalkens continued the gallery, and by 2014 his daughter Merel and her husband continued the tradition. In 2017 the Stichting Beeldlijn completed a new documentary about the gallery and visual art in Groningen, entitled Boer tussen kunst en koren.

=== Exhibitions, a selection ===
- 1963. Beelden in Finsterwolde, open air exhibition.
- 1978. Movement in Dark by Nan Hoover
- 1984. Works of Gunnar Daan.
- 1987. Works by Ruud Kuijer
- 1994. It's in the Air by Felix Hess.

=== Photo Gallery ===
Some examples of the type of works of the artists, that had presented their works at the Galery Waalkens.

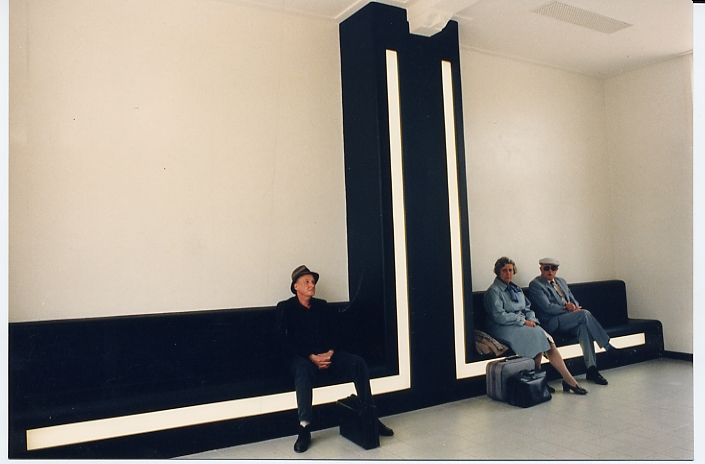
The Ls by Nan Hoover, realized in 1990 in Hardenberg Railway Station

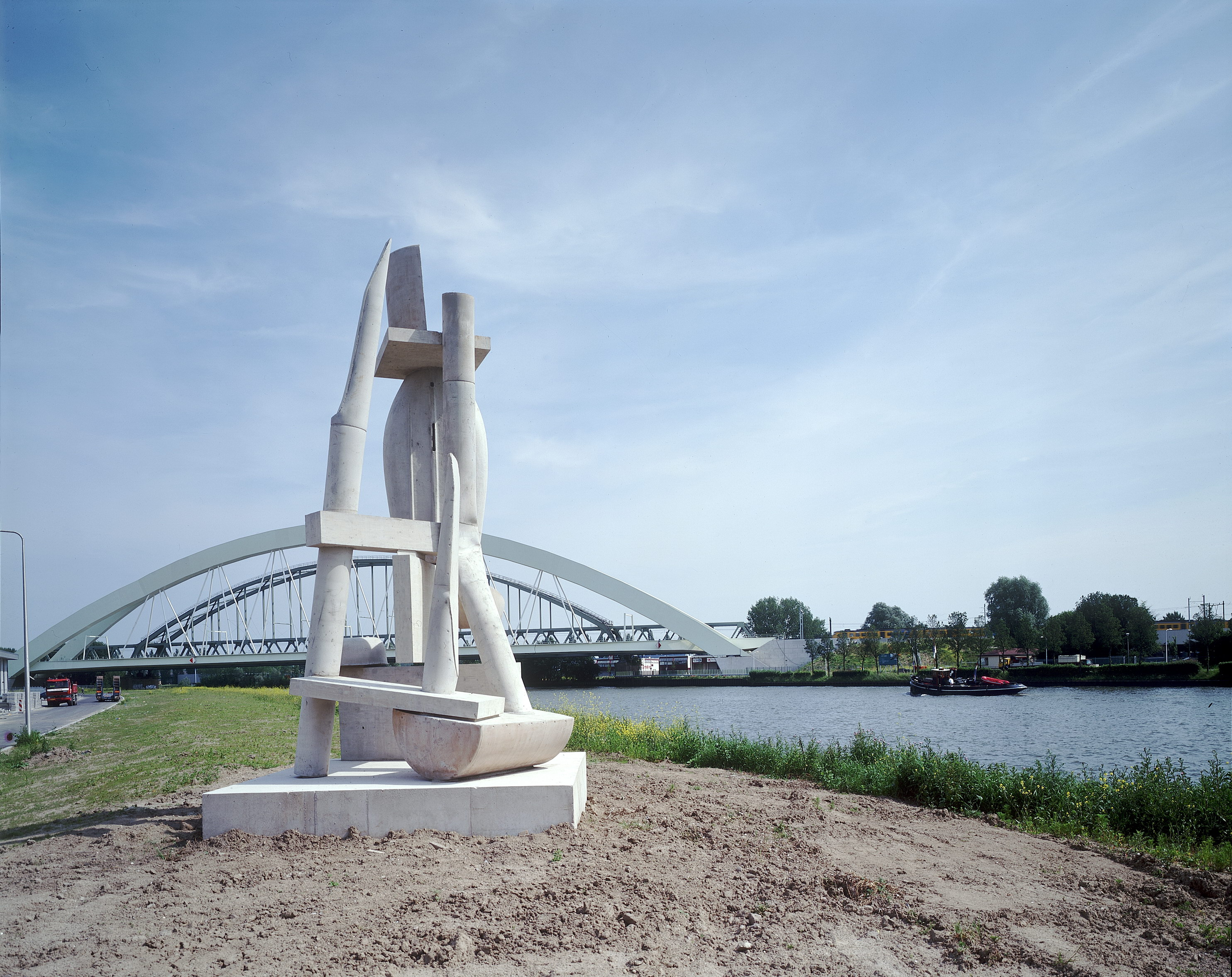
Water Work II Bearable Lightness by Ruud Kuijer realization in 2003

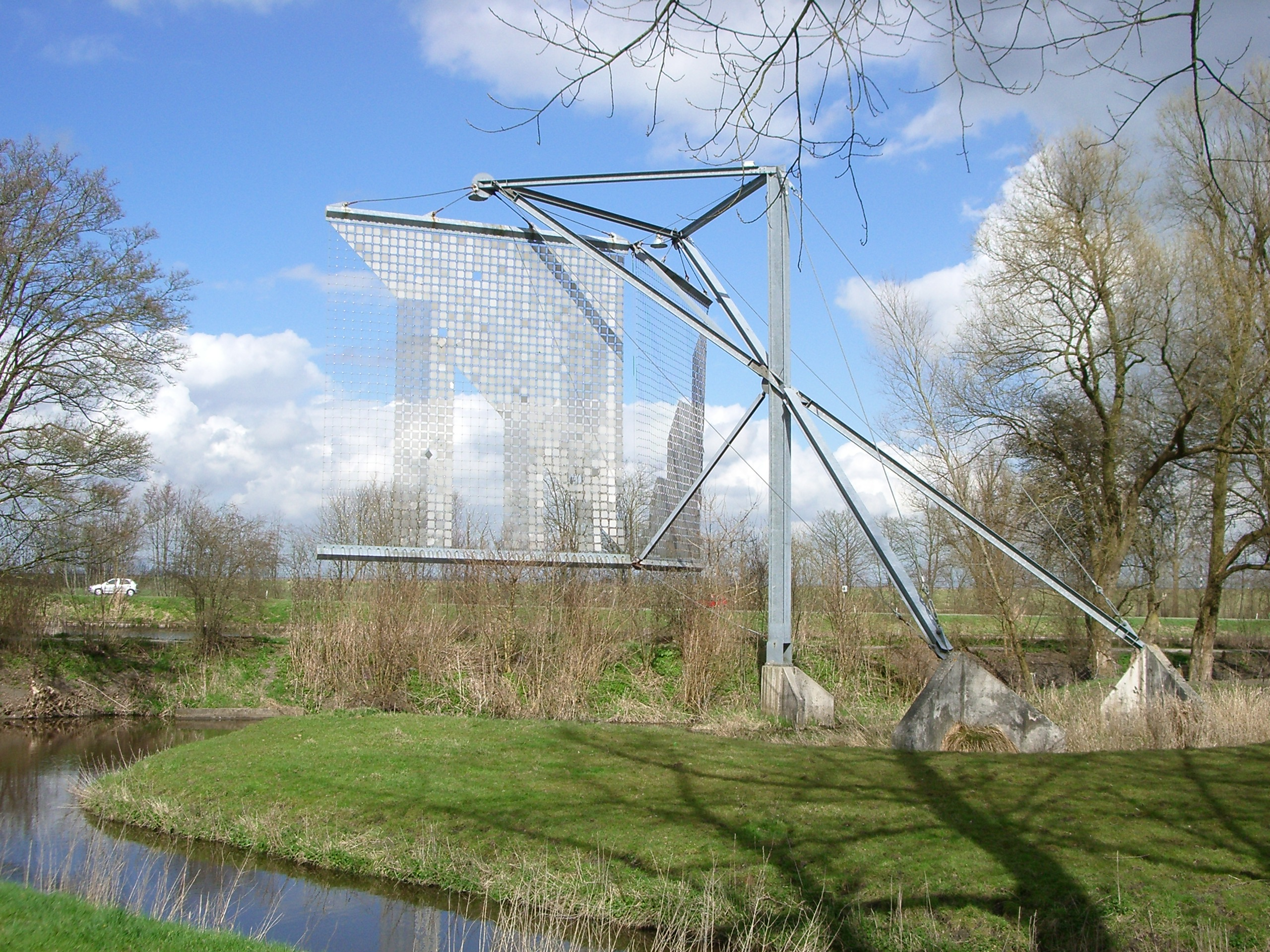
City marking by Gunnar Daan, realization in 2006

== Publications ==
- Poul ter Hofstede, Conformeren aan de Avant-Garde, 25 jaar Galerie Waalkens. Groningen: Groninger Museum, 1988.
- Susan Rijke & Lidy Visser, Archief Galerie Waalkens, Nederlands Instituut voor Kunstgeschiedenis 2014.
