= Jan Haken =

Dutch politician (1912-1956)

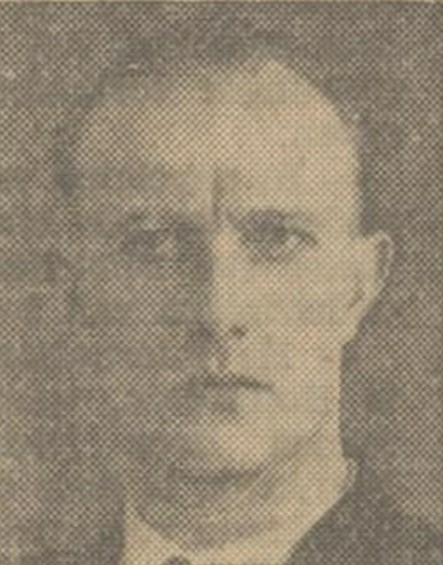
- Jan Haken in 1946

Member of the House of Representatives
- In office 4 June 1946 – 20 November 1956

Personal details
- Born: 13 October 1912 Finsterwolde, Netherlands
- Died: 20 November 1956 (aged 44) Amsterdam, Netherlands
- Party: CPN (1937-1956)
- Spouse: Annechien Woldendorp (m. 1935)
- Children: 4

Jan Haken (13 October 1912 – 20 November 1956) was a Dutch politician and resistance fighter. He was a member of the Dutch House of Representatives from 1946 until his death in 1956 for the Communist Party of the Netherlands (CPN).

== Biography ==
Jan Haken was born on 13 October 1912 in Finsterwolde to Siemen Haken, a farm worker, and Jantje Hoogakker. After completing primary school, he began working as a farm worker, joining the Dutch Confederation of Trade Unions (NVV) at the age of 16. In 1937, Haken joined the Communist Party of the Netherlands (CPN), and was then expelled from the NVV the year after due to perceived radicalism. In 1939, Haken became part of the leadership of the CPN's East Groningen district, and was elected to the Finsterwolde municipal council, where he would serve until being deposed during the German occupation of the Netherlands.

Despite having been sentenced to 14 days prison in 1939 for spreading propaganda, Haken joined the Dutch army during the general mobilisation and was taken prisoner during the German invasion of the Netherlands. He was freed in October 1940, after which he returned to Finsterwolde where he joined the Dutch resistance, helping spread an illegal communist newspaper. On 1 April 1941, Haken was arrested, and imprisoned first in Amersfoort and later in Buchenwald concentration camp until the end of World War II, where he maintained connections between Dutch communists and those of other nationalities.

Haken returned to Finsterwolde on 14 May 1945. That same year, he rejoined the Finsterwolde municipal council and became an alderman, serving until 1946. In 1946, Haken was elected as member of the executive of the CPN. Following the 1946 Dutch general election, Haken became a member of the House of Representatives. As an MP, he was the CPN's spokesperson on economic affairs, agriculture, infrastructure, housing, social work, and telecommunications. He was also involved in organising strikes in Drenthe and southeast Friesland. In the 1956 Dutch general election, Haken was reelected, but he became severely ill, coughing up blood while speaking. Jan Haken died on 20 November 1956 in Amsterdam. During a remembrance ceremony in the House of Representatives, speaker Rad Kortenhorst remembered Haken as a personally friendly person and a hero due to his activities in World War II, despite their ideological differences.

== Personal life ==
Jan Haken married Annechien Woldendorp on 17 May 1935, they had 4 children together. His brother Harm Haken was a member of the CPN's leadership in the 1950s and a member of the Senate from 1958 to 1963.
