= Lloyd Hotel =

Hotel in Amsterdam, the Netherlands

The Hoxton, Lloyd Amsterdam Hotel
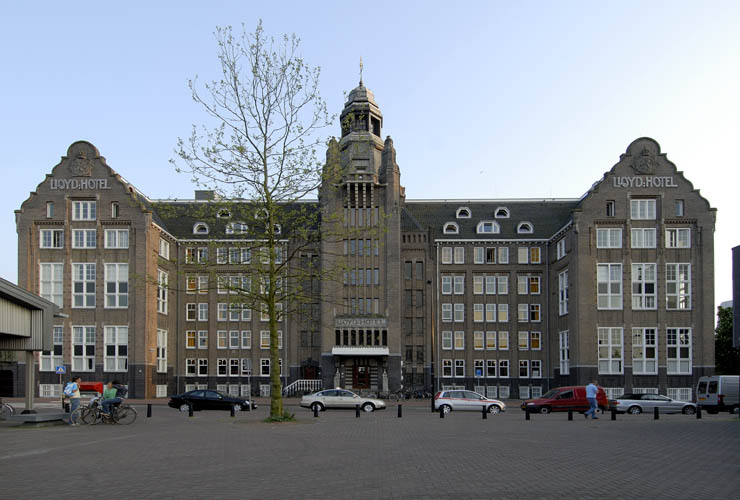

- Location within Amsterdam

General information
- Location: Oostelijke Handelskade 34, Amsterdam, Netherlands
- Coordinates: 52°22′27″N 4°56′5″E
- Opening: 2004

Design and construction
- Developer: MVRDV

Other information
- Number of rooms: 136
- Number of restaurants: 1

The Hoxton, Lloyd Amsterdam is a hotel housed in a historic building in the Eastern Docklands of Amsterdam, commissioned by the Royal Holland Lloyd (Koninklijke Hollandsche Lloyd). Founded as a hotel, it initially housed travelling immigrants. Later, it was used as a detention center and also housed artists' studios. It is an official national monument of the Netherlands. It operated as the Lloyd Hotel from 2004 until 2022 and was re-opened after extensive refurbishment as The Hoxton, Lloyd Amsterdam in September 2023.

== History ==
The building was established in 1918 in the eclectic style, designed by architect Evert Breman, commissioned by the Royal Holland Lloyd (KHL). The KHL did use the hotel as advertising, to recruit clients for passengers heading to South America. When it was completed on June 1, 1921, it had cost eight times more than originally estimated, contributing to the subsequent bankruptcy of the KHL.

From 1921 to 1936 the building was used as temporary accommodation for immigrants, mostly poor Eastern European Jews. In 1936, the KHL went bankrupt and the building was purchased by the City of Amsterdam. Subsequently, from 1938 it was used as a shelter for Jewish refugees from Germany and during World War II, the building was used as detention centre. After the war it continued to function as an adult prison, and later became a juvenile detention centre in 1963.

By 1989 the detention center building had fallen into neglect. It was then served as studio space for artists from the former Yugoslavia. In 1996, a competition was held to decide what the building would best be used for. The curator Suzanne Oxenaar and art historian Otto Nan presented a design for a hotel and "cultural embassy" of culture in Amsterdam. Their plan was developed in sketches by the architect firm MVRDV and after an extensive restoration, the building has served as a hotel since 2004, placed on the monument list in 2001. The hotel has 117 rooms.

After operating as the Lloyd Hotel, it closed in November 2021 for a renovation. In October 2022, it was announced that the international hotel chain The Hoxton, which already had a location on the Herengracht, had acquired the hotel. It reopened in September 2023 under the name The Hoxton, Lloyd Amsterdam. The hotel features 136 rooms, an all-day restaurant called Breman Brasserie, a cocktail bar Barbue, and a hybrid meeting and event space, The Apartment.

== Design ==
Over 40 Dutch and international designers worked on the interior of Lloyd Hotel.
