= Ruud Kuijer =

Dutch sculptor (born 1959)

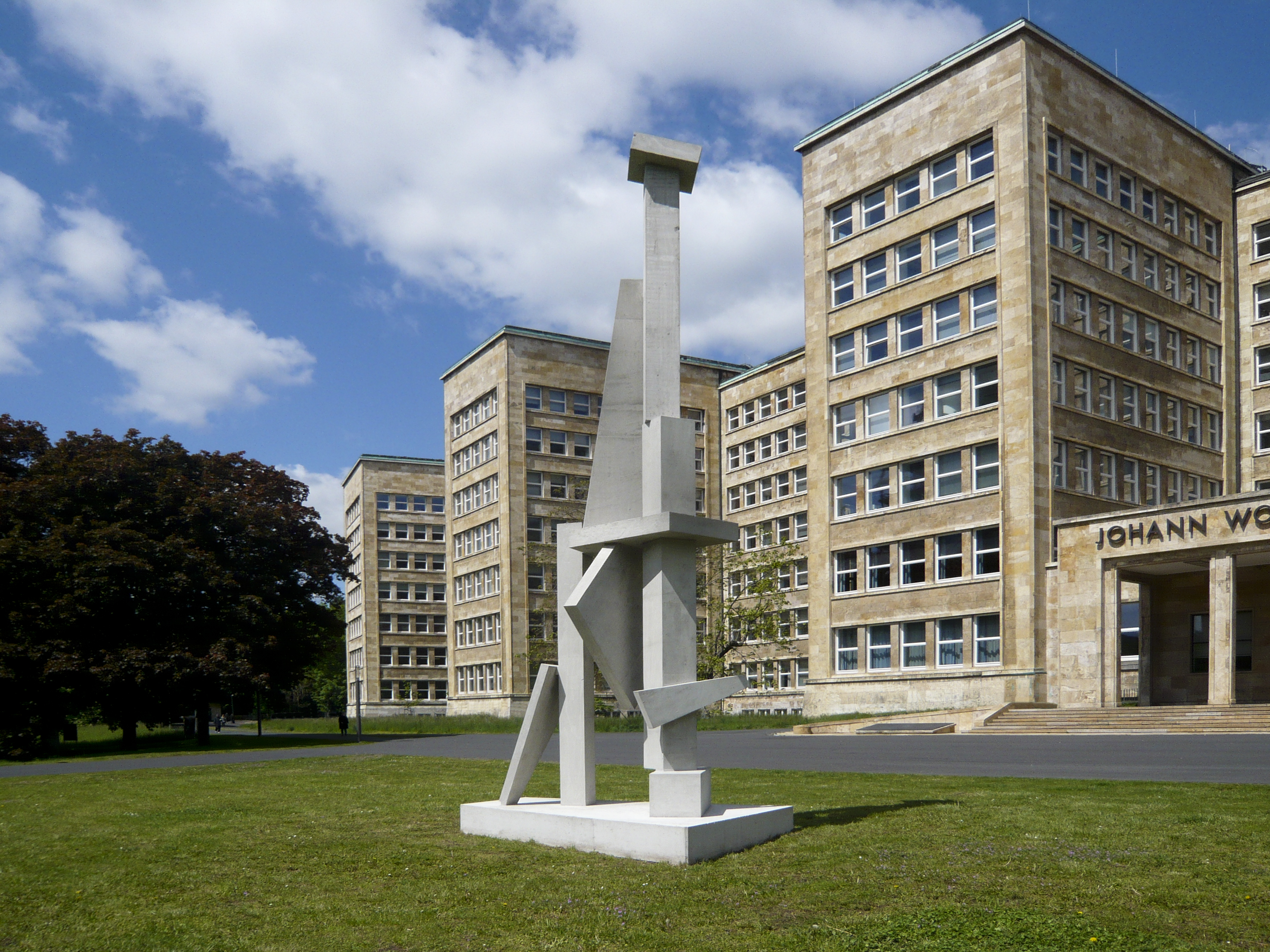
Ruud Kuijer at Blickachsen 12, Frankfurt (2019)

Ruud Kuijer (born 8 June 1959 in Schalkwijk) is a Dutch sculptor, particularly known for his Water works, a group of seven large-scale sculptures on the strip between Isotopenweg and the Amsterdam-Rhine Canal in Utrecht, The Netherlands.

== Life and work ==
After studying at St. Joost Academy of Art and Design in 's-Hertogenbosch from 1981 to 1984 and after having completed a postgraduate course at Jan van Eyck Academy in Maastricht from 1984 tot 1986, Ruud Kuijer went to live and work in Utrecht. As a sculptor, Ruud Kuijer became famous for his abstract sculptures in which he often incorporated recognisable shapes. The main focus of his work is the purely sculptural articulation of space which may or may not include references to content outside the sculpture.

Tradition and recent sculpture tradition play a significant role in his work, as does the continual desire to transcend these. Originally the focus was on finding and using the plastic qualities and expressive possibilities offered by the properties of ordinary materials such as iron, screw thread, carpet, rope, wood and concrete. These materials have little or no history when it comes to art. In recent years concrete has been the dominant material. Ruud Kuijer also works as a teacher. From 1992 to 1997 he taught at the Academy in Den Bosch and from 2007 to 2008 at the Academy of Arts in Berlin.

== Sculptures 1985-2003 ==
Between 1985 and 2003 he produced various series of sculptures whereby his point of departure was the specific possibilities offered by the materials used. In the sculptures belonging to the group entitled 'Staan/Liggen/Hangen/Leunen' (Standing/Lying Down/Hanging/Leaning) (1985-1992), the primary (structural) and secondary qualities (skin and colour) of various materials are coordinated and contrasted. These sculptures focus primarily on the concept of gravity: the individual weight of each separate part is rendered visible in the whole. The group entitled 'Gegalvaniseerd IJzer/Beton' (Galvanised Iron/Concrete) (1992-2001) is limited to the two materials stated. The galvanised iron comes from street furniture and other forms which, of course, have to be protected against rust. In this group, concrete is expressed simultaneously as a form and a link. The 'Draadeindsculpturen' (Threaded End Sculptures) (1996-2003) are an attempt to neutralise the rigid mechanics of nuts and bolts. The focus is on the inherent qualities of screw thread: it can act as both a line and a link. Physical concepts such as compressive and tensile force also become visible, particularly in combination with other forms or materials.

== Waterworks ==
Since 2001 Kuijer has been working on a group of seven large-scale sculptures on the strip between Isotopenweg and the Amsterdam-Rhine Canal, at Lage Weide industrial estate in Utrecht. These monumental, concrete sculptures are 12 metres high and up to 14 metres long. They are made from a single piece and a single material. In other words, they are monolithic sculptures. They basically consist of two materials: concrete and reinforcing rods.

The sculptures project has been specially made for the location. The group establishes relationships at a number of different levels with water and transport, and with the industrial surroundings of Lage Weide industrial estate. The sculptures contrast with the purely functional surroundings and add a human dimension to the immense and expansive area. Kuijer used forms based on the scale of our own body as a mould. The sculptures contain references to water, for example, a moulded rowing boat, surfboard and a garden pond.

One specific possibility offered by concrete is making imprints. Water Work IV Overstag (Go About) uses, more so than in the other sculptures, the richly contrasting and expressive possibilities of the sculptor's skin.

Between 2010 and 2013 a sloping embankment was created between the sculptures. This tailoring of the landscape links the sculptures together to form a tight-knit unit. From the point of view of urban planning this anchors the project firmly in the surroundings. Nowadays the sculptures are also illuminated at night. Water Work VII Cohesie (Cohesion) is the final element in the series and is also the tallest, at 12.70 metres high. This sculpture is located next to the Werkspoorbrug along the banks of the Amsterdam-Rhine Canal, at the crossing of the international rail and water links between our country and the rest of Europe. Two shapes in the sculpture contain a repeating motif of the coats of arms of the cities of Amsterdam, Utrecht and Basel. One shape is visible for passing ships and the other stands at eye level for passing train passengers. The whole project was unveiled in March 2013 as part of the celebrations to mark the 300th anniversary of the Treaty of Utrecht (1713-2013).

Ruud Kuijer is an artist who has initiated large-scale sculpture projects in public spaces. For the Water Works project, he arranged funding and business support, constructed a workshop, and obtained the necessary permits. The project is located in the Netherlands. His work on Water Works led to him receiving the Fentener van Vlissingen Culture Prize in 2004 and the Dutch Concrete Award in 2005.

- 2002 Water Work I, Forward
- 2003 Water Work II, Bearable Lightness
- 2005 Water Work III, Chardonnay
- 2007 Water Work IV, Overstag
- 2009 Water Work V, Circuit
- 2011 Water Work VI, Weerslag
- 2013 Water Work VII, Cohesie

== Exhibitions (selection) ==
- 1986 Wentzel Gallery, Cologne
- 1987 Waalkens Gallery, Finsterwolde
- 1989 Wentzel Gallery, Cologne
- 1990 Central Museum, Utrecht
- 1990 Living room exhibition by Benno Premsela and Friso Broeksma, Amsterdam
- 1991 Wentzel Gallery, Cologne
- 1995 Southworth International Group, Portland, ME (USA)
- 1996 Municipal Museum The Hague
- 1997 Wilhelm Lehmbruck Museum, Duisburg
- 2000 Waalkens Gallery, Finsterwolde
- 2009 Central Museum, Utrecht
- 2011 Gerken Gallery, Berlin
- 2014 Rijksmuseum van Oudheden, Rijksmuseum Volkenkunde, Museum Boerhaave, Leiden
- 2014 Museum Beelden aan Zee, The Hague
- 2017 ARTZUID, International Sculpture Biennale Amsterdam (group exhibition)
- 2017 Villa Wessel, Iserlohn
- 2017-2018 City of Arts and Sciences, Valencia
- 2019 Galerie Slewe, Amsterdam (with Lon Pennock)
- 2019 Sculpture biennale BLICKACHSEN 12, Frankfurt and surroundings (group exhibition)
- 2020 Galerie Slewe, Amsterdam (with Krijn de Koning)
- 2020-2021 Gerhard Marcks Haus, Bremen

== Commissions ==
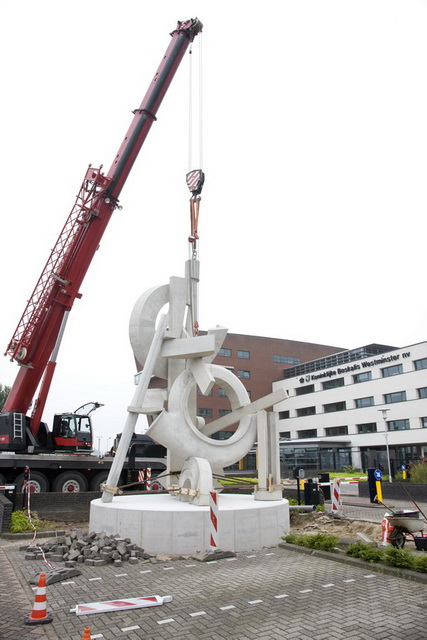
Springtij at Boskalis in 2008

- 2008 Springtij (Spring Tide), sculpture for the head office of Royal Boskalis BV in Papendrecht
- 2009 Alliance, Sculpture for the port of Melbourne in Australia
- 2010 Group of 13 sculptures for the Parkhaven neighbourhood in Utrecht commissioned by Bouwfonds ASR
- 2016 Ocean Reef I and II two sculptures for two artificial islands in front of the coast of Panama-City, Panama
- 2017 Hangend Vlak, sculpture for ArtZuid 2017, International Sculpture Biennale Amsterdam
- 2023 Welland, sculpture for Rotterdam at the Charloisse Hoofd

== Collections ==
Ruud Kuijer's works are included in collections of, among others:

- Bonnefanten Museum, Maastricht
- Centraal Museum, Utrecht
- Municipal Museum, The Hague
- Lehmbruck Museum, Duisburg
- Gerhard-Marcks-Haus, Bremen
- Stedelijk Museum, Amsterdam
- Private collections in the Netherlands, Belgium, Germany, Spain, the United States, and Australia.

== Gallery ==
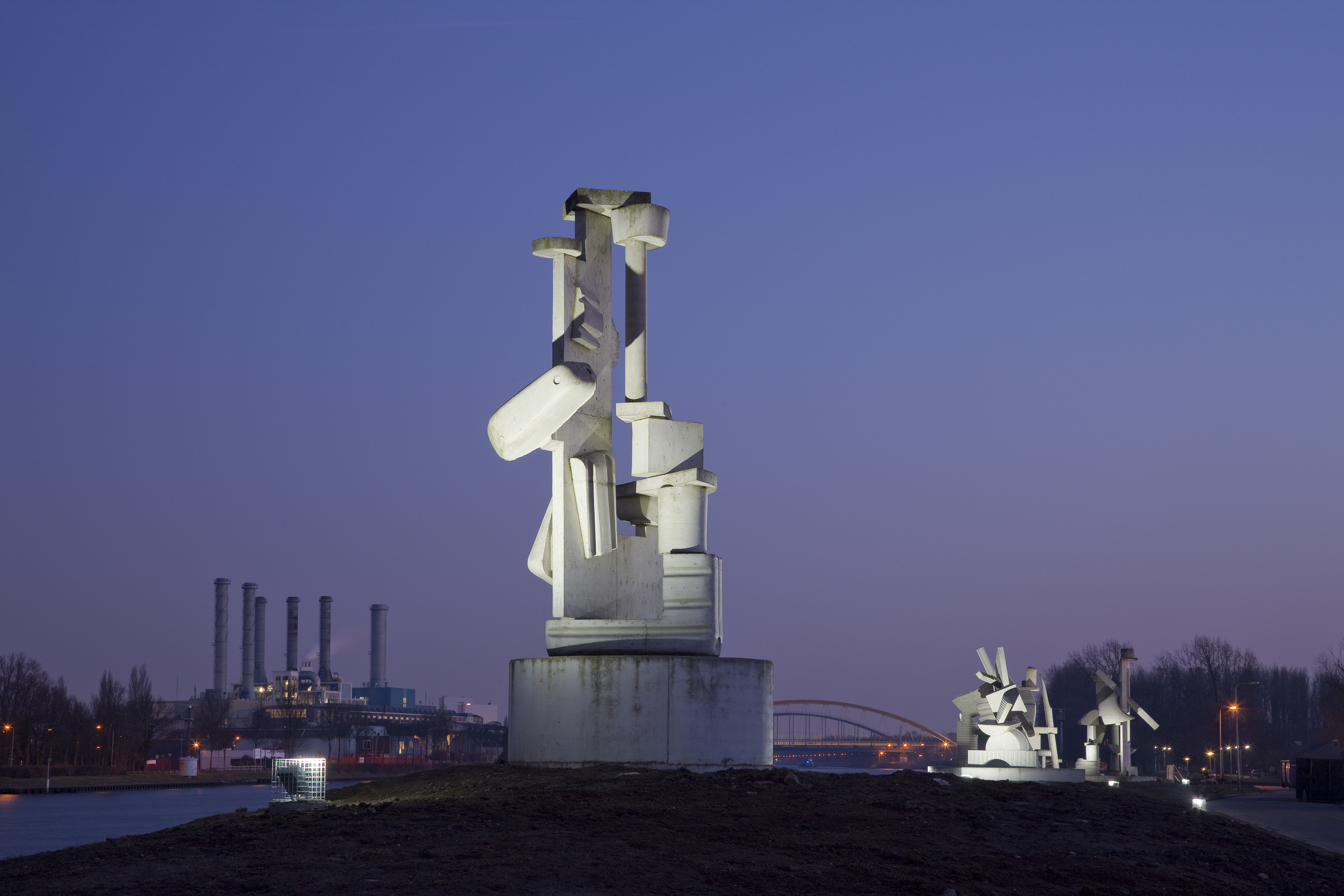
Water Work I Forward (2002)

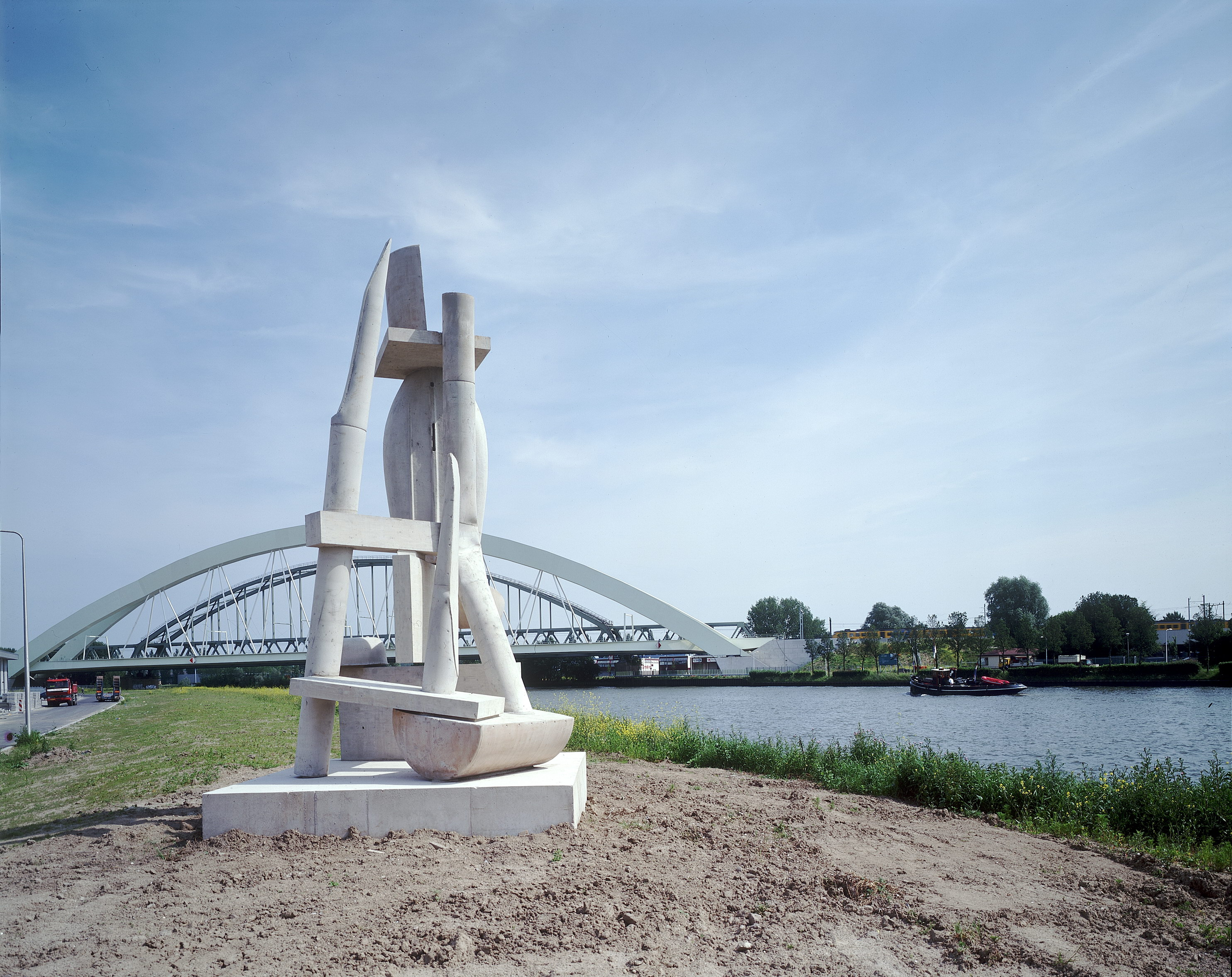
Water Work II Bearable Lightness (2003)

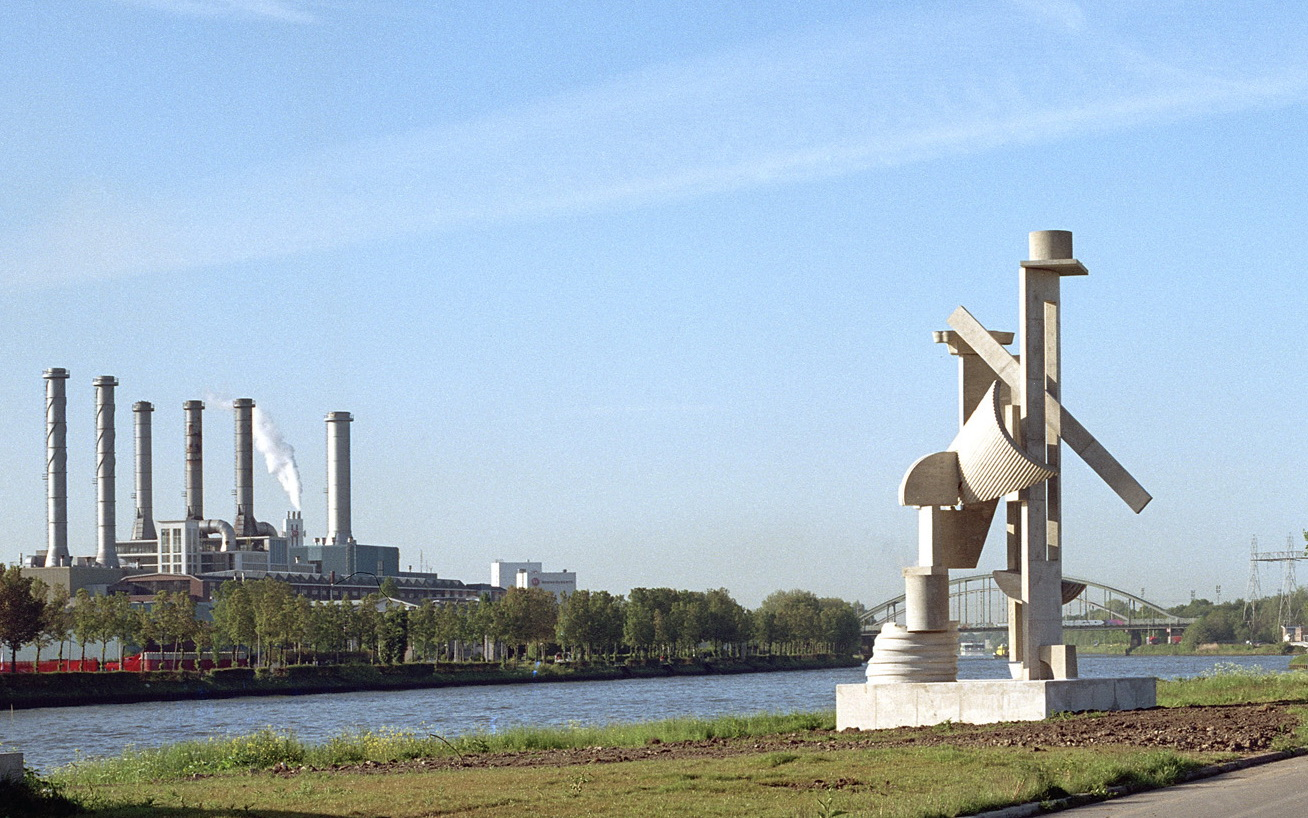
Water Work III Chardonnay (2005)

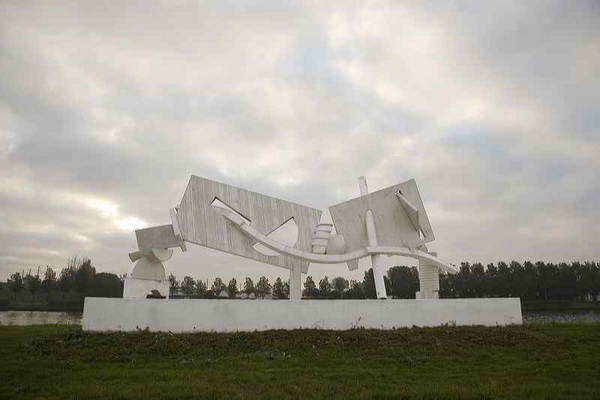
Water Work IV Overstag (2007)

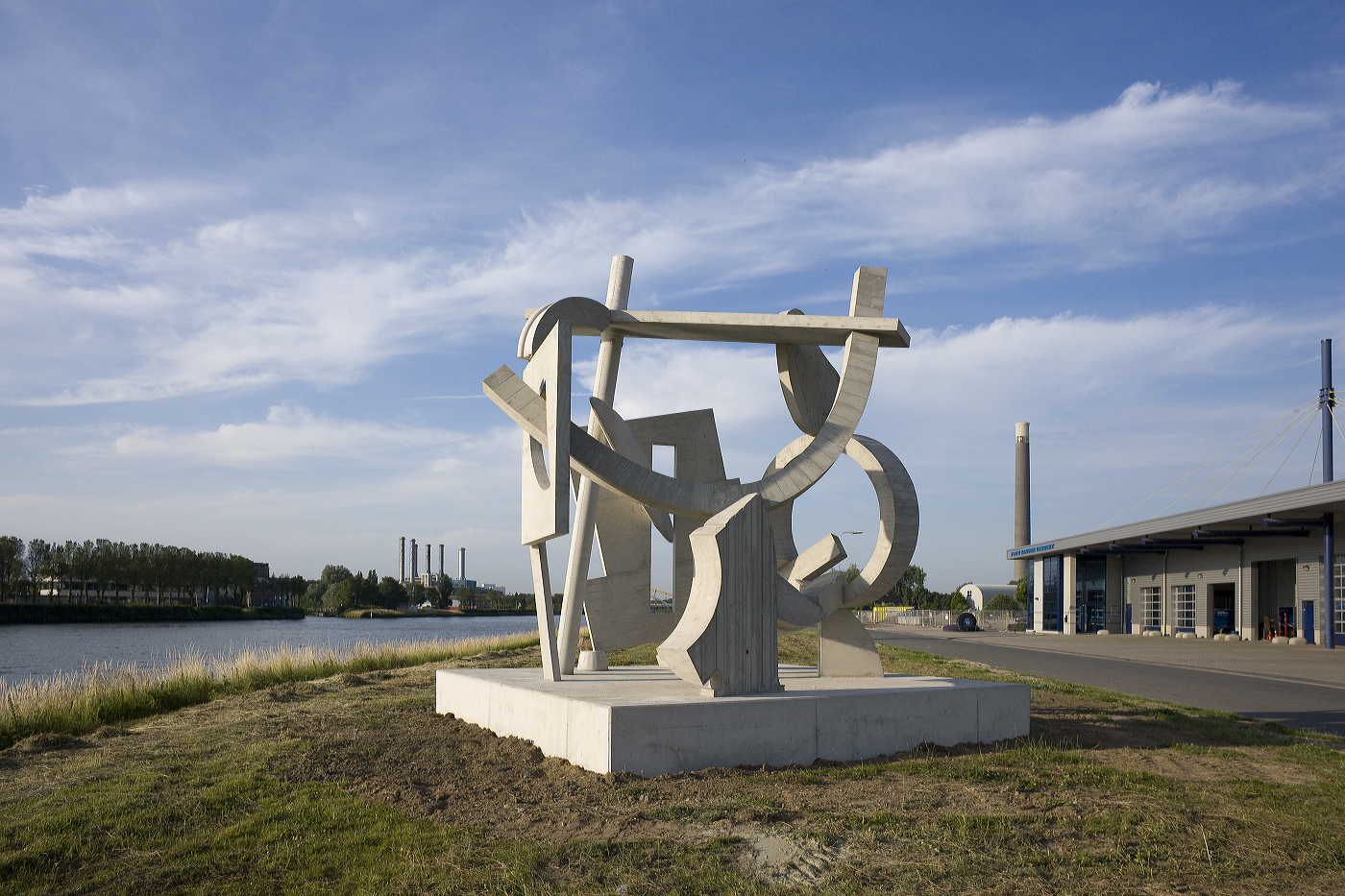
Water Work V Circuit (2009)

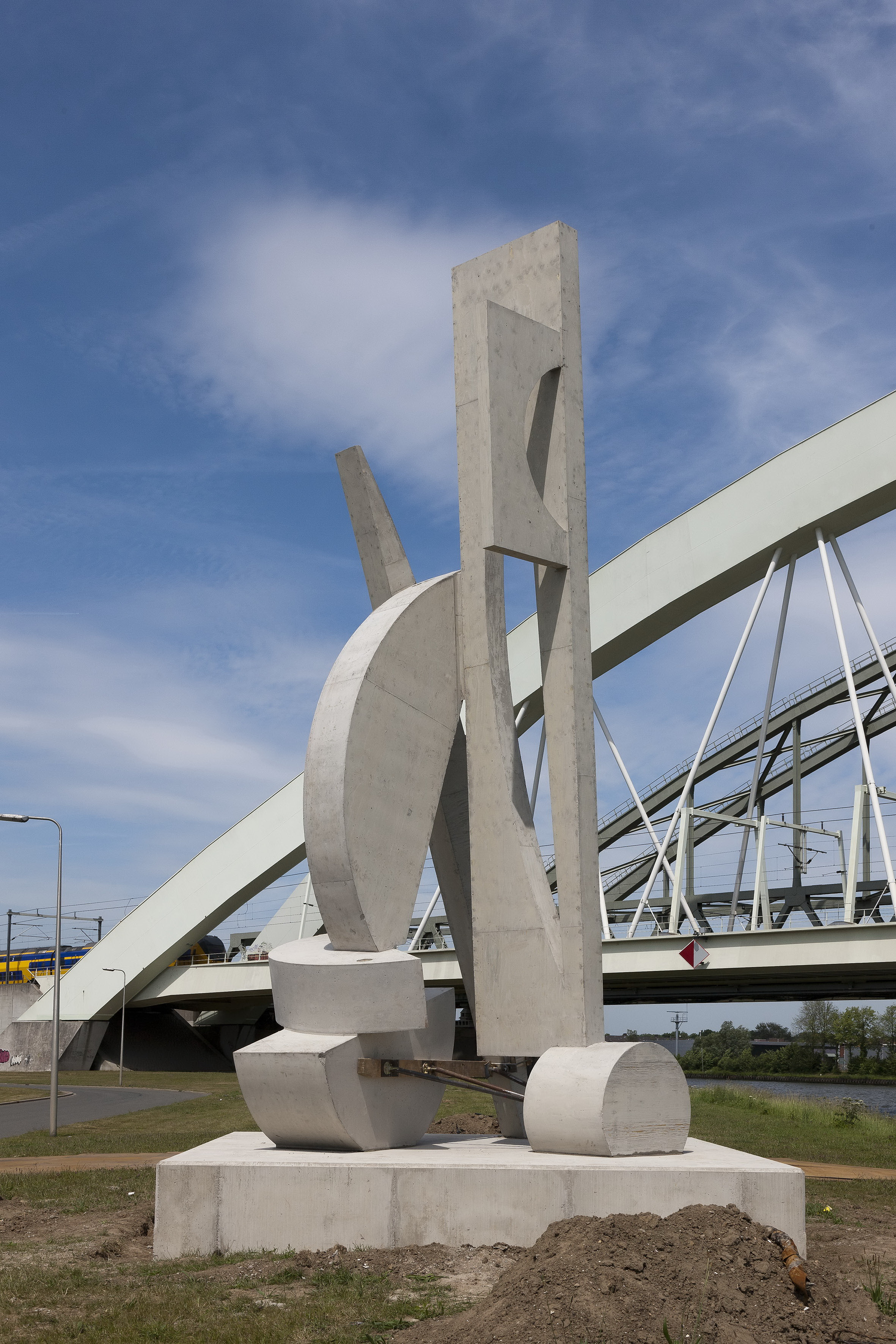
Water Work VI Weerslag (2011)

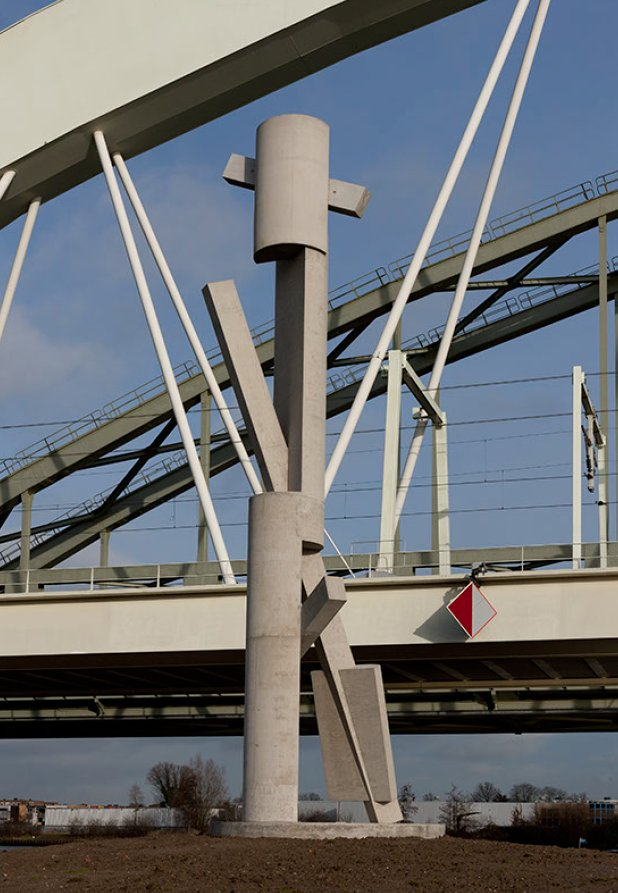
Water Work VII Cohesie (2013)

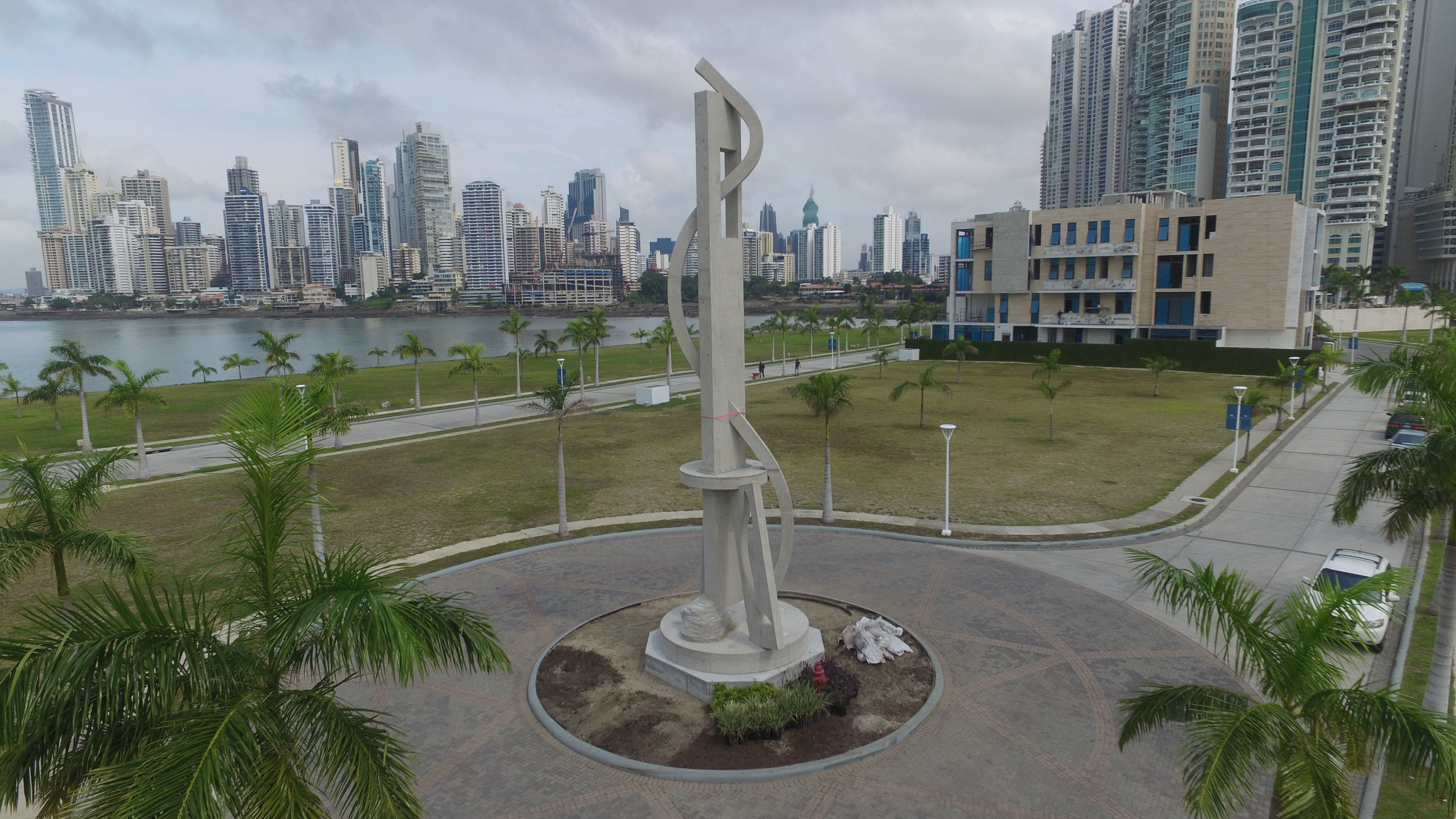
Ocean Reef I Ruud Kuijer Panama City (2016)

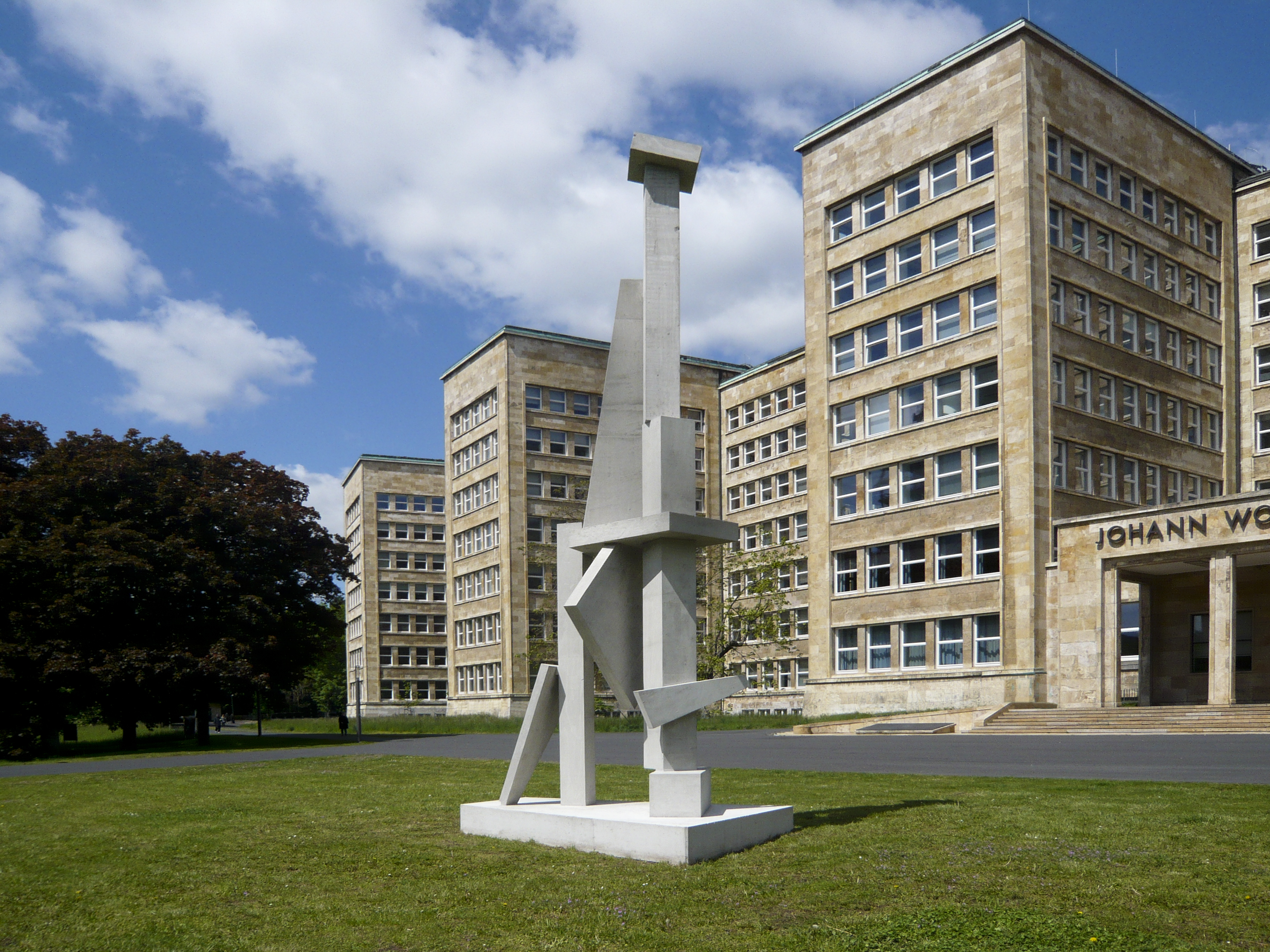
Hangend Vlak in Frankfurt - Blickachsen 12 (2019)

== Publications ==
- 2018 Abstractie-Ruimte-Staal, about the work of André Volten. Catalog text at the exhibition Utopia of André Volten at museum Beelden aan Zee, The Hague. Waanders publishers, Zwolle ISBN 978 94 6262 1824
- 2019 Ruud Kuijer: Over Sculptuur, Notities van een maker en beschouwer. NAI010 publishers, Rotterdam ISBN 978-94-6208-523-7
- 2019 Ruud Kuijer: On Sculpture, Reflections by a Maker and Observer. NAI010 publishers, Rotterdam ISBN 978-94-6208-533-6
- 2019 Ruud Kuijer: Über Skulptur, Notizen eines Machers und Betrachters. NAI010 publishers, Rotterdam ISBN 978-94-6208-532-9

== Literature ==
- 1990 Beelden 1988–1989, Central Museum, Utrecht, ISBN 90-73285-01-1
- 1996 Hout/IJzer, IJzer/Beton, Baustoffe der Plastik, Minister Paul Museum The Hague/Wilhelm, Lehmbruck Museum, Duisburg, ISBN 90-6730-112-4
- 2005 Landveroveren, Publication to accompany the Fentener van Vlissingen Culture Prize
- 2009 Alliance, Publication by the Port of Melbourne Cooperation to accompany the presentation of the sculpture of the same name in Melbourne
- 2009 Ruud Kuijer Beelden/Sculpture, Central Museum, Utrecht/ Wilhelm Lehmbruck Museum, Duisburg, ISBN 978-90-5983-802-4
- 2011 Ruud Kuijer, Gerken Gallery, Berlin
- 2013 Ruud Kuijer, Waterwerken / Water Works, Nai010 publishers, Rotterdam, ISBN 978 94 6208 072 0
- 2014 Ruud Kuijer BLVD, published by museum Beelden aan Zee, The Hague, ISBN 978-90-76028-20-0

== Films & Television ==
- 2009 Alliance, film by the Amsterdamse Filmstichting about the realisation of the sculpture Alliance in the harbour of Melbourne
- Celebration of the end of dredging with unveiling of a ten meter high sculpture, Alicia Gorey reporting for Channel 9 News, West Melbourne 25 November 2009, 1.48 min.
- Dutch Treat, Nick McCallum reporting for Channel 7 News, Melbourne, 25 November 2009, 1.33 min.
- 2009 Ruud Kuijer Sculptor, a film by the Amsterdamse Filmstichting
- The Waterwerken of Ruud Kuijer, AVRO KunstUur, 7 February 2009, Nederland 2, rubric Van de straat
- 2013 DocU Waterwerken, film by Jos Kuijer and Caspar Haspels, RTV Utrecht, every hour in the weekend of the 5th and 6 October 2013
