= Albert Waalkens =

Dutch farmer and gallery owner

Albert Waalkens (Finsterwolde, 8 June 1920 - there, 1 April 2007) was a Dutch farmer, gallery owner of Galery Waalkens and avant-garde art promoter.

== Life and work ==
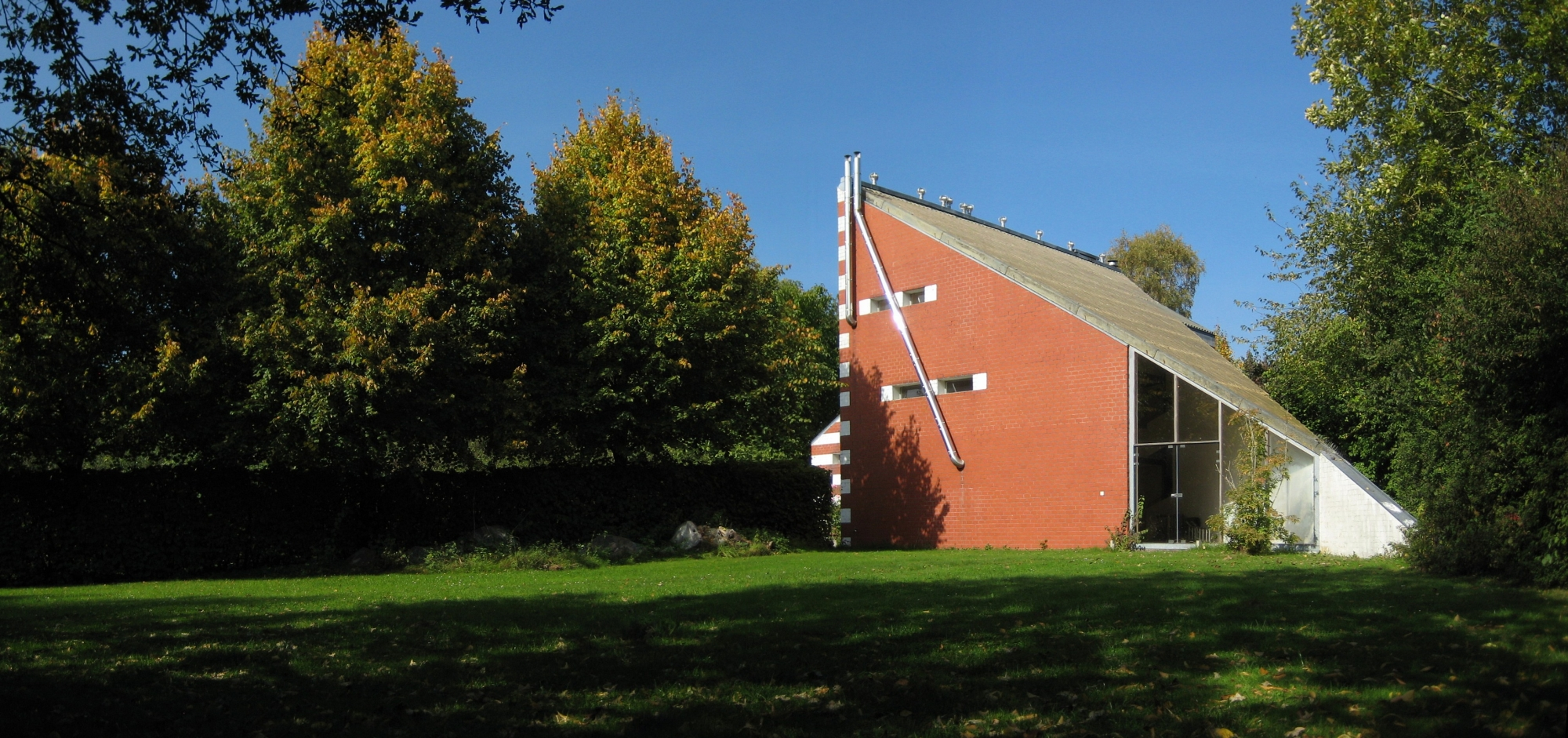
Galery Waalkens in Finsterwolde designed by architect and artist Gunnar Daan (2008).

Waalkens started an art gallery in the stable of his farm in the 1960s, where experimental artists were offered a place to exhibit their works. Moreover, he offered the artists and their families shelter on his country estate. In those days, Finsterwolde became a magnet for young artists from the Randstad.

In 1963 Waalkens organized an exhibition along the public road in the municipality under the title "Statues in Finsterwolde" with the sculpture of ten artists. This evolved into the 1967 exhibition along the public road of 200 sculptures by 63 artists, which stretched from the city of Groningen to the east of the province of Groningen.

In 1997 Waalkens organized his last notable exhibition, named the Koetekendagen (Cow-drawing-days), whereby thirty artists were presented drawing, painting or sculpturing cows.

In 2000 Waalkens received the Benno Premsela Prize from the Netherlands Foundation for Visual Arts for his stimulating attitude towards artists. Earlier, in 1989, he had been awarded the Zilveren Anjer by Prince Bernhard because of his merits to the art.

Albert Waalkens was the father of the former PvdA member of parliament Harm Evert Waalkens, who, like his father, is a farmer in Finsterwolde. Albert Waalkens died at the age of 86.
