= Suzanne Oxenaar =

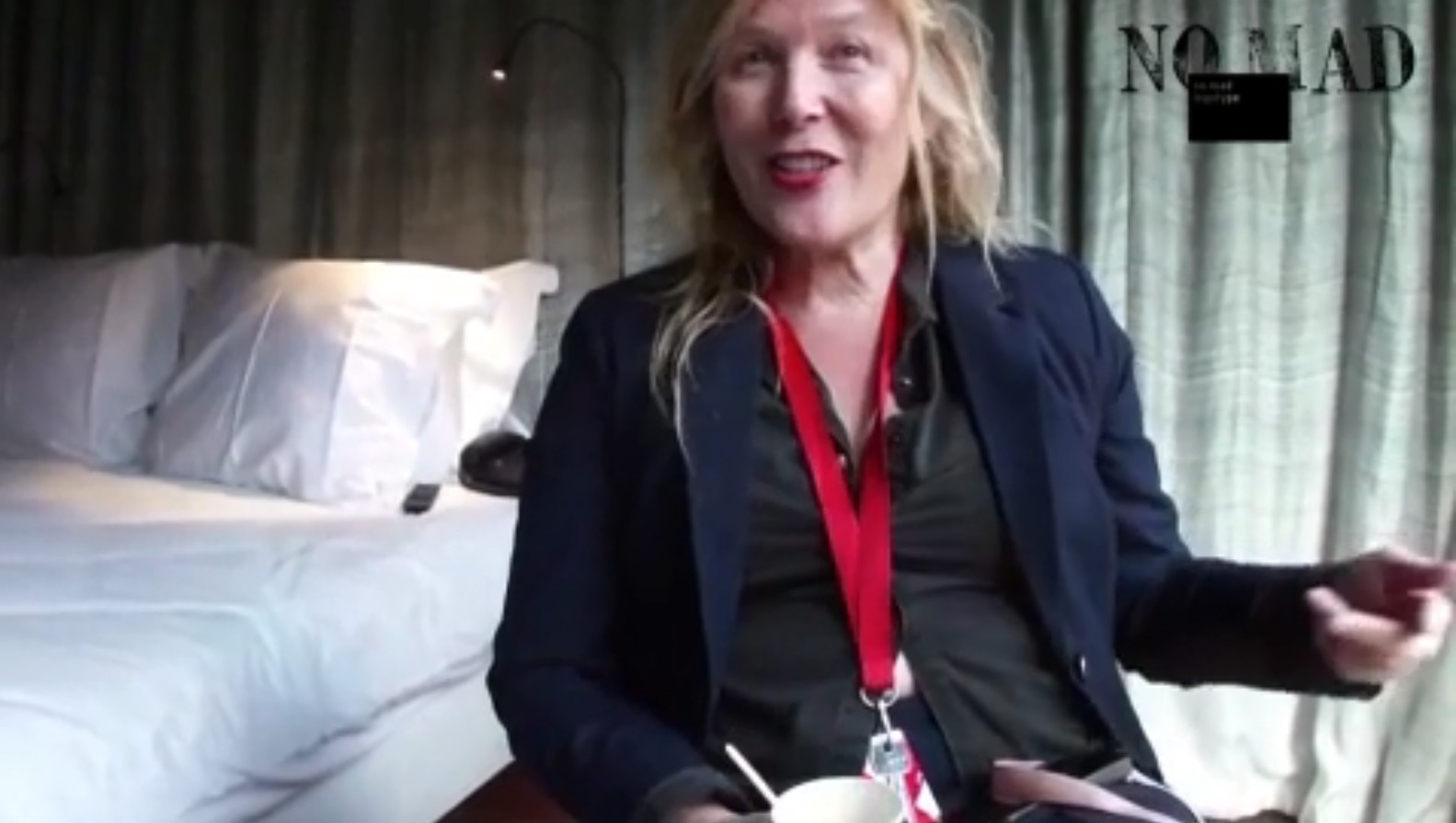
- Interview with Susanne Oxenaar, 2012
- Born: 1950s–1960s
- Occupation: Cultural entrepreneur
- Parent(s): Rudi Oxenaar; Thil Oxenaar-van der Haagen
- Awards: Benno Premsela Prize, 2009

Suzanne Oxenaar (born 1950s–1960s) is a Dutch cultural entrepreneur, designer and co-founder and artistic director of the Lloyd Hotel in Amsterdam.

== Biography ==
Oxenaar is the daughter of Rudi Oxenaar, former director of the Kröller-Müller Museum, and Thil Oxenaar-van der Haagen (1931-1985). Her brother Aart Oxenaar (1958) is director of the Academy of Architecture in Amsterdam.

Oxenaar came into prominence in the late 1980s with the renovation of an old Amsterdam theater into an art center. In 1990 with her own office she managed an art exhibition in Loevestein Castle with artists such as Klaas Gubbels, David van de Kop, Gabriëlle van de Laak and Bořek Šípek.

Another of her early adventures was the initiation of the Supper Club in Amsterdam in 1991. A year later in 1992 she managed to transform an old hospital in Gorkum into a temporary exhibition space.

Later, in the 1990s and with the historian Otto Nan, she developed a plan to renovate an old Lloyd office in Amsterdam into the Lloyd Hotel, which opened its doors in 2004. In 2009 Oxenaar was awarded the Benno Premsela Prize.

== Publications ==
- Shuzo Azuchi Gulliver, Suzanne Oxenaar, Pierre Tuning. Ambition/field climbing: project in de 'Historische Tuin Aalsmeer' 1996. Mondriaan Fund, 1997
- Suzanne Oxenaar (ed), Het vijfde seizoen, Amsterdam: SKOR, 2002.
