= Benno Premsela Prize =

Dutch design prize

- Native name: Benno Premselaprijs
- Description: Award for stimulating roles in visual arts, design, or architecture
- Country: Netherlands
- Presented by: Mondriaan Fonds (formerly Fonds BKVB)
- Reward: €40,000
- Website: https://web.archive.org/web/20180913185455/https://www.mondriaanfonds.nl/leestafel/oeuvreprijzen-benno-premselaprijs-prijs-voor-de-kunstkritiek-fonds-bkvb/

The Benno Premsela Prize is a former Dutch design prize, awarded every two years from 2000 to 2012 by the Mondriaan Fonds to a person who has played a stimulating role in the field of visual arts, design or architecture. The prize is named after designer Benno Premsela, who died in 1997, and who himself had played a central role in post-war Dutch art and design. The prize consisted of a sum of money of 40,000 euros.

== Award winners, a selection ==
- 2000: Albert Waalkens
- 2002: Riekje Swart
- 2007: Renny Ramakers and Gijs Bakker
- 2009: Suzanne Oxenaar
- 2011: Wim van Krimpen
