= Benno Premsela =

Dutch designer, visual artist and art collector

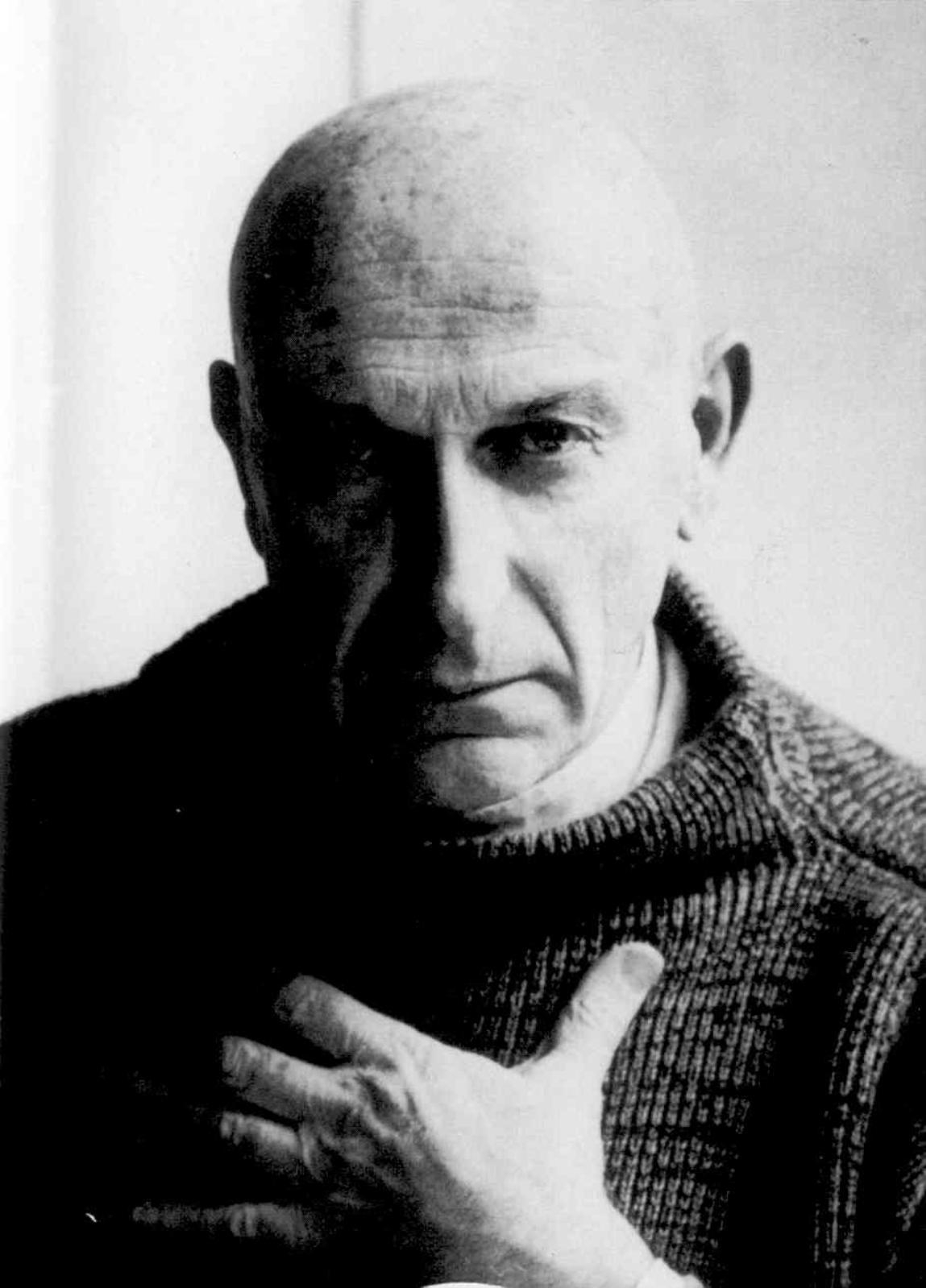
- Born: 4 May 1920; Amsterdam
- Died: 27 March 1997 (aged 76); Amsterdam
- Education: Nieuwe Kunstschool
- Occupations: designer, artist and art collector

Benno Premsela (Amsterdam, 4 May 1920 – Amsterdam, 27 March 1997) was a Dutch designer, visual artist and art collector. As designer he was active as textile artist, industrial designer and interior designer.

== Biography ==
Premsela was born and raised in Amsterdam. He was the son of Benedictus Premsela, general practitioner and sexologist, en Rosalie de Boers. After his secondary education he attended the Nieuwe Kunstschool (New Art School) from 1937 to 1940. Premsela was Jewish and one of the only members of his family to survive the Holocaust in the Netherlands.

From 1956 to 1973 he was head of display window decoration at De Bijenkorf. He joined the Amsterdam Council for the Arts, which he chaired from 1961 to 1970. In 1972 he became chairman of the board of directors of the Gerrit Rietveld Academie.

Premsela was also chairman of the COC Nederland and made an important contribution to the acceptance of homosexuality in the Netherlands. The Benno Premsela Prize initiated in 2000 was named after Premsela. in 2002 a new national institute for design was named after him as well, the Premsela Dutch Platform for Design and Fashion.
