= Finsterwolde =

- Village
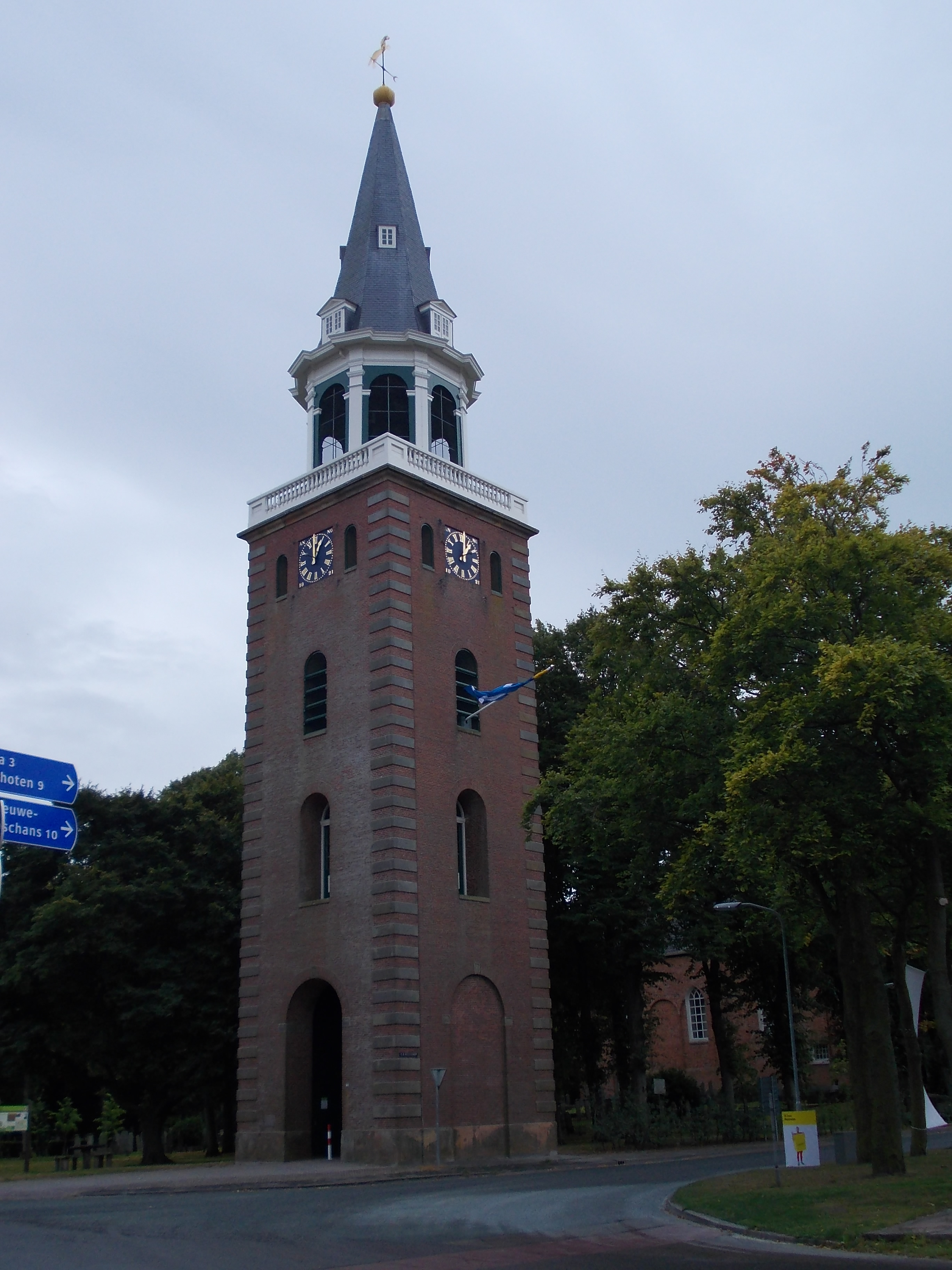
- Bell tower of the Protestant Church in 2012

- Location of Finsterwolde in the province of Groningen Finsterwolde (Netherlands)
- Coordinates: 53°11′53″N 7°5′1″E
- Country: Netherlands
- Province: Groningen
- Municipality: Oldambt

Area
  - Total: 42.13 km^{2} (16.27 sq mi)
- Elevation: 1.2 m (3.9 ft)

Population (2021)
  - Total: 2,295
  - Density: 54.47/km^{2} (141.1/sq mi)
- Time zone: UTC+1 (CET)
  - Summer (DST): UTC+2 (CEST)
- Postal code: 9684
- Dialing code: 0597

Finsterwolde (Dutch pronunciation: [ˌfɪnstərˈʋɔldə]) is a village in the Dutch province of Groningen, about 7 km northeast of the city of Winschoten. Finsterwolde was a separate municipality until 1990, when it was merged with Beerta into Reiderland. In 2010 Reiderland merged into the municipality Oldambt. The old municipality of Finsterwolde included six small nearby or connecting settlements. These are also taken into account in the population estimate of 2008, without which the actual population, purely based on the centre and new developments, would be 1250. The village is known for the Galery Waalkens.

== History ==
The town was named "Little Moscow" by Time magazine in 1950, because communists have always had the majority of the votes since 1933.

In July 1951, the elected municipality council was replaced by a regeringscommissaris, who ruled Finsterwolde until September 1953.

== Born in Finsterwolde ==
- Albert Waalkens (1920-2007), Dutch farmer and gallery owner
- Arie Haan (1948), Dutch footballer and coach

== Gallery ==
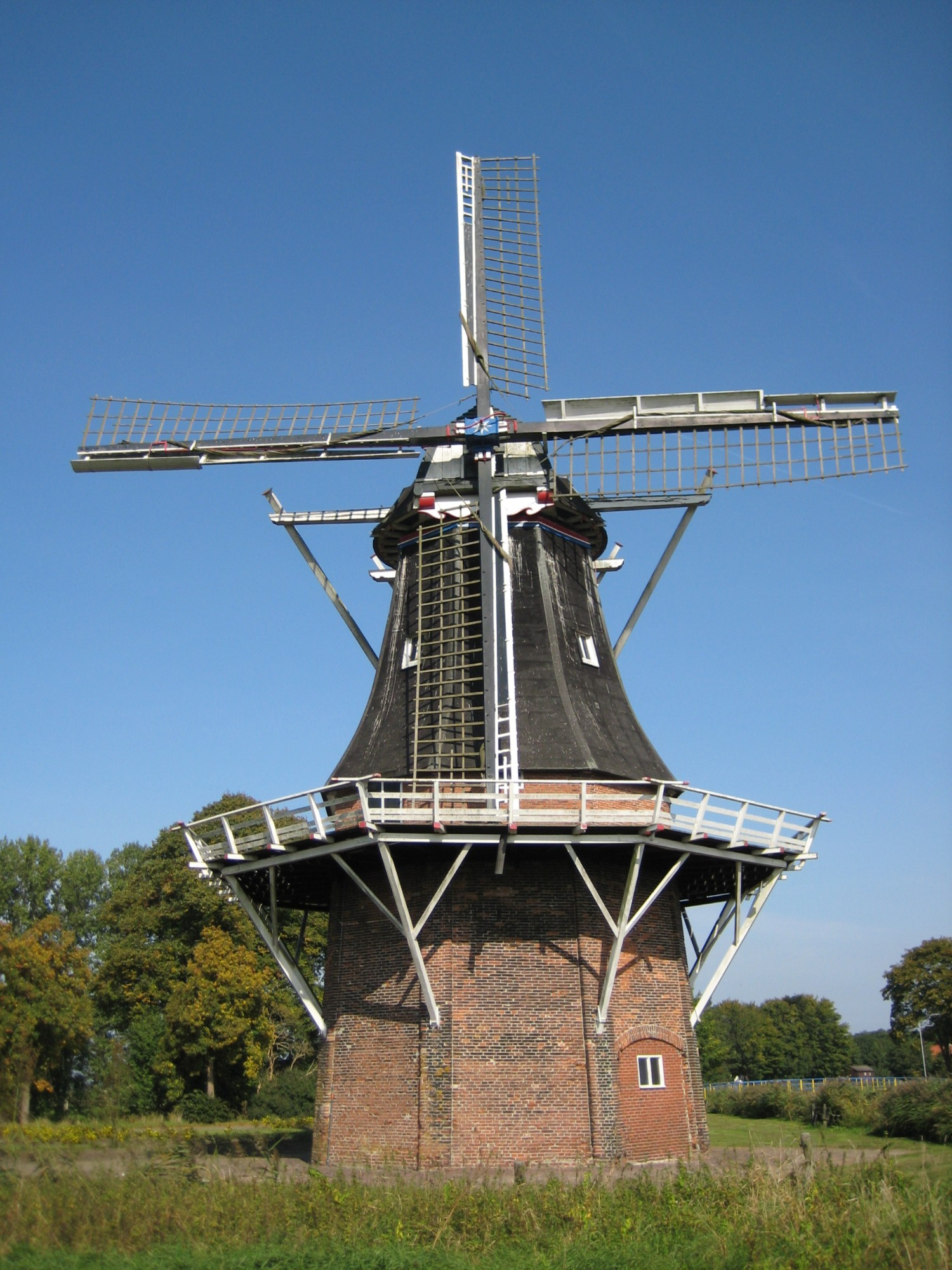
Wind mill De Hoop

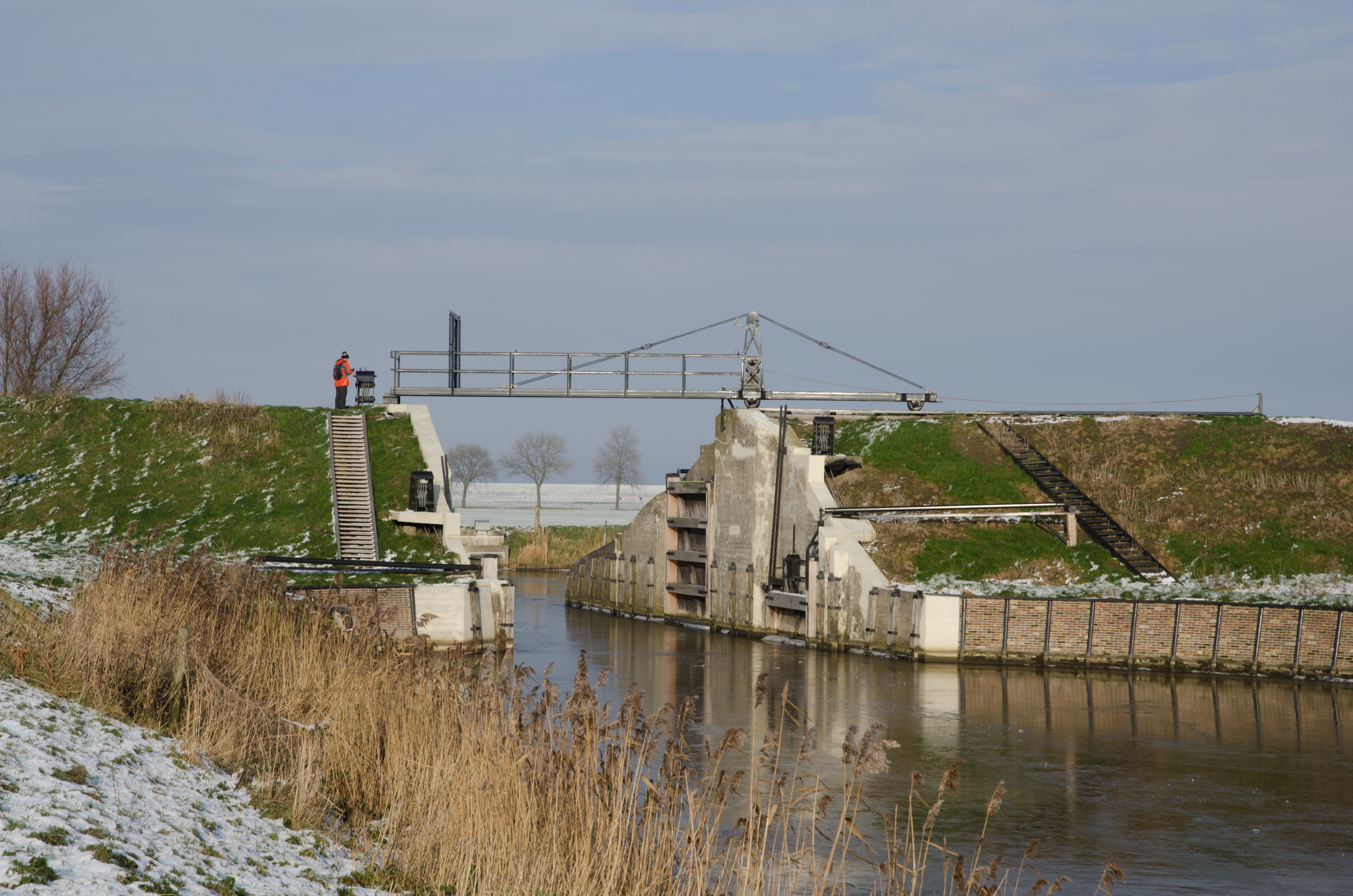
Sluice near Finsterwolde

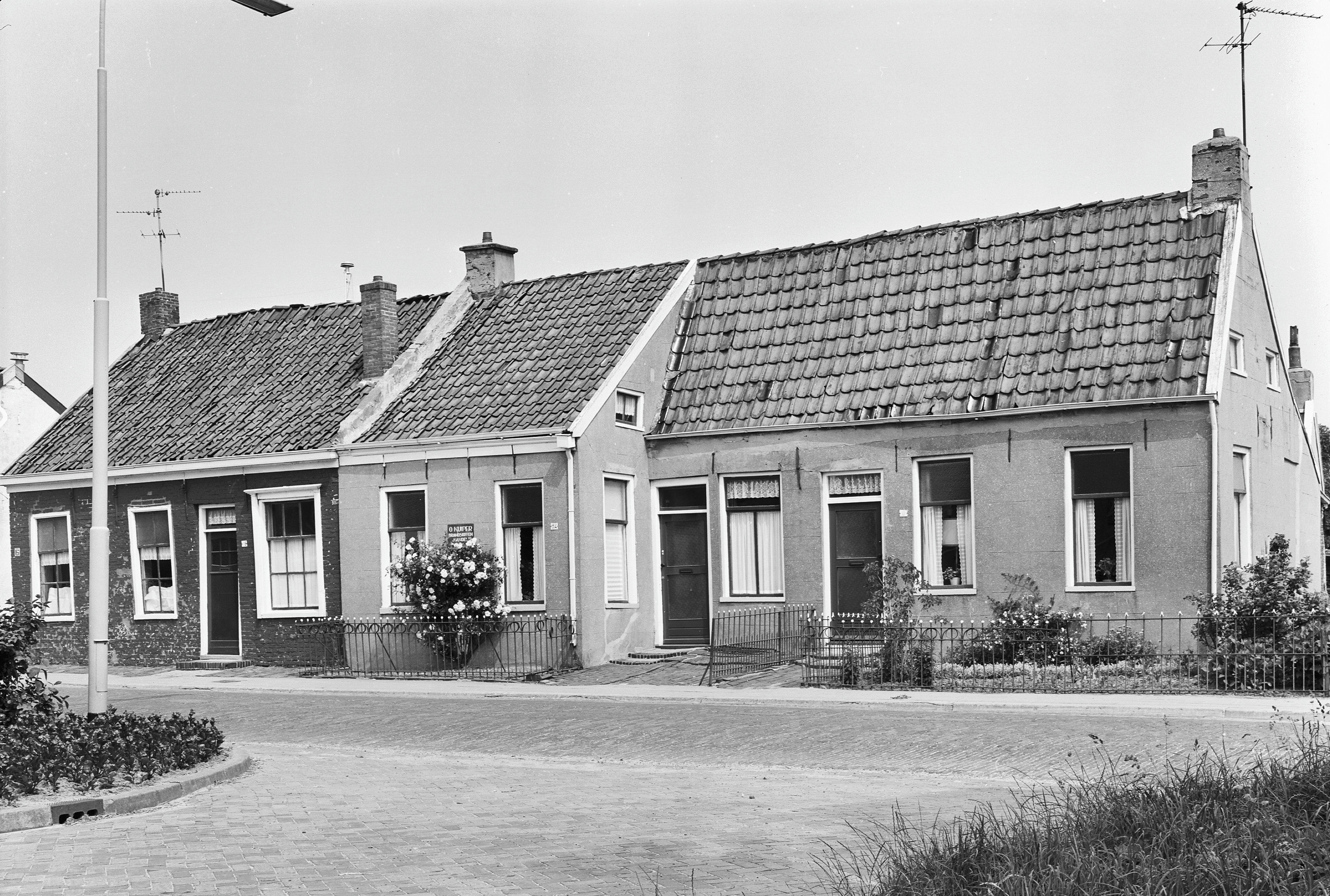
Houses in Finsterwolde (1968)

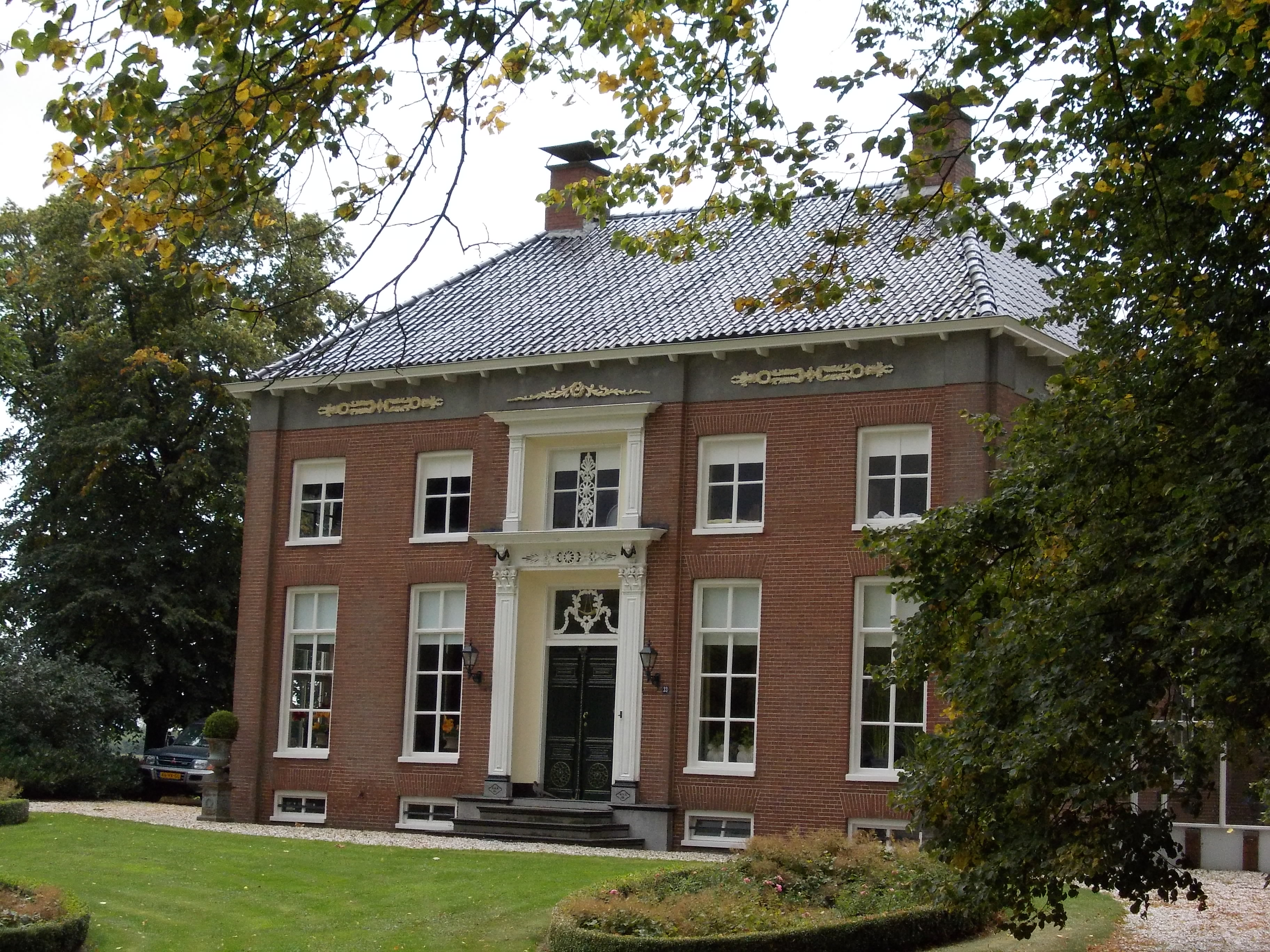
Villa in Finsterwolde
