= List of Labour Party (Netherlands) senators =

This is a list of members of the Senate of the Netherlands for the Labour Party (PvdA).

== List ==
Member	Start date	End date	Ref.
Hedy d'Ancona	17 September 1974	10 September 1981	
Hedy d'Ancona	31 August 1982	12 September 1983	
Liesbeth Baarveld-Schlaman	10 June 1981	12 June 1995	
Pit Bakker	11 May 1982	12 September 1983	
Marleen Barth	7 June 2011	7 February 2018	
Joop van den Berg	14 April 1992	31 July 1996	
Eric van den Bergh	16 September 1980	9 June 1981	
Jannette Beuving	7 June 2011	27 March 2018	
Paul Boersma	23 June 1987	24 January 1990	
Joop Borgman	23 June 1987	10 June 1991	
Jan Broeksz	17 January 1956	15 September 1980	
Edward Brongersma	23 July 1946	22 July 1950	
Edward Brongersma	5 February 1963	19 September 1977	
Jaap Burger	5 June 1963	30 September 1970	
George Cammelbeeck	15 July 1952	9 May 1971	
Frits Castricum	8 June 1999	9 June 2003	
Cees de Cloe	3 October 1978	15 September 1980	
Clovis Cnoop Koopmans	10 November 1981	14 August 1982	
Job Cohen	13 June 1995	2 August 1998	
Jaap Cramer	23 July 1946 (Note: He had been a senator on behalf of the Social Democratic Workers' Party before the July 1946 Senate election.)	14 July 1951	
Ferd Crone	11 June 2019	12 June 2023 (Note: He continued to serve as a senator in the GroenLinks–PvdA group.)	
Barend van Dam	25 August 1970	9 May 1971	
Piet Damming	20 September 1966	12 April 1970	
Freek Derks	16 September 1980	12 September 1983	
Ton Doesburg	8 June 1999	9 June 2003	
Ton Doesburg	30 September 2003	11 June 2007	
Nico Donkersloot	23 July 1946 (Note: He had been an independent senator before the July 1946 Senate election.)	26 February 1949	
Hugo de Dreu	19 February 1947	26 July 1948	
Hugo de Dreu	25 August 1948	19 September 1960	
Simon van Driel	10 June 2003	6 June 2011	
Adri Duivesteijn	5 February 2013	8 June 2015	
Jean Eigeman	10 June 2003	6 June 2011	
Greet Ermen	16 September 1980	12 June 1995	
Henk van Es	25 May 1965	15 September 1969	
Mary Fiers	3 April 2018	10 June 2019 (Note: She later served as a senator in the GroenLinks–PvdA group.)	
Mary Fiers	12 October 2021	12 June 2023 (Note: She continued to serve as a senator in the GroenLinks–PvdA group.)	
Annemarie Grewel	13 June 1995	27 February 1998	
Gerrit Jan van Heuven Goedhart	22 October 1947	31 December 1950	
Gijs van Hall	31 July 1956	9 May 1971	
Jan Hamel	10 June 2003	11 June 2007	
Jan Hamel	22 September 2009	6 June 2011	
Cathrijn Haubrich-Gooskens	12 June 2007	6 June 2011	
Wim Hendriks	9 September 1975	18 September 1977	
Ien van den Heuvel	17 September 1974	16 September 1979	
Arnold Hijmans	10 June 1981	12 September 1983	
Jan Hoogland	23 July 1946	19 September 1960	
Jan Hoogland	18 October 1960	27 December 1961	
Leny Jansen-van der Gevel	17 February 1987	22 June 1987	
Ria Jaarsma	23 June 1987	9 June 2003	
Sijtze de Jong	19 June 1951	14 July 1952	
Sijtze de Jong	6 November 1956	15 September 1969	
Jan Jonkman	27 July 1948	19 September 1966	
Erik Jurgens	13 June 1995	11 June 2007	
Paul Kapteijn	19 September 1950	19 September 1960	
Paul Kapteijn	8 November 1960	19 September 1966	
Hamit Karaku	2 March 2021	12 June 2023	
Jan Kassies	23 June 1987	12 June 1995	
Jo van de Kieft	23 July 1946	14 July 1952	
Arie Kievit	14 April 1948	26 July 1948	
Arie Kievit	30 March 1949	17 September 1951	
Eefje Klaassens-Postema	23 June 1987	10 June 1991	
Geert Klein Bennink	23 June 1987	10 June 1991	
André Kloos	5 June 1963	30 April 1982	
Gerard Kolthoff	25 May 1971	9 June 1981	
Anne Koning	18 June 2013	8 June 2015	
Ruud Koole	7 June 2011	8 June 2015	
Ruud Koole	11 June 2019	12 June 2023	
Bram Koopman	25 May 1971	30 November 1978	
Jacob Kramer	23 July 1946	3 November 1956	
Roelof Kranenburg	23 July 1946 (Note: He had been a senator on behalf of Free-thinking Democratic League before the July 1946 Senate election.)	31 May 1951	
Chris van Krimpen	23 November 1976	9 June 1981	
Trix van Kuilenburg-Lodder	13 September 1983	12 June 1995	
Willi Kweksilber	10 July 1973	17 September 1978	
Jan Lamberts	20 September 1977	9 June 1981	
Raymond Leenders	10 June 2003	7 September 2003	
Frans Leijnse	4 November 2003	6 June 2011	
Piet Lieftinck	27 July 1948	10 August 1948	
Marijke Linthorst	13 June 1995	7 June 1999	
Marijke Linthorst	10 June 2003	8 June 2015	
Dirk de Loor	20 September 1955	15 September 1969	
Geertje Lycklama à Nijeholt	13 June 1995	9 June 2003	
Trude Maas-de Brouwer	8 September 1998	7 June 1999	
Trude Maas-de Brouwer	22 January 2002	11 June 2007	
Adri Maaskant	11 May 1971	12 September 1983	
Nol Maassen	29 September 1981	22 June 1987	
Ria Mastik-Sonneveldt	10 November 1981	12 September 1983	
Ria Mastik-Sonneveldt	27 January 1987	12 June 1995	
Bob Mater	11 May 1971	19 September 1977	
Jan Mazure	9 September 1958	15 September 1969	
Joke van der Meer	20 September 1977	31 March 1992	
Marian van der Meer	13 September 1983	12 June 1995	
Eibert Meester	5 June 1963	31 August 1976	
Friso Meeter	11 March 1997	7 June 1999	
Margriet Meindertsma	8 June 1999	6 June 2011	
Pauline Meurs	12 June 2007	14 January 2013	
Bert Middel	10 June 2003	11 June 2007	
Jan Mijnsbergen	10 June 1981	12 September 1983	
Jan Mijnsbergen	6 March 1990	10 June 1991	
Jan Mol	1 February 1977	9 June 1981	
Henrick Mulder	27 July 1965	19 September 1966	
Jan Nagel	20 September 1977	12 September 1983 (Note: He later served as a senator on behalf of 50PLUS.)	
Gerard Nederhorst	11 May 1971	19 September 1977	
Maarten de Niet Gerritzoon	6 November 1956	19 September 1960	
Maarten de Niet Gerritzoon	18 October 1960	19 September 1977	
Jopie Nooren	9 June 2015	30 April 2021	
Han Noten	10 June 2003	4 February 2013	
David van Ooijen	23 June 1987	8 September 1993	
Henk Oosterhuis	23 July 1946	19 September 1960	
Hans Oskamp	27 December 1978	31 December 1986	
Meine Pit	23 June 1987	10 June 1991	
Meine Pit	28 September 1993	7 June 1999	
Fré le Poole	13 June 1995	9 June 2003	
André Postema	7 June 2011	10 June 2019	
Kim Putters	10 June 2003	14 June 2013	
Arie Querido	1 July 1958	9 May 1971	
Sake van der Ploeg	5 June 1963	28 June 1965	
Fred Polak	5 June 1963	19 September 1966	
Aalje Post	20 September 1977	9 June 1981	
Cor van de Rakt	20 September 1977	15 September 1980	
Jeroen Recourt	11 June 2019	12 June 2023	
Peter Rehwinkel	12 June 2007	13 September 2009	
Marius Reinalda	23 July 1946	17 March 1947	
Liesbeth Ribbius Peletier	23 July 1946 (Note: She had been a senator on behalf of the Social Democratic Workers' Party before the July 1946 Senate election.)	15 January 1947	
Jan van der Ploeg	10 June 1981	12 December 1986	
Rudy Rabbinge	8 June 1999	11 June 2007	
Herman Redemeijer	23 June 1987	12 June 1995	
Bertus de Rijk	6 November 1956	19 September 1961	
Bertus de Rijk	13 October 1964	10 June 1991	
Ab de Roos	6 November 1956	10 September 1962	
Ivo Samkalden	20 September 1960	13 April 1965	
Willem Schermerhorn	18 September 1951	4 June 1963	
Ger Schinck	16 September 1980	12 June 1995	
Jan Nico Scholten	31 March 1998	7 June 1999	
Tjalling Schorer	6 November 1956	4 June 1963	
Nico Schrijver	7 June 2011	31 August 2017	
Esther-Mirjam Sent	7 June 2011	6 October 2021	
Jan Simons	20 September 1977	2 June 1986	
Jan Simons	23 June 1987	10 June 1991	
Mohamed Sini	6 December 2016	10 June 2019	
Mieke Smeets-Janssen	10 June 1981	12 September 1983	
Mieke Smeets-Janssen	23 June 1987	10 June 1991	
Bé Stam	10 June 1981	10 June 1991	
Eef Steenbergen	16 September 1969	31 January 1976	
Suzanne Steigenga-Kouwe	2 March 1976	12 September 1983	
Johan Stekelenburg	8 June 1999	21 September 2003	
Max van der Stoel	27 September 1960	4 June 1963	
Piet Stoffelen	3 September 1996	7 June 1999	
Nico Stufkens	23 July 1946	9 September 1947	
Saskia Stuiveling	10 June 1981	10 September 1981	
Joyce Sylvester	10 June 2003	8 June 2015	
Ing Yoe Tan	8 June 1999	6 June 2011	
Ed van Thijn	8 June 1999	11 June 2007	
Wim Thomassen	7 November 1961	9 May 1971	
Jan van Tilburg	18 September 1951	27 December 1955	
Herman Tjeenk Willink	23 June 1987	10 March 1997	
Martina Tjeenk Willink	23 July 1946	15 September 1969	
Hommo Tonkes	10 June 1981	12 September 1983	
Maurits Troostwijk	23 January 1962	31 August 1975	
Nic Tummers	17 September 1974	12 June 1995	
Rinus Tunders	13 November 1979	15 September 1980	
Frans Uijen	20 September 1977	12 September 1983	
Frans Uijen	3 June 1986	10 June 1991	
Elske ter Veld	13 June 1995	9 June 2003	
Joris in 't Veld	23 July 1946	2 March 1948	
Joris in 't Veld	28 July 1948	7 August 1948	
Joris in 't Veld	15 July 1952	31 September 1964	
Adriaan van Veldhuizen	20 September 1977	12 June 1995	
Rien Verburg	17 September 1968	31 December 1976	
Lambert Verheijen	9 June 2015	10 June 2019	
Arie Verhoef	14 May 1968	15 September 1969	
Anne Vermeer	20 September 1966	22 June 1987	
Huug Versloot	16 September 1969	9 June 1981	
Hilda Verwey-Jonker	23 November 1954	15 May 1957	
Jo Visser	5 March 1968	9 May 1971	
Leen Vleggeert	10 June 1981	12 September 1983	
Janny Vlietstra	7 June 2011	8 June 2015	
Janny Vlietstra	12 September 2017	10 June 2019	
Martha Vonk-van Kalker	20 September 1977	9 June 1981	
Irene Vorrink	16 September 1969	10 May 1973	
Hein Vos	6 November 1956	15 February 1968	
Mei Li Vos	11 June 2019	12 June 2023	
Ruud Vreeman	9 June 2015	30 November 2016	
Klaas de Vries	12 June 2007	8 June 2015	
Coen van der Waerden	25 June 1957	19 September 1966	
Coen van der Waerden	3 November 1970	9 May 1971	
Gerard van Walsum	25 August 1948	4 December 1949	
Gerard van Walsum	15 March 1950	14 July 1952	
Gerard van Walsum	29 July 1952	19 September 1955	
Mies Westerveld	10 June 2003	6 June 2011	
Floor Wibaut	6 May 1947	26 July 1948	
Floor Wibaut	19 December 1949	8 February 1950	
Floor Wibaut	4 April 1951	2 July 1956	
Floor Wibaut	31 July 1956	15 May 1958	
Hein Willemse	6 November 1956	14 August 1958	
Kees van Wingerden	6 November 1956	31 August 1968	
Agaath Witteman	10 June 2003	11 June 2007	
Willem Witteveen	8 June 1999	11 June 2007	
Willem Witteveen	15 January 2013	17 July 2014	
Dik Wolfson	8 June 1999	9 June 2003	
Thijs Wöltgens	13 June 1995	9 January 2002	
Kees Woudenberg	23 July 1946	16 October 1954	
Wouter van Zandbrink	23 September 2014	8 June 2015	
Wouter van Zandbrink	13 February 2018	10 June 2019	
Willem van de Zandschulp	16 September 1980	7 June 1999	
Nancy Zeelenberg	20 September 1960	9 February 1967	
Kees Zijlstra	11 June 1991	7 June 1999	
Jan Zoon	16 September 1969	10 June 1991	
