= List of members of the Senate of the Netherlands, 1995–1999 =

Senate, 1995–1999
←	1991–1995	1999–2003	→

Overview
- Legislative body: Senate
- Meeting place: Binnenhof
- Term: 13 June 1995 – 7 June 1999
- Election: 1995
- Members: 75
- President of the Senate: Herman Tjeenk Willink; Frits Korthals Altes

Between 13 June 1995 and 7 June 1999, 82 individuals served as representatives in the Senate, the 75-seat upper house of the States-General of the Netherlands. 75 representatives were elected in the 29 May 1995 Senate election and installed at the start of the term; 7 representatives were appointed as replacements when elected representatives resigned or went on leave.

During this period, the first and second Kok cabinets reigned. The former coalition consisted of the Labour Party (PvdA, 14 seats), People's Party for Freedom and Democracy (VVD, 23 seats), and Democrats 66 (D66, 7 seats). The opposition was composed of the Christian Democratic Appeal (CDA, 19 seats), GroenLinks (GL, 4 seats), Reformed Political Party (SGP, 2 seats), General Elderly Alliance (AOV, 2 seats), Reformed Political League (GPV, 1 seat), Reformatory Political Federation (RPF, 1 seat), independents (1 seat), and Socialist Party (SP, 1 seat).

== Members ==
All members are sworn in at the start of the term, even if they are not new. Assumed office in this list therefore refers to the swearing in during this term (or return date of members who left), while all members are automatically considered to have left office at the end of the term.

Members of the Senate of the Netherlands, 1995–1999
Name	Parliamentary group	Assumed office	Left office	Ref.
Gijs van Aardenne	VVD	13 June 1995	10 August 1995 (Note: Died in office)	
Joeke Baarda	CDA	13 June 1995	7 June 1999	
Martin Batenburg	AOV (Note: Until 7 April 1998)	13 June 1995	7 June 1999	
Martin Batenburg	Batenburg (Note: Starting 7 April 1998)	13 June 1995	7 June 1999	
Pol de Beer	VVD	5 September 1995	7 June 1999	
Gert van den Berg	SGP	13 June 1995	7 June 1999	
Joop van den Berg	PvdA	13 June 1995	31 July 1996 (Note: Left to become general director of the Association of Netherlands Municipalities)	
Marten Bierman	Bierman	13 June 1995	7 June 1999	
Wim de Boer	GL	13 June 1995	7 June 1999	
Peter Boorsma	CDA	13 June 1995	7 June 1999	
Gerrit Braks	CDA	13 June 1995	7 June 1999	
Nicoline van den Broek-Laman Trip	VVD	13 June 1995	7 June 1999	
Job Cohen	PvdA	13 June 1995	3 August 1998 (Note: Left to join the second Kok cabinet)	
Dick Dees	VVD	13 June 1995	7 June 1999	
Kees van Dijk	CDA	13 June 1995	7 June 1999	
Wim van Eekelen	VVD	13 June 1995	7 June 1999	
Huib Eversdijk	CDA	13 June 1995	7 June 1999	
Hanneke Gelderblom-Lankhout	D66	13 June 1995	7 June 1999	
Jos van Gennip	CDA	13 June 1995	7 June 1999	
Leendert Ginjaar	VVD	13 June 1995	7 June 1999	
Jan Glastra van Loon	D66	13 June 1995	7 June 1999	
Jaap Glasz	CDA	13 June 1995	7 June 1999	
John van Graafeiland	VVD	13 June 1995	7 June 1999	
Annemarie Grewel	PvdA	13 June 1995	27 February 1998	
Toos Grol-Overling	CDA	13 June 1995	7 June 1999	
Robert de Haze Winkelman	VVD	13 June 1995	7 June 1999	
Han Heijmans	VVD	13 June 1995	7 June 1999	
Henk Heijne Makkreel	VVD	13 June 1995	7 June 1999	
Jan Hendriks	AOV (Note: Until 12 September 1995)	13 June 1995	7 June 1999	
Jan Hendriks	Hendriks (Note: Between 12 September 1995 and 16 June 1998)	13 June 1995	7 June 1999	
Jan Hendriks	CDA (Note: Starting 16 June 1998)	13 June 1995	7 June 1999	
Ruud Hessing	D66	13 June 1995	7 June 1999	
Jan van Heukelum	VVD	13 June 1995	7 June 1999	
Lammert Hilarides	VVD	13 June 1995	7 June 1999	
Ernst Hirsch Ballin	CDA	13 June 1995	7 June 1999	
Henk Hofstede	CDA	13 June 1995	7 June 1999	
Gerrit Holdijk	SGP	13 June 1995	7 June 1999	
Ria Jaarsma	PvdA	13 June 1995	7 June 1999	
Ad de Jager	VVD	13 June 1995	7 June 1999	
Erik Jurgens	PvdA	13 June 1995	7 June 1999	
Niek Ketting	VVD	13 June 1995	7 June 1999	
Frits Korthals Altes	VVD	13 June 1995	7 June 1999	
Hannie van Leeuwen	CDA	13 June 1995	7 June 1999	
Luck van Leeuwen	CDA	13 June 1995	7 June 1999	
Marijke Linthorst	PvdA	13 June 1995	7 June 1999	
Michel Lodewijks	VVD	13 June 1995	7 June 1999	
Aarnout Loudon	VVD	13 June 1995	7 June 1999	
Paul Luijten	VVD	13 June 1995	7 June 1999	
Minny Luimstra-Albeda	CDA	13 June 1995	7 June 1999	
Geertje Lycklama à Nijeholt	PvdA	13 June 1995	7 June 1999	
Trude Maas-de Brouwer	PvdA	8 September 1998	7 June 1999	
Friso Meeter	PvdA	11 March 1997	7 June 1999	
Irene Michiels van Kessenich-Hoogendam	CDA	13 June 1995	7 June 1999	
Meine Pit	PvdA	13 June 1995	7 June 1999	
Tom Pitstra	GL	13 June 1995	7 June 1999	
Fré le Poole	PvdA	13 June 1995	7 June 1999	
Andries Postma	CDA	13 June 1995	7 June 1999	
Jaap Rensema	VVD	13 June 1995	7 June 1999	
Eef Rongen	CDA	13 June 1995	7 June 1999	
Fransje Roscam Abbing-Bos	VVD	13 June 1995	7 June 1999	
Bob Ruers	SP	19 May 1998	7 June 1999	
Jan Nico Scholten	PvdA	31 March 1998	7 June 1999	
Cobi Schoondergang-Horikx	GL	13 June 1995	7 June 1999	
Egbert Schuurman	RPF	13 June 1995	7 June 1999	
Eddy Schuyer	D66	13 June 1995	7 June 1999	
Boele Staal	D66	13 June 1995	31 December 1997 (Note: Left to become Queen's Commissioner of Utrecht)	
Piet Steenkamp	CDA	13 June 1995	7 June 1999	
Willem Stevens	CDA	13 June 1995	7 June 1999	
Piet Stoffelen	PvdA	3 September 1996	7 June 1999	
Henk Talsma	VVD	13 June 1995	7 June 1999	
Marie-Louise Tiesinga-Autsema	D66	27 February 1998	7 June 1999	
Herman Tjeenk Willink	PvdA	13 June 1995	10 March 1997 (Note: Left to become Vice-President of the Council of State)	
Elida Tuinstra	D66	13 June 1995	7 June 1999	
Marius Varekamp	VVD	13 June 1995	7 June 1999	
Else ter Veld	PvdA	13 June 1995	7 June 1999	
Kars Veling	GPV	13 June 1995	7 June 1999	
Jan Verbeek	VVD	13 June 1995	7 June 1999	
Adrienne Vrisekoop	D66	13 June 1995	7 June 1999	
Jos Werner	CDA	13 June 1995	7 June 1999	
Hans Wiegel	VVD	13 June 1995	7 June 1999	
Jan de Wit	SP	13 June 1995	18 May 1998	
Thijs Wöltgens	PvdA	13 June 1995	7 June 1999	
Willem van de Zandschulp	PvdA	13 June 1995	7 June 1999	
Kees Zijlstra	PvdA	13 June 1995	7 June 1999	
Ans Zwerver	GL	13 June 1995	7 June 1999	
