= International Institute of Social Studies =

Educational institute in the Netherlands

- Type: Public
- Established: 1952; 74 years ago
- Affiliations: Ceres The Hague Academic Coalition EADI, the European Association of Development Research and Training Institutes
- Endowment: €24.5 million
- Rector: Professor Ruard Ganzevoort
- Faculty: 145
- Students: 280
- Postgraduates: 185
- Location: The Hague, Netherlands; 52.0840°N 4.3032°E
Colours
Black and Red
- Website: http://www.iss.nl/

The International Institute of Social Studies (ISS) of Erasmus University Rotterdam is an independent international graduate school of policy-oriented social science. ISS was established in 1952 by Dutch universities and the Netherlands Ministry of Education. The ISS is located in The Hague, Netherlands.

Between 300 and 400 students are enrolled in the ISS programmes, mostly in the Master and PhD programme in Development Studies. The students come from over 150 countries.

In addition to its educational work and research, ISS is active in advisory work and institutional capacity building projects.

== History ==
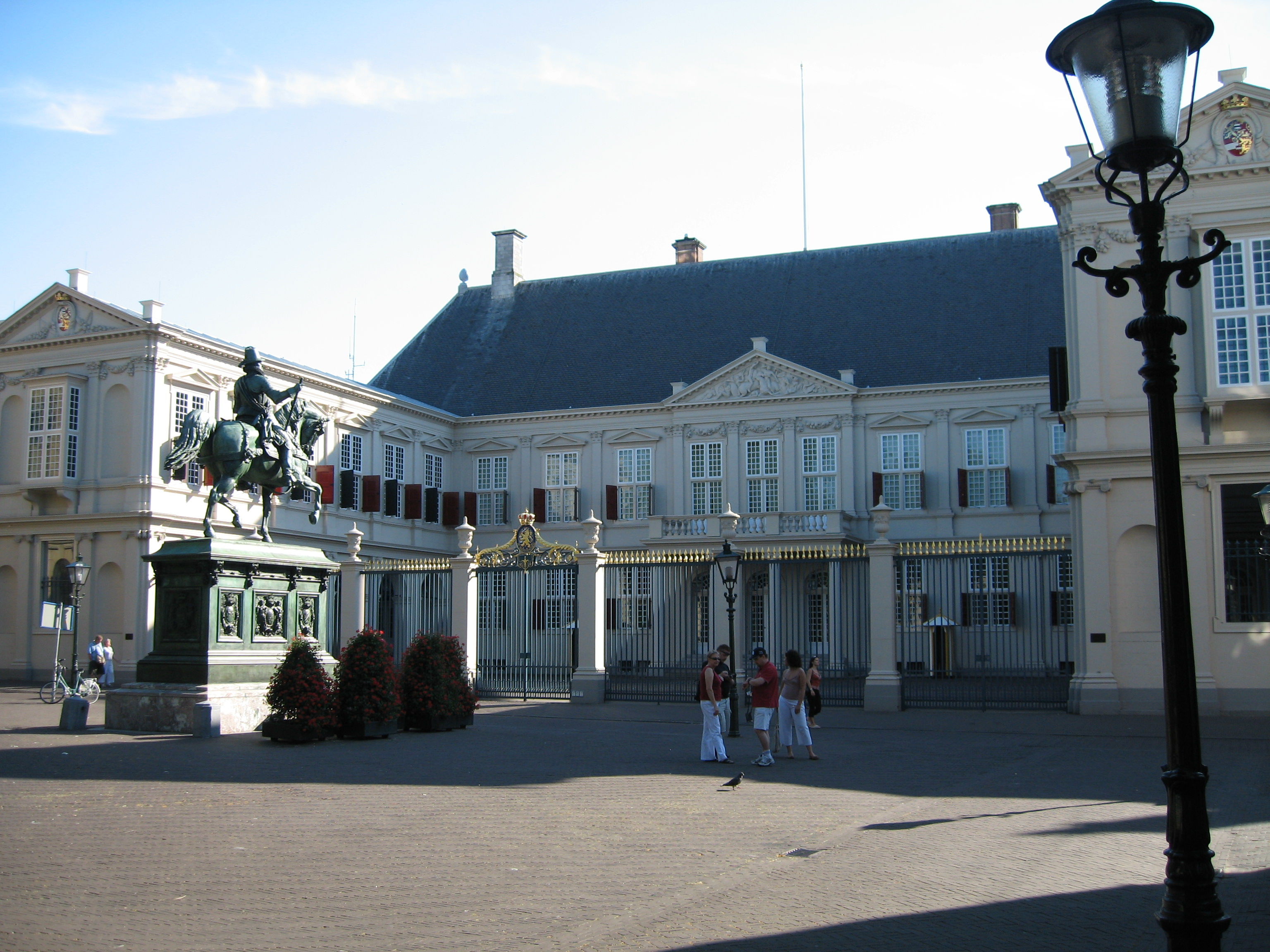
Noordeinde Palace in The Hague, the Institutes first location

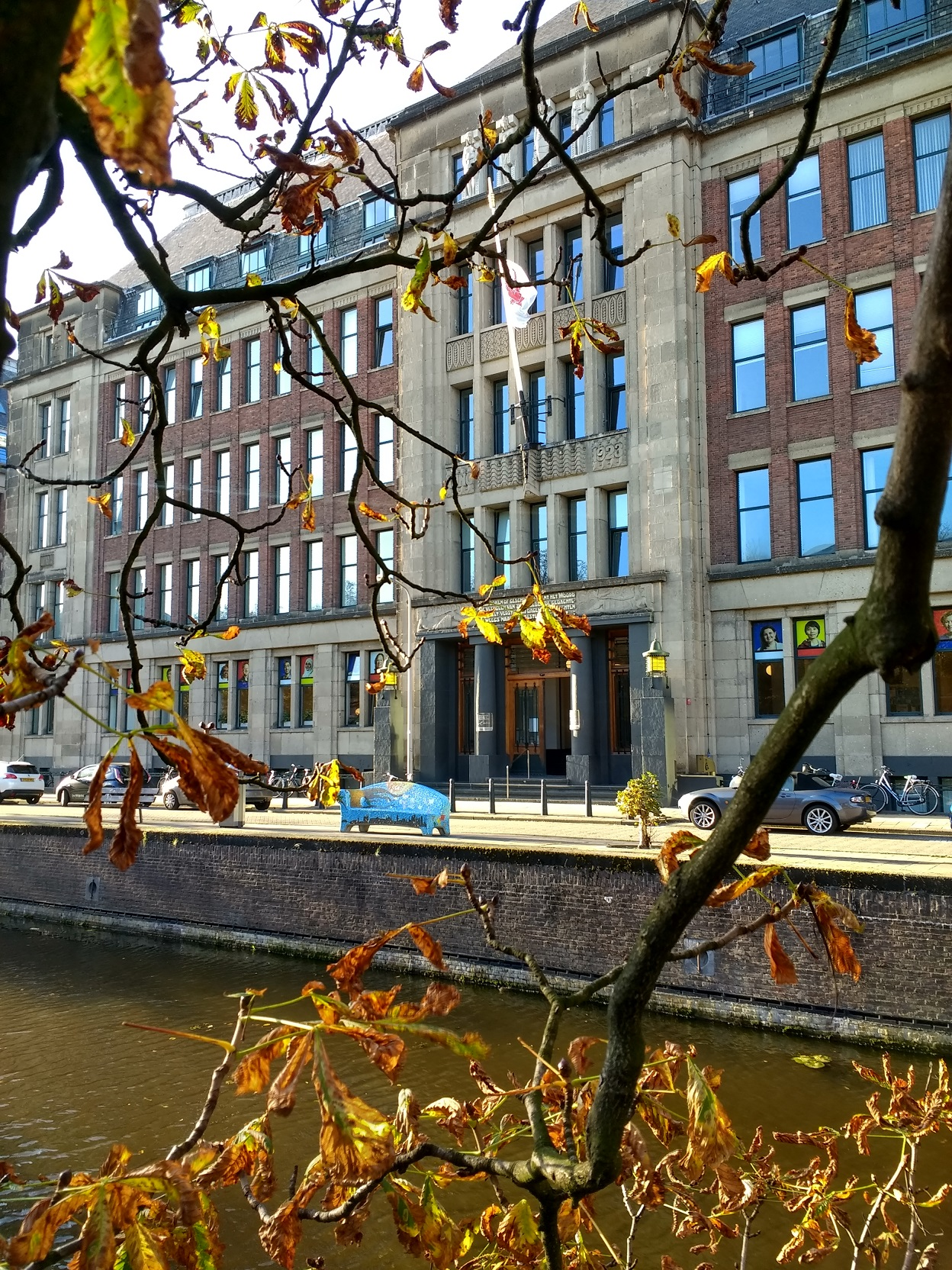
The current location of ISS in The Hague, Kortenaerkade

ISS was founded in 1952 by the Dutch government to assist in the training and further education of professionals, especially, but not only, from developing countries. This was one way in which the Netherlands sought to develop good relationships with intellectuals and policy makers in partner countries, including and beyond former Dutch colonies.

Queen Juliana offered to house ISS in the Noordeinde Palace in The Hague in 1951. At first, ISS was perceived as a teaching institute, although by 1954 ISS was aiming to become research and teaching driven. Due to the role ISS played in creating the European Association of Development Institutes (EADI), and its focus on research and academic quality, the Institute received its formal rights to award the PhD in the 1970s. From 1993 onward, the ISS has been located in the former headquarters of the Netherlands Post and Telecommunications (the PTT) on the Kortenaerkade.

In 2009 ISS became part of Erasmus University Rotterdam. The partnership was carefully negotiated, due to ISS wanting to remain fairly autonomous and to retain its mission.

For many years, the main funding body for ISS Masters students was the Dutch government, through the OKP programme (formerly the NFP programme) administered by the Nuffic in cooperation with Dutch Embassies. The OKP programme is currently under review by the Dutch government.

== Academic profile ==
=== Programmes and degrees ===
ISS provides education in the social sciences to postgraduate professionals, mostly from developing countries and countries in transition. The courses are all taught in English and cover a number of fields, including development economics, migration, public policy, governance, gender, agriculture, food, population, social security, children and youth, and human rights.

==== Doctoral programme ====
The institute offers a four-year Doctoral programme which leads to a degree of Doctor of Philosophy in Development Studies. PhD researchers are embedded into the research programmes at ISS, and are usually involved in one of four research groups: Civic Innovation, Development Economics, Political Ecology or Governance, Law and Social Justice. Currently there are about 125 enrolled PhD researchers and ISS has awarded over 250 PhD degrees since the programme was established. Within the Netherlands, ISS participates in the national doctoral research school CERES, and within Erasmus University in the Erasmus Graduate School of Social Sciences and the Humanities.

==== Master programmes ====
ISS offers a 12-month Master in Development Studies and various postgraduate diploma programmes; there is also a two-year joint master's degree in Public Policy which requires students to study at ISS or at the Central European University in the first academic year, and at the University of York or the Institute on International Relations in Barcelona (IBEI) in the second year.

The ISS Master's degree in Development Studies is accredited by the Netherlands Flemish accreditation organisation NVAO and provides eligibility for entry to PhD programmes in the Netherlands and other countries. In 2010 the ISS Master programme received the 'internationalization as a distinctive quality feature' accreditation from the NVAO.

ISS also offers various joint programmes with academic partners. In some programmes students take part of the programme elsewhere and part of the programme at ISS in The Hague. In other programmes ISS staff travel to the partner institute for contribute to teaching. Postgraduate diploma programmes are also offered catering to the needs of young and mid-career professionals who wish to deepen their knowledge in a particular field related to their research or occupation. All degrees are recognized internationally and by Dutch legislation on higher education.

=== Research and publications ===
ISS research is clustered in the research programme Global Development and Social Justice. Much of the research carried out in the institute is available through publications online, either as journal articles or in the ISS Working Papers.

The ISS Working Paper series consists mainly of work in progress; the best, award-winning dissertations by Masters students are also published in this way. As well as seminars by staff and PhD participants, visiting researchers and invited experts come to speak at ISS on a regular basis. The wider diplomatic and academic community is often invited to major debates and other events.

ISS also publishes the bi-annual journal, DevISSues. The journal promotes the International Institute of Social Studies as a leading centre for Development Studies. It does so by publicizing 'state of the art' high quality information about research and teaching at ISS and by stimulating debate on key and emerging development policy issues.

=== Library ===
ISS has a specialised library available for the use of ISS staff and students and for visitors. The library focuses on the social sciences (development studies) with a predominant emphasis on developing countries and countries in transition. The collection comprises approximately 100,000 books, 450 current subscriptions to journals, a reference collection, as well as on-line and CD-ROM databases. The library also has a substantial collection of report material, much of it "grey" literature.

=== Rectors ===
Since its foundation the institute has had twelve rectors.

- Egbert de Vries (1956–1966)
- Jan Glastra van Loon (1966–1973)
- Chris van Nieuwenhuyze (1973–1975)
- Jos Hilhorst (1975–1976)
- Louis Emmerij (1976–1985)
- Charles Cooper (1985)
- Dik Wolfson (1986–1990)
- Geertje Lycklama à Nijeholt (1990–1995)
- Henk van Roosmalen (1995)
- Hans Opschoor (1996–2004)
- Louk de la Rive Box (2005–2010)
- Leo de Haan (2010–2015)
- Inge Hutter (2015–2023)
- Ruard Ganzevoort (since 2023)

== ISS Alumni ==
Over 13,000 students from more than 160 countries have studied at ISS. These former students create the international ISS alumni community.

=== Notable alumni ===
- Raqiya Haji Dualeh Abdalla
- Marietta Brew Appiah-Oppong
- Tarik Ahsan
- David Francis
- Zoran Jolevski
- Ashok Mitra
- Kasit Piromya
- Rafael Pardo Rueda
- Ramji Raghavan
- Gertrude Tokornoo
- Samuel Kofi Woods
- Immaculate Wambua
- Teferra Wolde-Semait
- Roodal Moonilal
- Satish Jha
- Chua Tian Chang

== Notable honorary Fellows ==
- Dattatreya Gopal Karve 1962
- Peter Kuenstler 1962
- Oskar Lange 1962
- Eugen Pusić 1962
- Paul Rosenstein-Rodan 1962
- Jan Tinbergen 1962
- Hans Singer 1977
- Raúl Prebisch 1977
- Manfred Lachs 1982
- Amartya Sen 1982

- Rodolfo Stavenhagen 1982
- Prince Claus of the Netherlands 1988
- Subrata Roy Chowdhury 1992
- Hans Linneman 1992
- Benno Ndulu 1997
- Mamphela Ramphele 1997
- Jan Pronk 2002
- Elinor Ostrom 2002
- Edward Said 2002
- Martha Nussbaum 2006
- Richard Jolly 2007
- Bina Agarwal 2007
- Jan Breman 2009
- Robert Chambers 2013
