= Association for Studies in International Education =

International educational organization

The Association for Studies in International Education (ASIE) is a group of organizations whose stated mission is to encourage serious research and publications dealing with international education and academic mobility, to stimulate interest in such work, and to develop and promote ways to disseminate this work in cost-effective and accessible formats. The initial objective and primary focus of ASIE in fulfillment of this mission is the publication and distribution of the Journal of Studies in International Education (JSIE).

The Journal of Studies in International Education (JSIE) is published by Nuffic on behalf of the association.
