= Dik Wolfson =

Dutch economist and politician (1933–2025)

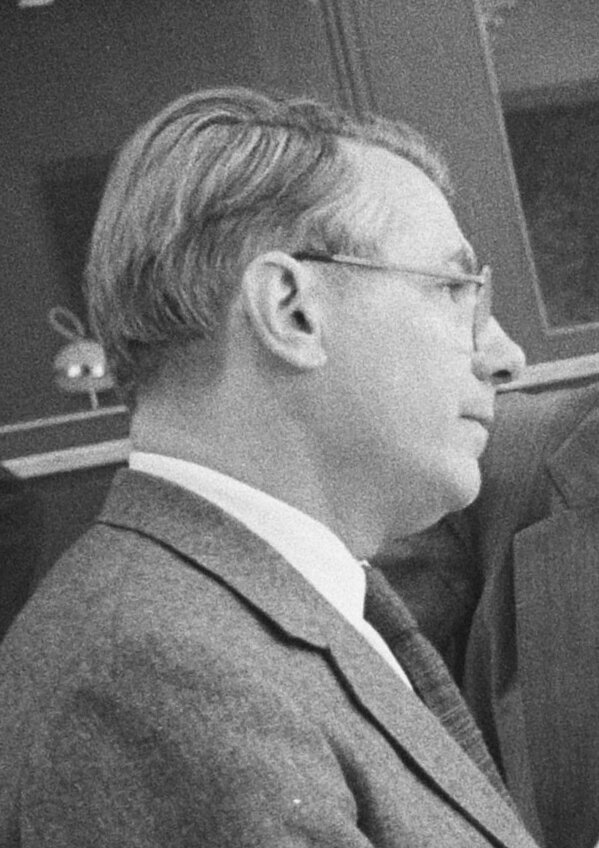
- Wolfson in 1984

Member of the Senate
- In office 8 June 1999 – 10 June 2003

Member of the Scientific Council for Government Policy
- In office 1 April 1990 – 1998

Rector of the International Institute of Social Studies
- In office 1986–1990
- Succeeded by: Geertje Lycklama à Nijeholt

Personal details
- Born: Dirk Jacob Wolfson; 22 June 1933; Voorburg, Netherlands
- Died: 16 March 2025 (aged 91)
- Political party: Labour Party
- Occupation: Economist, civil servant, politician

Dirk Jacob "Dik" Wolfson (22 June 1933 – 16 March 2025) was a Dutch economist, civil servant and politician who worked at the International Monetary Fund and the Dutch Ministry of Finance. Academically, Wolfson also served two stints as professor at the Erasmus University Rotterdam (1975–1986 and 1993–1998) and was rector of the International Institute of Social Studies from 1986 to 1990. Wolfson was an influential member of the Scientific Council for Government Policy and the Social and Economic Council in the 1990s on which he served eight and 14 years respectively. He was a member of the Senate of the Netherlands for the Labour Party between 1999 and 2003.

== Early life ==
Wolfson was born on 22 June 1933 in Voorburg. His father was a minister. His mother died in January 1945, when he was 11 years old. Wolfson grew up in Westerlee, Groningen. Wolfson obtained his PhD with a thesis on public finance in developing countries.

== Career ==
Wolfson started his career at the International Monetary Fund (IMF) in Washington. During his time at the IMF, he became acquainted with Labour Party member Wim Duisenberg. In the 1960s, he worked as the IMF's permanent representative in Liberia. Between 1970 and 1973, he was deputy director of domestic money affairs of the Ministry of Finance of the Netherlands. He then served as director of economic policy between 1973 and 1975. In 1973, Wim Duisenberg, as finance minister, wanted to send a 100-guilder cheque to every citizen; Wolfson, as one of his financial aides, rejected the plan as too costly. From 1975 to 1986, Wolfson was professor of public finance at Erasmus University Rotterdam. In 1986, Wolfson became rector of the International Institute of Social Studies (ISS) in the Hague. He was elected a member of the Royal Netherlands Academy of Arts and Sciences in 1989. He served as rector of ISS until 1990 as hearing problems forced him to give up the position and he was succeeded by Geertje Lycklama à Nijeholt.

From 1 April 1990 until 1998, he was a member of the Scientific Council for Government Policy (WRR). Wolfson was also crown member at the Social and Economic Council (SER) for a total of 14 years. In 1985, he argued in the SER for an enlarged employment-to-population ratio, but first had to explain the concept to the others. In 1991, he advised on sobering the Wet op de arbeidsongeschiktheidsverzekering. The advice was based on the work of the troika consisting of Wolfson, Gerrit Zalm and Ad Kolnaar. In early 1994, he and Zalm were influential in the lead up to the formation of Wim Kok's first cabinet. Both men argued for reforms of the organisation of social security. As members of the WRR, they were in a position to provide unsolicited advice to the government. In May 1994, a group under Wolfson published a report which argued for limited market mechanism in social security and privatization of the implementing organizations. The parties discussing the formation with Kok used the report and it became an essential source for the government program. Wolfson also returned to the Erasmus University Rotterdam as a part-time professor of economics between 1993 and 1998.

Wolfson in 2003 pleaded for a "transaction state", as opposed to a primarily caring welfare state. In 2005 he concluded that cultural factors were making it hard to reach the desired state.

== Political career ==
In 1991, discussion was ongoing within the Labour Party, of which Wolfson was a member, regarding the cabinet plans of budget cuts to social security. When Wolfson was asked to explain the plans to party members in De Rode Hoed, he faced a critical audience and delivered a fire-and-brimstone sermon. As member of the Labour Party he was part of its economic think tank and led a party commission on the welfare state. The report which followed in 1992 was largely the same as the 1991 SER publication, which was exactly as Wolfson had intended.

Wolfson was a member of the Senate of the Netherlands for the Labour Party between 8 June 1999 and 10 June 2003. In the Senate he dealt with financial and social affairs, defence, higher education and transport and water management.

According to Wolfson himself, for over 15 years, he struggled with Jan Blokker's concept: am I left enough?

== Death ==
Wolfson died on 16 March 2025, aged 91.
