= Clovis Cnoop Koopmans =

Dutch politician and judge (1925–2008)

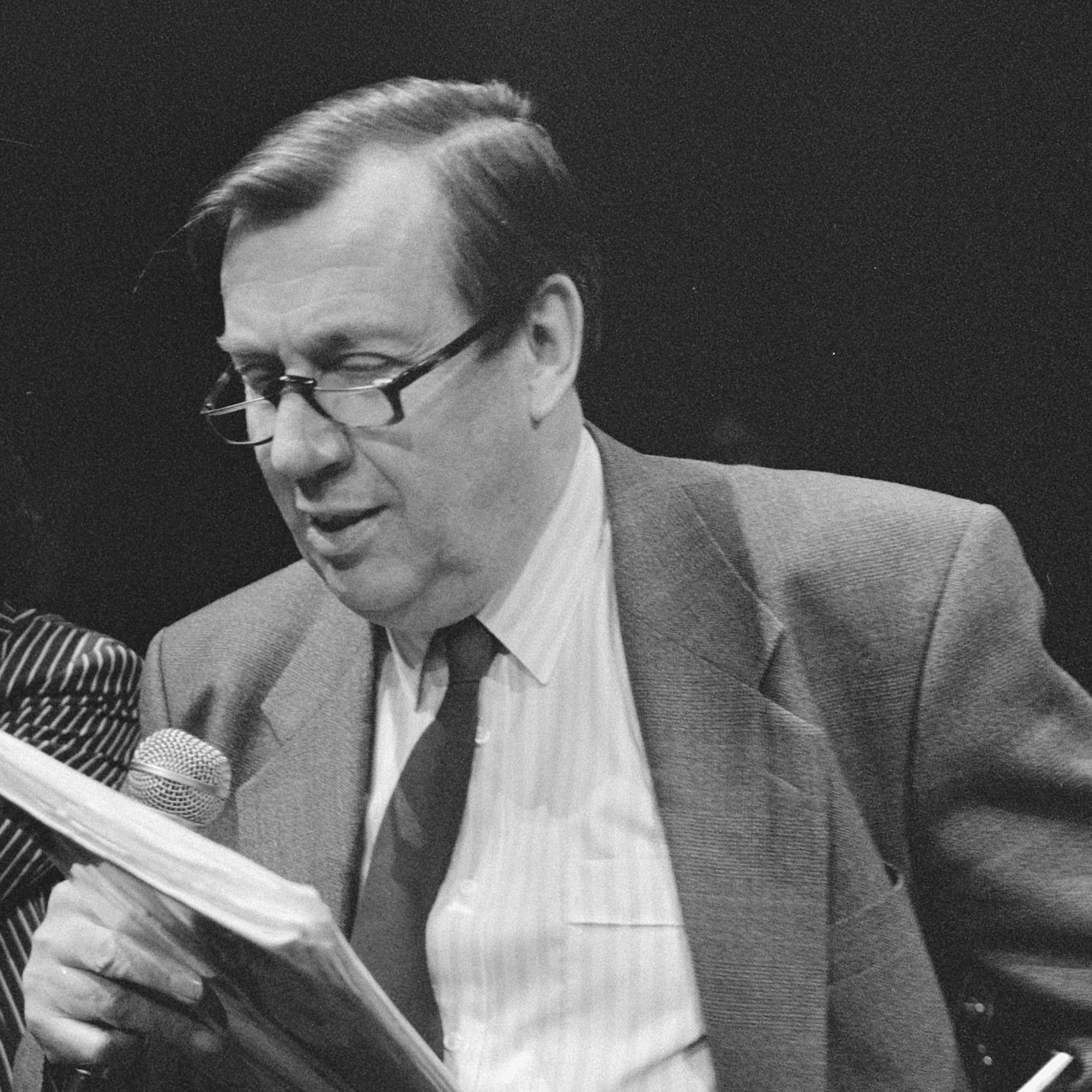
- Cnoop Koopmans in 1988

Member of the Senate
- In office 10 November 1981 – 14 August 1982
- Preceded by: Hedy d'Ancona
- Succeeded by: Hedy d'Ancona

Member of the Amsterdam Municipal Council
- In office 7 September 1982 – 30 April 1990

Personal details
- Born: Abraham Jakob Cnoop Koopmans; 28 February 1925 Amsterdam, Netherlands
- Died: 25 March 2008 (aged 83) Amsterdam, Netherlands
- Party: Labour
- Spouse: Martha Bruyn (m. 1955; died 2006)
- Relatives: Gijsbert van Tienhoven (great-grandfather)
- Education: University of Amsterdam
- Occupation: Judge; politician

Abraham Jakob "Clovis" Cnoop Koopmans (Dutch: [ˈkloːvɪs ˈknoːp ˈkoːpmɑns]; 28 February 1925 – 25 March 2008) was a Dutch judge and politician of the Labour Party.

== Early life and legal career ==
Cnoop Koopmans was born in Amsterdam on 28 February 1925 to Daisy van Tienhoven and Wilhelm Cnoop Koopmans, an ambassador and secretary of the Amsterdam Stock Exchange Association. His family is registered in the Nederland's Patriciaat, and his great-grandfather was Prime Minister Gijsbert van Tienhoven. Cnoop Koopmans has two younger siblings, and he attended the Montessori Lyceum Amsterdam, graduating with a gymnasium diploma in 1943. He studied Dutch law at the University of Amsterdam from 1945 until 1952, and he served as the rector of the Amsterdam Student Corps. He was known as "Bram" until his initiation, when he was given the name "Clovis" as another member of his group was already named Bram. He protested against Dutch resistance against the Indonesian National Revolution.

Following his studies, Cnoop Koopmans was group leader at an Amersfoort youth home for a year before working as a child protection officer and social worker. He became assistant secretary of the Council for Child Protection in 1960. He started to work at the Amsterdam District Court in 1963 as a deputy clerk, and he became a substitute judge two years later. He was appointed judge of the district court in November 1966, and he was its vice president starting in May 1977. When he left the role in April 1987, he continued to serve as a substitute judge for three years. Cnoop Koopmans was specialised in juvenile cases.

== Politics ==
A member of the Labour Party, he participated in the 1980 and 1981 Senate elections. When Hedy d'Ancona stepped down as senator, Cnoop Koopmans was sworn into the body on 10 November 1981, and his portfolio included justice and higher education. It had become exceptional for a sitting judge to serve in the Senate in line with the separation of powers, but Cnoop Koopmans argued in a periodical that judges should become more politically involved. He believed that the judicial system should be a better reflection of society and its different political ideologies. A nuclear pacifist, he voted against the budget of the Ministry of Defence, and he was one of four members of his parliamentary group to oppose a revision of the University Education Act.

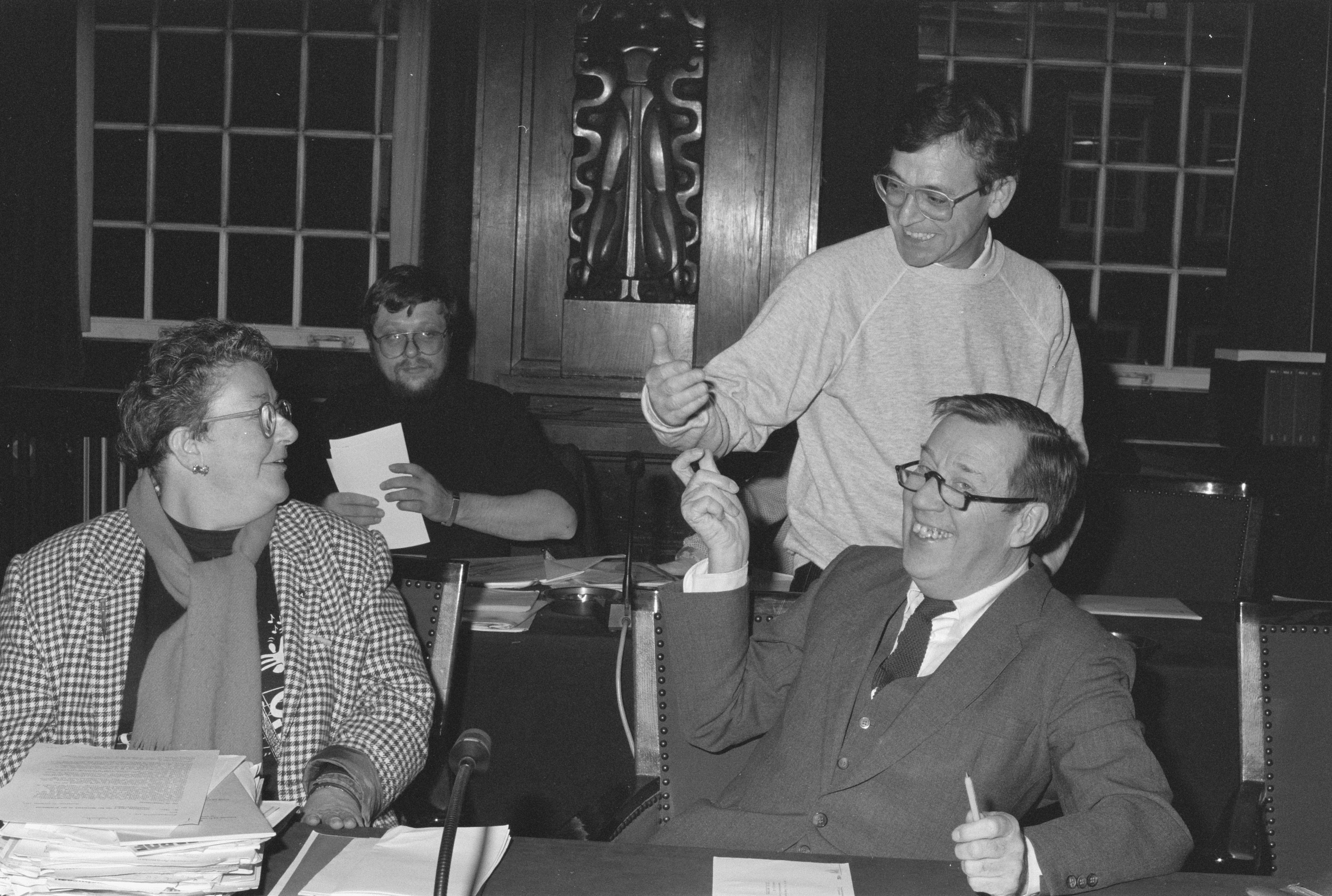
Cnoop Koopmans (bottom right) with fellow councillors Annemarie Grewel and Pelle Mug in 1987

He ran for the Amsterdam Municipal Council in 1982, and he was elected as his party's 15th candidate. Cnoop Koopmans stepped down from the Senate on 14 August of that year, and he called the body "a fossilised institution". He secured a second term as councillor in 1986. He managed to prevent the closure of De Kleine Komedie theatre by breaking with the party line, and he called for a hunting ban in the Amsterdamse Waterleidingduinen, which was later implemented. Cnoop Koopmans was in favour of legalising soft drugs. His membership of the council ended in April 1990, but he continued to speak out against the construction of the IJburg district and the formation of the borough of Amsterdam-Centrum.

He chaired the Labour Party's internal appeals committee until 2004.

== Personal life and death ==
He lived along Amsteldijk in Amsterdam since his student days, in a house where artist Melle Oldeboerrigter had his studio. Cnoop Koopmans married his housemate and Oldeboerriger's former lover, dancer Martha Bruyn, in Amsterdam on 1 July 1955. They continued to live in the house. He was a vegetarian and a bird enthusiast, serving on the boards of Vereniging Natuurmonumenten (1978–1986), Landschap Noord-Holland, and Goois Natuurreservaat.

Cnoop Koopmans died on 25 March 2008 in Amsterdam at the age of 83.

== Electoral history ==
Electoral history of Clovis Cnoop Koopmans
Year	Body	Party	Pos.	Votes	Result		Ref.
Year	Body	Party	Pos.	Votes	Party seats	Individual	Ref.
1980	Senate	Labour Party	(Note: Cnoop Koopmans participated in electoral group III (North Holland and Friesland).)		26 / 75	Lost	
1981	Senate	Labour Party			28 / 75	Lost (Note: Cnoop Koopmans was appointed to the body later during the term due to a vacancy.)	
1982	Amsterdam Municipal Council	Labour Party	15	117	19 / 45	Won	
1986	Amsterdam Municipal Council	Labour Party	9	2,188	21 / 45	Won	
1990	Amsterdam Municipal Council	Labour Party	39 (Note: Cnoop Koopmans participated as lijstduwer.)	562	12 / 45	Lost	
