= Meerswal =

Smock mill in the Netherlands

Meerswal, Lollum
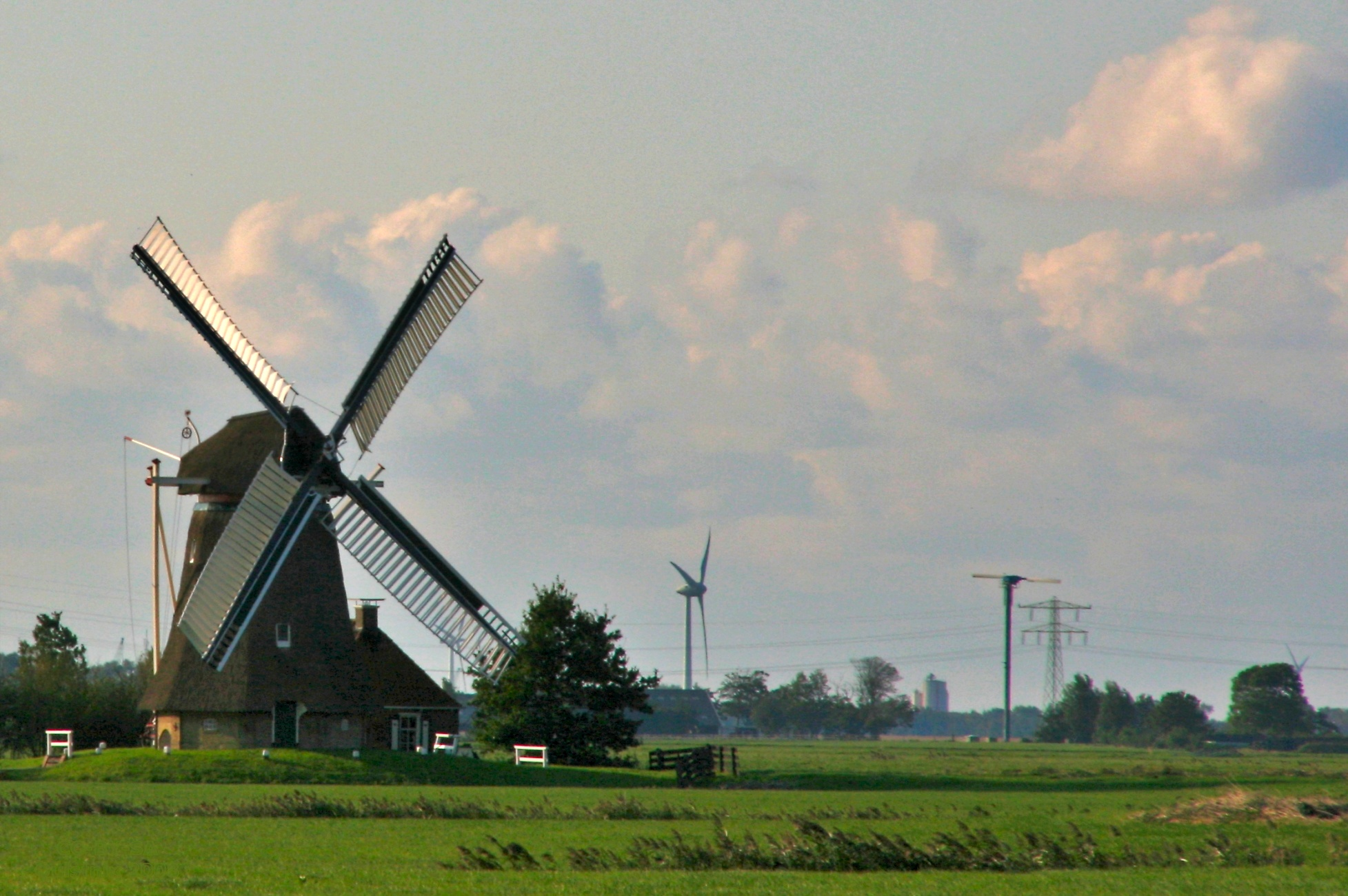
- Meerswal, September 2008.

Origin
- Mill name: Meerswal
- Mill location: Berghuizwerweg 1, 8823 SB Lollum
- Coordinates: 53.1358°N 5.525°E
- Operator(s): Stichting De Fryske Mole
- Year built: 1903

Information
- Purpose: Drainage mill
- Type: Smock mill
- Storeys: Three-storey smock
- Base storeys: Single-storey base
- No. of sails: Four sails
- Type of sails: Patent sails
- Windshaft: Cast iron
- Winding: Tailpole and winch
- Auxiliary power: Battery powered electric motor
- Type of pump: Archimedes' screw

Meerswal is a smock mill in Lollum, Friesland, Netherlands which was built in 1903. The mill has been restored to working order and held is reserve for use in times of emergency. It is listed as a Rijksmonument, number 39364.

== History ==
The first mill on this site was built in 1818. It burnt down in 1902. Meerswal was built in 1903. It drained the Rûgelollum polder, which covers 1,570 hectares (3,900 acres). On 3 November 1970, the sails and windshaft were blown out of the mill in a storm. A 24V electric motor powered by batteries was installed in the mill to drive the Archimedes' screw. On 21 June 1977, the mill was sold to Stichting De Fryske Mole (English: Frisian Mills Foundation). Meerswal was restored in 1978-79 by millwright Westra of Franeker. At that time, Common sails were fitted. The mill was refitted with Patent sails at a later date. In 1994, millwright Hiemstra of Tzummarum replaced the Archimedes' screw and restored the watercourses. In 2006, the mill was officially listed by Wetterskip Fryslân as being held in reserve for use in times of emergency.

== Description ==
Meerswal is what the Dutch describe as a Grondzeiler. It is a three-storey smock mill on a single-storey base. There is no stage, the sails reaching almost to ground level. The mill is winded by tailpole and winch. The smock and cap are thatched. The sails are Patent sails. They have a span of 22.00 metres (72 ft 2 in). The sails are carried on a cast-iron windshaft. which was cast by Prins van Oranje, The Hague, South Holland in 1892. This was originally installed in the saw mill De Haan (English: The Rooster), Franeker. It was fitted to Meerswal after De Haan was dismantled in 1912. The windshaft also carries the brake wheel which has 57 cogs. This drives the wallower (29 cogs) at the top of the upright shaft. At the bottom of the upright shaft the crown wheel, which has 42 cogs drives a gearwheel with 37 cogs on the axle of the Archimedes' screw. A spur wheel with 63 cogs on the upright shaft is driven by a lantern pinion with 19 staves which receives the belt drive from the battery driven electric motor. The axle of the Archimedes' screw is 490 millimetres (1 ft 7 in) diameter. The screw is 1.68 metres (5 ft 6 in) diameter. It is inclined at 22½°. Each revolution of the screw lifts 1,255 litres (276 imp gal) of water.

== Public access ==
Meerswal is normally open to the public on a Saturday. The mill is also open by appointment.
