= Journal of Studies in International Education =

- Discipline: Education
- Language: English
- Edited by: Betty Leask, Laura E. Rumbley

Publication details
- History: 1997-present
- Publisher: SAGE Publications on behalf of the Association for Studies in International Education (United States)
- Frequency: Quarterly
- Impact factor: 2.255 (2017)

Standard abbreviations
- ISO 4: J. Stud. Int. Educ.

Indexing
- ISSN: 1028-3153 (print); 1552-7808 (web)
- LCCN: 97657707
- OCLC no.: 663324762

Links
- Journal homepage; Online access; Online archive

The Journal of Studies in International Education is a quarterly peer-reviewed academic journal that covers the field of education. The journal's editors are Betty Leask (Boston College and La Trobe University) and Laura E. Rumbley (European Association for International Education). It was established in 1997 and is published by SAGE Publications on behalf of the Association for Studies in International Education.

== Abstracting and indexing ==
The journal is abstracted and indexed in Scopus, Clarivate Analytics, ProQuest databases, Journal Citation Reports, ERIC, EBSCO Databases, and the Social Sciences Citation Index. According to the Journal Citation Reports, its 2017 impact factor is 2.255, ranking it 43rd out of 238 journals in the category "Education & Educational Research".
