= Montessori Lyceum Amsterdam =

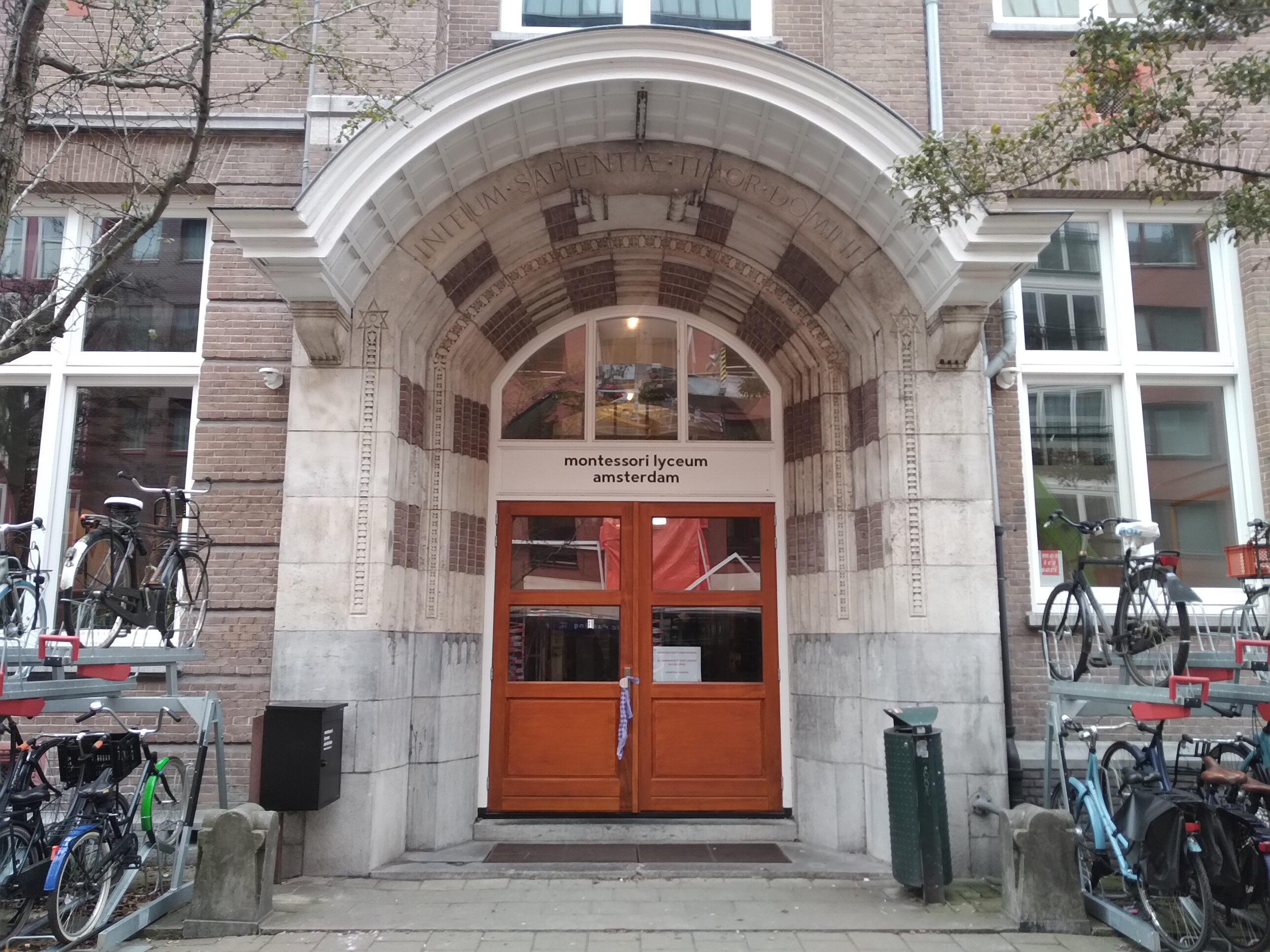
- Entrance N. Maesstraat 1 (november 2021)

Location
- Pieter de Hoochstraat 59; 1071 ED Amsterdam; Netherlands
- Coordinates: 52.355055°N 4.885515°E

Information
- Founded: 1930
- Head of school: Wrister Grommers
- Slogan: "More than education alone"
- Song: The Little Pioneer
- Affiliation: Montessori Comprehensive School Amsterdam Foundation
- Website: Montessori Lyceum Amsterdam

The Montessori Lyceum Amsterdam, shortly MLA, is a school in Amsterdam-Zuid, a borough of Amsterdam, Netherlands. It was the first Montessori secondary school in the world.

The school is a lyceum with the directions VWO (atheneum and gymnasium), HAVO and VMBO-T.

The school is part of the Montessori Scholengemeenschap Amsterdam, or MSA, which encompasses five schools: Montessori Lyceum Amsterdam, Montessori College Oost, IVKO School, the Cosmicus Montessori Lyceum and Amstellyceum.

The school's main entrance is located on Pieter de Hoochstraat. The school comprises four main buildings and one building across the road. The school is the largest of the "MSA" schools, it has 1526 students and 137 teachers.

Students at the Montessori Lyceum Amsterdam work with a special system for doing their school work. There are periods of nine weeks called a "blok". In this period, pupils need to complete a set amount of homework. Each year has four "blokken".

== History ==
In 1928, some parents set up the 'Foundation for Senior and Preparatory High Montessori education '. On 11 September 1930 the school started its first day. On the second floor of a house at De Lairessestraat 157 fifteen students, two executives and eight teachers started the lessons. This was unique because Maria Montessori (who first came to the school in 1932 to see how the school functioned) only focused on primary schools.

The second year the number of students doubled, therefore the building across the street (De Lairessestraat 156) also had to be rented.

Because the teaching method at the Montessori Lyceum was different from regular schools, it took quite some time before the school was officially recognized (and more important subsidized). The school was also not allowed to take the final exam. In 1940 there was a small change, a part of the school (the girls' school, which in the years became more and more self-contained) was considered for subsidy by the government, which was already fled to England because of the war.

=== During World War II ===
The Lyceum started the war years from an economically unstable position. The chairman of the board was Hilda Gerarda de Booy-Boissevain (1877–1975) and secretary was Adelheid Debora Cnoop Koopmans-van Tienhoven (1893–1988), she was called Daisy.

Trying to subordinate the suppression of the occupier, they made a list in August 1941 (five months after the February strike) with the names of all the Jewish students and teachers. The list was given to the occupier around 11 September.

Jewish Students

Around 1940 the school established the Jewish Montessori Lyceum, where Jewish students and teachers (accounting for 1/3 of the school population) were placed. The school was recognized by Prof. Dr. Jan van Dam. The aim was to have this school run as parallel as possible to the Montessorilyceum. The Jewish Montessori Lyceum closed in 1942 because there were no more students and teachers left.

In 2005 a plaque was unveiled in memory of the students and teachers of the Montessori Lyceum who died during the Second World War:

- Rudi Acohen, 1922 – Auschwitz 30 September 1942
- Werner Basz, 1929 – Sobibor 9 July 1943
- Frits Arie van Blitz, 1920 – Sobibor 2 juli 1943
- Gi Boissevain, 1921 – executed Overveen 1 October 1943
- Janka Boissevain, 1920 – executed Overveen 1 October 1943
- Hilda Julie Caffé, 1925 – Auschwitz 3 September 1943
- Jop Dutilh, 1919 – Indian Ocean 19 June 1944
- Theo van Gogh, 1920 – Fusilladeplaats Rozenoord 8 March 1945
- Rudi Goldschmidt, teacher of classical languages, 1908 – Sobibor ?
- Jannie Gompertz, 1925 – Auschwitz 30 September 1942
- Lodewijk Jack Gompertz, 1928 – Bergen-Belsen 2 March 1945
- Rosa de Groot, 1921 – Auschwitz 3 November 1942
- Jur Haak, mathematics teacher, 1891 – Sachsenhausen 30 January 1945
- Jet Haak-van Eek, 1894 – Ravensbrück 6 December 1944
- Betty van Hess, 1922 – Sobibor 9 July 1943
- Renée van Hessen, 1932 – Auschwitz 3 September 1942
- Michel Herman Meijer de Jong, 1925 – Pyrenees 24 December 1944
- Herman Jacques Jordan, board member, 1877 – Wageningen 21 September 1943
- Hans Kalker, 1918 – Auschwitz 28 September 1942
- Eddy Konijn, 1920 – Auschwitz 30 September 1942
- Els Kuyper, 1921 – IJsselmeer 8 January 1945
- Marie Kijl, 1925 – Auschwitz 14 September 1942
- Freddy Lopes Cardozo, 1924 – Dachau 2 February 1945
- Leo Polak, board member, 1880 – Oranienburg 9 December 1941
- Enny van Raalte, 1924 – Auschwitz 11 February 1944
- Eddy Martin Santcroos, 1926 – Tröbitz 9 May 1945, after the liberation, got there through the lost transport
- Hans Schippers, 1923 – Amsterdam 8 March 1945
- Wim Schreuder, 1923 – Neuengamme 14 October 1944
- Rena Stenszewski, 1928 – Sobibor 9 July 1943
- Benno Floris Stibbe, 1925 – Auschwitz 30 September 1942
- Bram Tas, 1921 – East-Europe 14 November 1942
- Bennie Veershijm, 1925 – Sobibor 23 July 1943
- Isaac Jonathan Veershijm, 1929 – Sobibor 23 July 1943
- Nol de Vries, 1922 – Sobibor 4 June 1943
- Dina Louise van der Woude, 1928 – Sobibor 23 July 1943

It was striking that the school seemed to be more concerned to the occupier about the financial consequences of the removal of Jewish students than the measure itself. Presumably this is because there was hope for subsidy and this seemed to be the best option. In 1941 the Ministry of Education announced that the Montessori Lyceum would be put on the list to be fully subsidized and on 9 October of that same year it was decided that the Montessori Lyceum was fully recognized.

=== After World War II ===
After the war the school started a period of growth. In 1957 it was time for a move again, this time to the Anthonie van Dijckstraat. In the 1950s there was a lot of experimenting with new pedagogical ideas. Remains of this are the work weeks and the part-schools. At the end of the 60s it almost went wrong. The country became more democratic and people wanted to have more information and participation. Between September 1968 and January 1970, the conflicts played up in full force. It even came so far that a broad-based plan arose to allow external advisers to look at the problem. Ironically, the sudden death of the rector caused the school to fall into a completely embittered state and all the problems seemed to be gone.

In the ten years that followed, the number of students raised to more than a thousand. During this time some schools merged into the Montessori Scholengemeenschap Amsterdam. In 1977, the school exchanged buildings with the Ignatius College and ended up on the Pieter de Hoochstraat.

=== 21st century ===
In 2010–2019 the buildings proved insufficient to adapt to the requirements of modern times. It came down to the fact that the buildings from the early days, including the patershuis and chapel, were thoroughly renovated because of the protection of monuments. Two more modern wings were defeated, including a landmark building on the corner of Ruysdaelstraat and Hobbemakade. After renovation of the old buildings, the entrance was located on Nicolaas Maesstraat, after which the "modern buildings" were demolished. The complete refurbishment is expected to take place until 2025. The entrance was moved to Nicolaas Maesstraat 1.

== Notable (old-)students ==
- Sallie Harmsen (actress)
- Judith Herzberg (writer)
- Felix Rottenberg (old-chairman from the PvdA)
- Mance Post (illustrator)
- Trijntje Oosterhuis (singer)
- Tjeerd Oosterhuis (producer)
- Candy Dulfer (saxophonist)
- Johan van der Keuken (moviemaker and photographer)
- Herman Koch (writer)
- Cyrus Frisch (director)
- Mark Rietman (actor)
- Joram Lürsen (movie director)
- Paul Cohen (documentary producer)
- Clovis Cnoop Koopmans (children judge, vice president of the Amsterdam Court, First Chamber member for the PvdA, PvdA city councilor Amsterdam and nature conservationist)
- Herman Hertzberger (architect)
