= Amstellyceum =

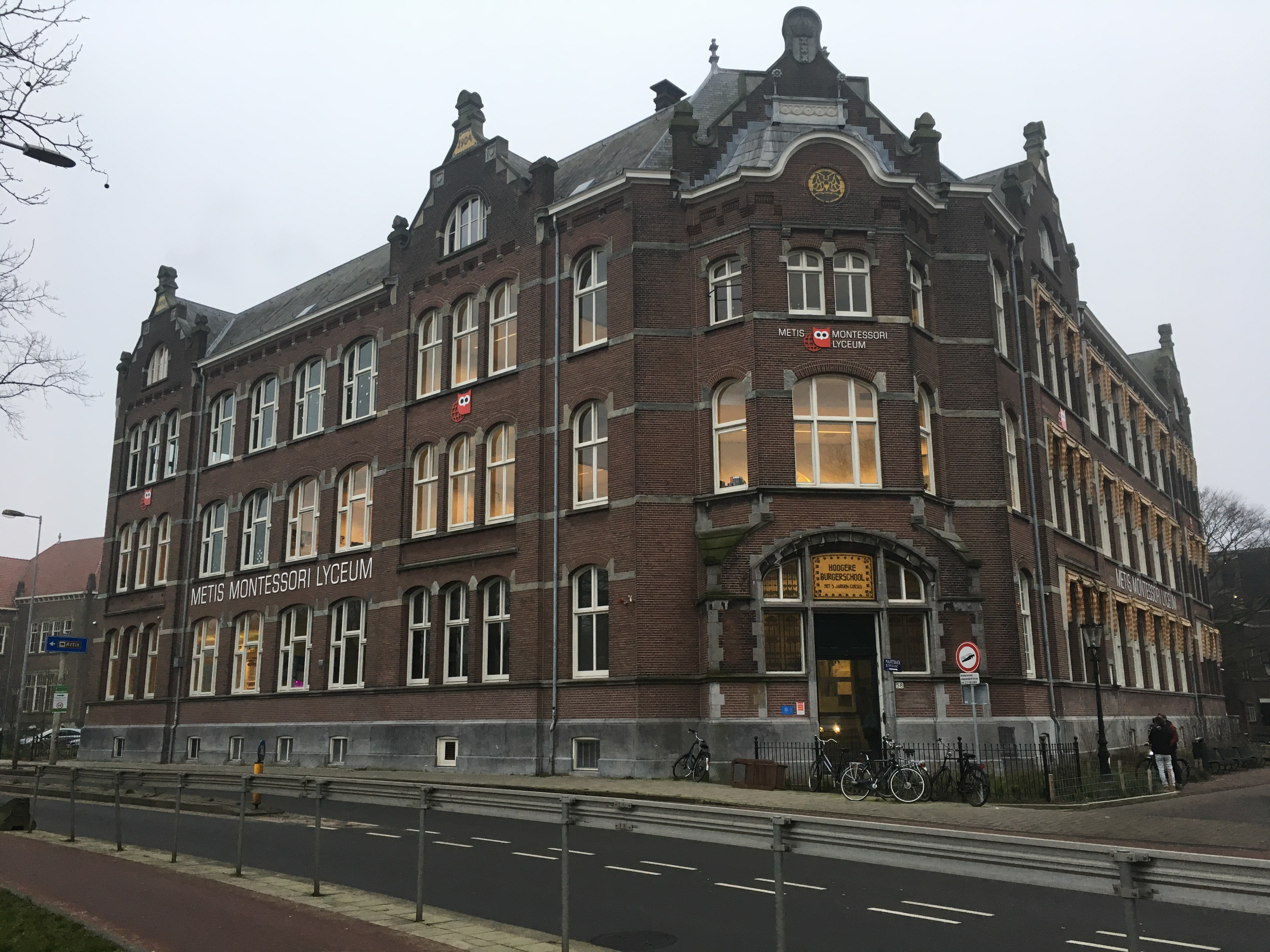
- Amstellyceum

Location
- Amsterdam; Netherlands
- Coordinates: 52°21′42.33″N 4°55′6.15″E

Information
- Type: School
- Enrollment: 480 (2005)
- Website: School website (in Dutch)

The Amstellyceum was a secondary school in Amsterdam, the Netherlands. It got cancelled and the Metis Montessori Lyceum is established there. The school was named after the river Amstel. It teaches, vmbo-tl, havo, and vwo (gymnasium and atheneum). In 2005, it had 480 students.

== General ==
The school was a Montessori Lyceum with directions Gymnasium (school), vwo (Atheneum), havo en vmbo-T. More than 50% of the students attended vmbo department of the school. In course year 08–09, the school had 504 students (including VAVO students) and 52 teachers. The pre-university education (VWO) is being phased out. There is a successful havo chance class.

== Cooperation ==
The school works with other montessorischools in Amsterdam. These are:

- Montessori Lyceum Amsterdam
- Montessori College Oost
- IVKO
- Cosmicus Montessori Lyceum

== See also ==
- List of schools in the Netherlands
