= Immaculate Wambua =

Kenyan diplomat

High Commissioner of the Republic of Kenya to Canada

Personal details
- Education: University of Nairobi; International Institute of Social Studies
- Awards: Ambassador of the Year 2023

Immaculate Wambua is a Kenyan diplomat. As of 2021 she is serving as the High Commissioner of the Republic of Kenya to Canada.

== Biography ==
Wambua studied a Bachelor of Arts (BA) Degree in Social Sciences and a Post-Graduate Diploma in Diplomacy and International Relations at the University of Nairobi in Kenya. She has also achieved a Master of Arts degree in Public Policy and Management (PPM) at the International Institute of Social Studies (ISS) in The Hague, Netherlands. She has served in diplomatic missions including in Brussels (Belgium and the European Union) and Dublin (Republic of Ireland).

In 2019, Wambua was appointed as Director of the Americas and the Caribbean Directorate in Kenya's Ministry of Foreign and Diaspora Affairs. In 2021, Wambua was appointed as Kenyan High Commissioner to Canada and presented her of letters of credence to Mary Simon, Governor General of Canada, on 3 November 2021.

In 2022, Wambua led Kenyan a delegation to the International Civil Aviation Organization (ICAO) in Montreal to deposit the Instrument of the Accession to The Protocol to Amend the Convention on Offences and Certain Other Acts Committed on Board Aircraft, also known as the Montreal Protocol. She has also met with ICAO Secretary General, Juan Carlos Salazar.

Wambua spoke at the Kenyan Canadian Association's 2023 International Women's Day Workshop and Celebration Dinner, held in Brampton, Ontario. She has worked with the Kenyan diaspora on voter registration. She has also met with delegations from the Tea Board of Kenya to discuss promoting the Kenyan tea industry abroad.

In 2023, Wambua was awarded the Ambassador of the Year 2023 Award by The International Public Diplomacy Council (IPDC) for "exemplary performance in Public Diplomacy and Diaspora Engagement."
