= 1946 Dutch Senate election =

- 12 July 1946
- All 50 seats in the Senate; 26 seats needed for a majority
Party	Leader	Vote %	Seats	+/–
KVP		34.06	17	+1
PvdA		26.62	14	0
ARP		12.69	7	0
CHU		9.43	5	−1
CPN		9.82	4	New
PvdV		5.78	3	0
This lists parties that won seats. See the complete results below.
President of the Senate before	President of the Senate after
Willem Lodewijk de Vos van Steenwijk; CHU	Roelof Kranenburg; VDB

Elections for all 50 seats in the Senate of the Netherlands were held on 12 July 1946. The snap election was the first held after the end of World War II.

Senators were elected by provincial councils in four "electoral groups". Group I comprised North Brabant, Zeeland, Utrecht and Limburg; group II comprised Gelderland, Overijssel, Groningen and Drenthe; group III comprised North Holland and Friesland; and group IV comprised South Holland. Within each electoral group, Senators were elected by provincial councils using party-list proportional representation. Provincial councillors' votes were weighted to their province's population.

The incumbent government, consisting of the Catholic People's Party (KVP) and the Labour Party (PvdA) won a combined majority of 31 seats. The Communist Party of the Netherlands (CPN) entered the Senate for the first time with four seats.

== Results ==
1946 Senate election
Party	Unweighted		Weighted		Seats	+/–
Party	Votes	%	Votes	%	Seats	+/–
Catholic People's Party	184	31.83	30,900	34.06	17	+1
Labour Party	158	27.34	24,152	26.62	14	0
Anti-Revolutionary Party	79	13.67	11,511	12.69	7	0
Communist Party of the Netherlands	50	8.65	8,912	9.82	4	New
Christian Historical Union	64	11.07	8,556	9.43	5	−1
Freedom Party	33	5.71	5,242	5.78	3	0
Reformed Political Party	10	1.73	1,454	1.60	0	0
Total	578	100.00	90,727	100.00	50	0
Valid votes	578	100.00	90,727	100.00		
Invalid/blank votes	0	0.00	0	0.00		
Total votes	578	100.00	90,727	100.00		
Registered voters/turnout	590	97.97	92,370	98.22		
Source: Staatscourant

=== By electoral group ===
1946 Senate election in electoral group I
Party	Unweighted		Weighted		Seats	+/–
Party	Votes	%	Votes	%	Seats	+/–
Catholic People's Party	110	58.82	17,058	66.98	9	0
Labour Party	38	20.32	4,578	17.98	2	+1
Anti-Revolutionary Party	15	8.02	1,614	6.34	1	0
Christian Historical Union	17	9.09	1,594	6.26	1	0
Reformed Political Party	5	2.67	368	1.44	0	0
Freedom Party	2	1.07	256	1.01	0	0
Communist Party of the Netherlands	0	0.00	0	0.00	0	New
Total	187	100.00	25,468	100.00	13	0
Valid votes	187	100.00	25,468	100.00		
Invalid/blank votes	0	0.00	0	0.00		
Total votes	187	100.00	25,468	100.00		
Registered voters/turnout	192	97.40	25,929	98.22		
Source: Staatscourant

1946 Senate election in electoral group II
Party	Unweighted		Weighted		Seats	+/–
Party	Votes	%	Votes	%	Seats	+/–
Labour Party	53	28.96	6,056	27.11	4	0
Catholic People's Party	37	20.22	5,297	23.71	3	0
Anti-Revolutionary Party	30	16.39	3,437	15.39	2	0
Christian Historical Union	27	14.75	3,411	15.27	2	0
Communist Party of the Netherlands	17	9.29	1,986	8.89	1	New
Freedom Party	17	9.29	1,856	8.31	1	0
Reformed Political Party	2	1.09	294	1.32	0	0
Total	183	100.00	22,337	100.00	13	0
Valid votes	183	100.00	22,337	100.00		
Invalid/blank votes	0	0.00	0	0.00		
Total votes	183	100.00	22,337	100.00		
Registered voters/turnout	189	96.83	23,303	95.85		
Source: Staatscourant

1946 Senate election in electoral group III
Party	Unweighted		Weighted		Seats	+/–
Party	Votes	%	Votes	%	Seats	+/–
Labour Party	42	33.33	6,918	32.52	4	−1
Communist Party of the Netherlands	23	18.25	4,286	20.15	2	New
Catholic People's Party	19	15.08	3,793	17.83	2	0
Anti-Revolutionary Party	22	17.46	3,292	15.48	2	0
Christian Historical Union	13	10.32	1,699	7.99	1	0
Freedom Party	7	5.56	1,282	6.03	1	0
Total	126	100.00	21,270	100.00	12	0
Valid votes	126	100.00	21,270	100.00		
Invalid/blank votes	0	0.00	0	0.00		
Total votes	126	100.00	21,270	100.00		
Registered voters/turnout	127	99.21	21,490	98.98		
Source: Staatscourant

1946 Senate election in electoral group IV
Party	Unweighted		Weighted		Seats	+/–
Party	Votes	%	Votes	%	Seats	+/–
Labour Party	25	30.49	6,600	30.49	4	0
Catholic People's Party	18	21.95	4,752	21.95	3	+1
Anti-Revolutionary Party	12	14.63	3,168	14.63	2	0
Communist Party of the Netherlands	10	12.20	2,640	12.20	1	New
Christian Historical Union	7	8.54	1,848	8.54	1	−1
Freedom Party	7	8.54	1,848	8.54	1	0
Reformed Political Party	3	3.66	792	3.66	0	0
Total	82	100.00	21,648	100.00	12	0
Valid votes	82	100.00	21,648	100.00		
Invalid/blank votes	0	0.00	0	0.00		
Total votes	82	100.00	21,648	100.00		
Registered voters/turnout	82	100.00	21,648	100.00		
Source: Staatscourant
