= Trude Maas-de Brouwer =

Dutch politician (born 1946)

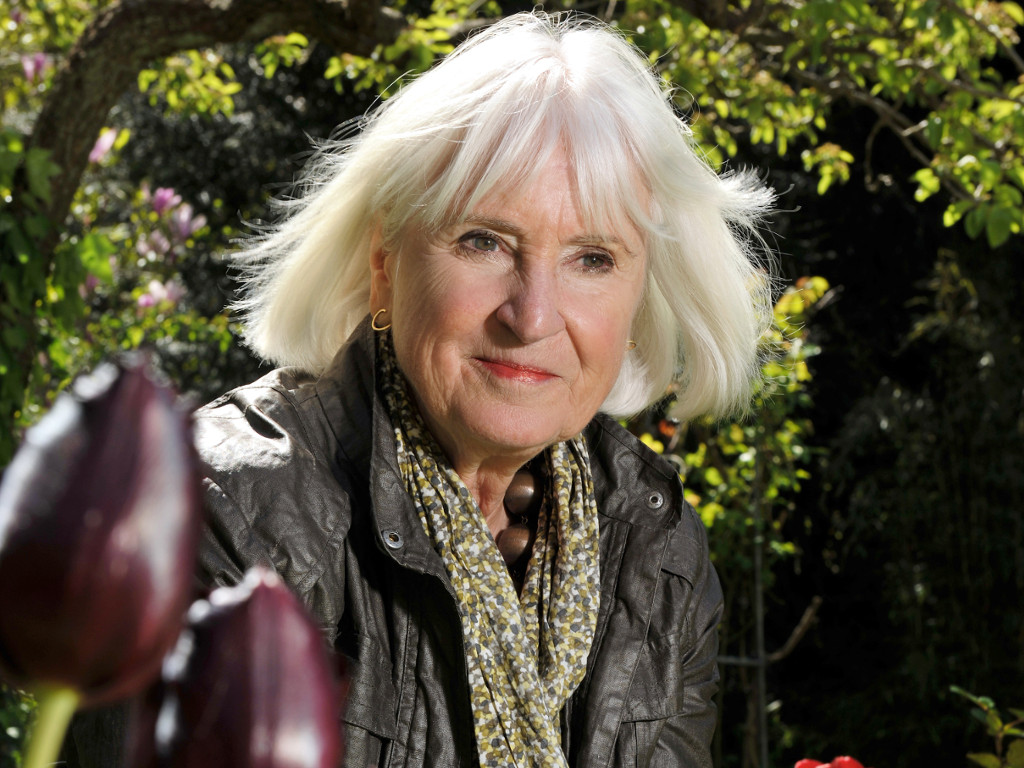

Member of the Senate
- In office 8 September 1998 – 8 June 1999

Member of the Senate
- In office 22 January 2002 – 12 June 2007

Personal details
- Born: Trude Albertine Maas-de Brouwer; 28 November 1946 (age 79) Amsterdam, Netherlands
- Party: Labour Party
- Spouse: Jan Maas
- Education: Utrecht University
- Occupation: Politician · Corporate director · Supervisory Board Member

Trude Albertine Maas-de Brouwer (born November 28, 1946, in Amsterdam) is a Dutch politician, executive and supervisory board member. She was a Member of the Senate for the Labour Party from 1998 until 1999 and from 2002 until 2007.

== Biography ==
=== Early life and education ===
At the age of eleven, Trude Maas moved from Amsterdam to Utrecht, where she attended the Thorbecke Lyceum. She later studied General Linguistics at Utrecht University, with minors in French and Educational Psychology. While studying, she worked as a French teacher.

=== Early career and business ===
After completing her studies, Maas joined the Central Institute for Test Development (CITO), starting as a French test developer and later becoming deputy director. From 1988, she held various executive positions at the ICT service provider Origin NL BV, including being a member of the management board. She later founded the think tank Hay Group Vision Society, where she served as president for several years.

Maas is particularly known for her involvement in education, innovation and talent development. She advocates for the development of information skills to foster critical thinking and lifelong learning in education. She also believes in greater recognition for self-taught individuals.

=== Political career ===
Maas entered the Senate in 1998, succeeding Job Cohen, who became a state secretary. She delivered her maiden speech on cultural policy, discussing the paradox of valuing one's culture while avoiding nationalism and questioning the government's role in promoting quality, diversity and accessibility. Her term ended in 1999 when she was not re-elected. In 2002, she returned to the Senate, succeeding Thijs Wöltgens. In the Senate, she chaired the permanent committee on Science Policy and Higher Education and was involved in Economic Affairs.

In 2005, Trude Maas-de Brouwer co-authored the report Brainport Navigator 2013: Lissabon voorbij!, prepared by the Sistermans Committee. This report served as a policy document for the ambition to develop the Eindhoven region into a leading European high-tech region, emphasizing the importance of collaboration between business, knowledge institutions and government.

In April 2007, Trude Maas-de Brouwer was part of an interim board of the Labour Party, chaired by Ruud Koole, following a crisis that led to the resignation of the previous board. From 2008 to 2016 she was a member of the Curatorium of the Wiardi Beckman Stichting, the research institute of the Labour Party.

=== Board memberships and supervisory roles ===
Maas has held various board positions in both profit and non-profit organisations. She was chair of the supervisory board at Philips Netherlands, a commissioner at ABN AMRO during its takeover struggle and nationalisation, a member of the supervisory board of Schiphol Group and Eindhoven University of Technology.

During the hearings of the Parliamentary Inquiry into the Financial System, former ABN commissioner Trude Maas-de Brouwer stated that the bank's commissioners acted too much as 'watchers' rather than supervisors. Reflecting on remuneration policies, she noted that the supervisory board did not sufficiently consider the consequences of variable rewards and their impact on behavior.

=== Views on supervision and leadership ===
Throughout her career, Maas has actively promoted diversity in governance and supervision, particularly advocating for the participation of women in top positions. She was one of the first female supervisors at major Dutch companies and served as a role model in this capacity. Believing that a variety of perspectives enhances the quality of decision-making, she has supported various initiatives aimed at facilitating the advancement of women into leadership roles. Maas has pointed out in interviews that diversity represents not only a societal value but also a governance advantage, with positive effects on risk management and innovation.

According to Maas, a supervisory board should form an opinion only after gathering as much information as possible. She emphasizes the importance of creating a culture of 'healthy skepticism' within the board, where the expression of dissenting opinions is encouraged. Maas advocates for a more open and interactive approach of supervisory boards towards other levels within the organisation. She believes that supervisors should actively engage with employees and works councils to gain a more comprehensive understanding of the organisational culture.

=== Societal functions ===
- In 2015, Maas established the Alliance for Participation and Governance at the Social and Economic Council, aimed at strengthening the dialogue between works councils, management and supervisors.
- Board member/Chair of the International Archives for the Women's Movement (IIAV) (2002-2008)
- Member/Chair of the Supervisory Board of Nuffic (2002-2010)
- Board member/Chair of the Van Leer Group Foundation (2001-2013) and Bernard van Leer Foundation (2002-2013)
- Chair of the Supervisory Board of the Van Gogh Museum (2012-2016)
- Board member of the Friends of the Anne Frank Museum (2011-2021)
- Columnist for Het Financieele Dagblad and the Digital University Journal (DUB) of Utrecht University
- Board member/Chair of the SIDN Fund (Foundation for Internet Domain Registration in the Netherlands) (2014-2023)

== Personal ==
Maas-de Brouwer is married to Jan Maas and lives in Utrecht. She studied in Utrecht and uses her network and experience to contribute to the city's development. Her father-in-law was a professor of mining engineering in Delft.

== Decorations ==
Honours
Ribbon bar	Honour	Country	Date	Comment
	Knight of the Order of Orange-Nassau	Netherlands	27 April 2012	
