= Hans Oskamp =

Dutch politician and linguist

Hans Pieter Atze Oskamp (12 December 1936 – 15 July 1990) was a Dutch politician and linguist. He was born in 1936 in Haren. In 1965, he worked as a scholar at the Dublin Institute for Advanced Studies for the school of Celtic Studies. He died in 1990 in Madeira.
