= Nol Maassen =

Dutch politician

Arnold (Nol) Maassen (August 18, 1922 in Amsterdam - July 3, 2009 in Langon, France) was a Dutch politician for the Labour Party (PvdA).

Maassen was a member of the States-Provincial of North Holland from 1974 to 1981 and a member of the Senate from 1981 to 1987. As a Senator he was spokesman for development aid, and was known as an anti-nuclear weapon pacifist.

He also worked as an employee with the postal service PTT, where he was dealing with complaints.
