= Lollum =

- Village
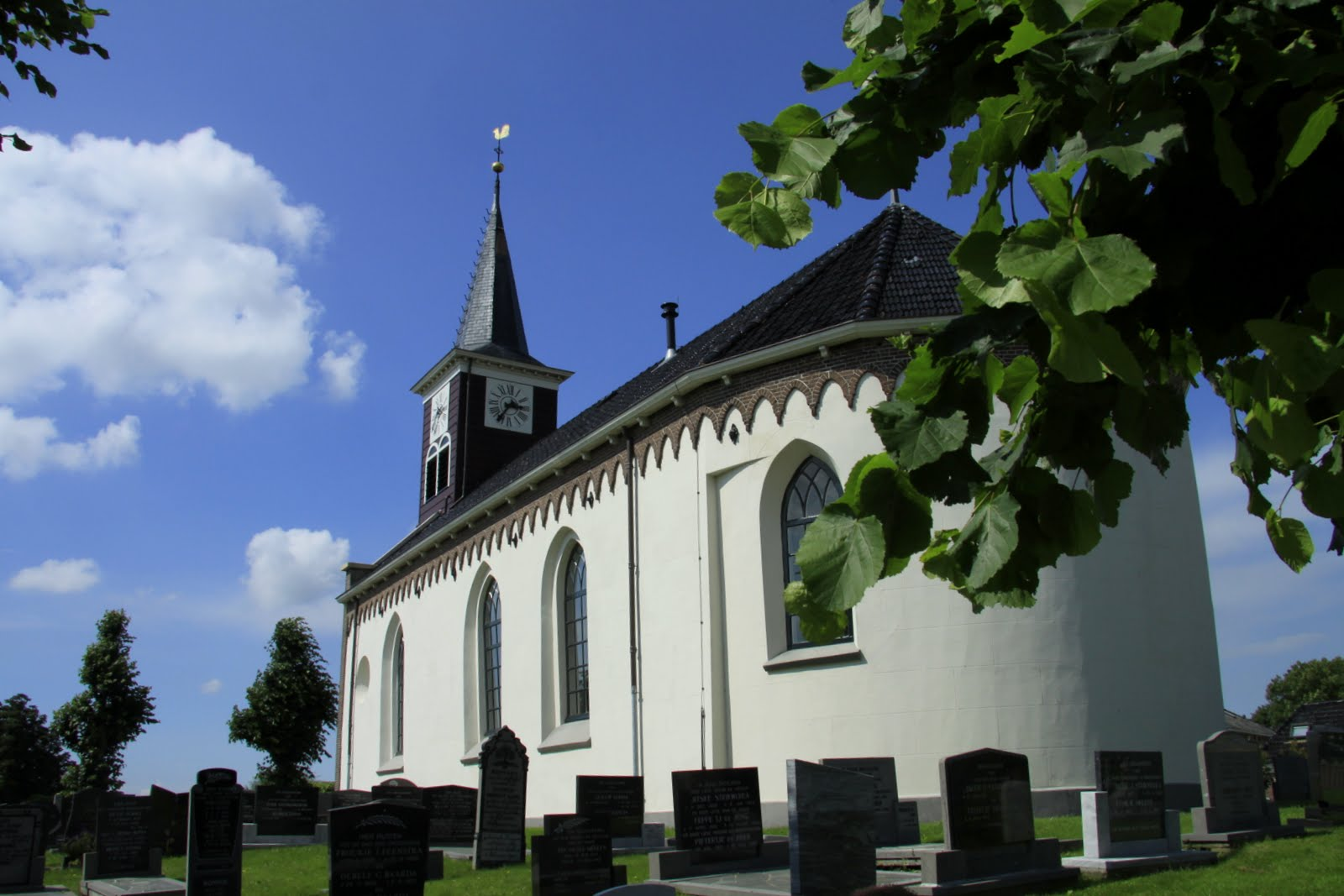
- Dutch Reformed church in Lollum

- Flag Coat of arms

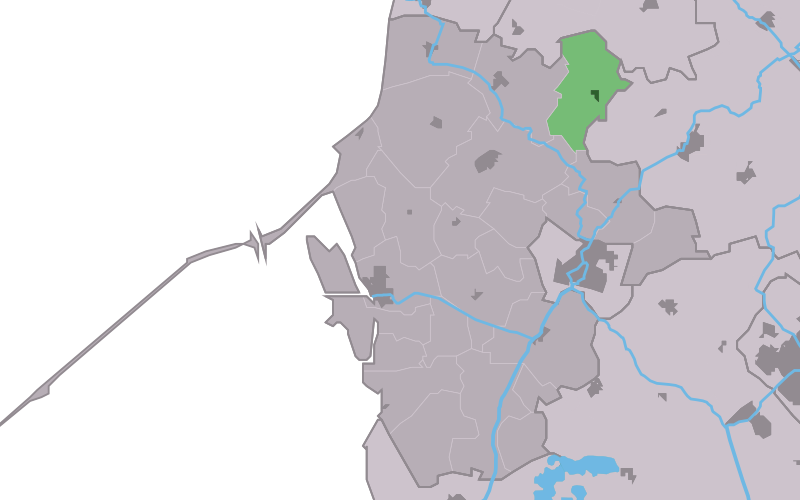
- Location in the former Wûnseradiel municipality

- Location in the Netherlands Lollum (Netherlands)
- Country: Netherlands
- Province: Friesland
- Municipality: Súdwest-Fryslân

Area
  - Total: 8.27 km^{2} (3.19 sq mi)
- Elevation: 0.1 m (0.33 ft)

Population (2021)
  - Total: 325
  - Density: 39.3/km^{2} (102/sq mi)
- Time zone: UTC+1 (CET)
  - Summer (DST): UTC+2 (CEST)
- Postal code: 8823
- Dialing code: 0517

Lollum is a village in Súdwest-Fryslân in the province of Friesland, the Netherlands. It had a population of around 360 in January 2017.

There is a restored windmill, Meerswal in the village.

== History ==
The village was first mentioned in the second half of the 13th century as Lolinghum, and means "settlement of the people of Lolle (person)". See also: Lolworth in England. Lollum is a terp (artificial living hill) village which developed in the middle ages. It used to be located outside the dike, because the Slachtedyk passes the village to the south.

The Dutch Reformed church dates from the 13th century, and was plastered during the 19th century. The small wooden tower was added in 1883 as a replacement of larger medieval tower. After the doleantie (schism in the Dutch Reformed church) most of the villagers joined the newly formed Reformed Church. A church was built 1915 and overshadows its Dutch Reformed colleague. In 2020, the Reformed Church was transformed into a community house with a local shop and a bed and breakfast in the tower.

Lollum was home to 169 people in 1840. The polder mill Meerswal was built in 1903. In 1970, it was destroyed in a storm and rebuilt in 1978. Before 2011, the village was part of the Wûnseradiel municipality.

== Gallery ==
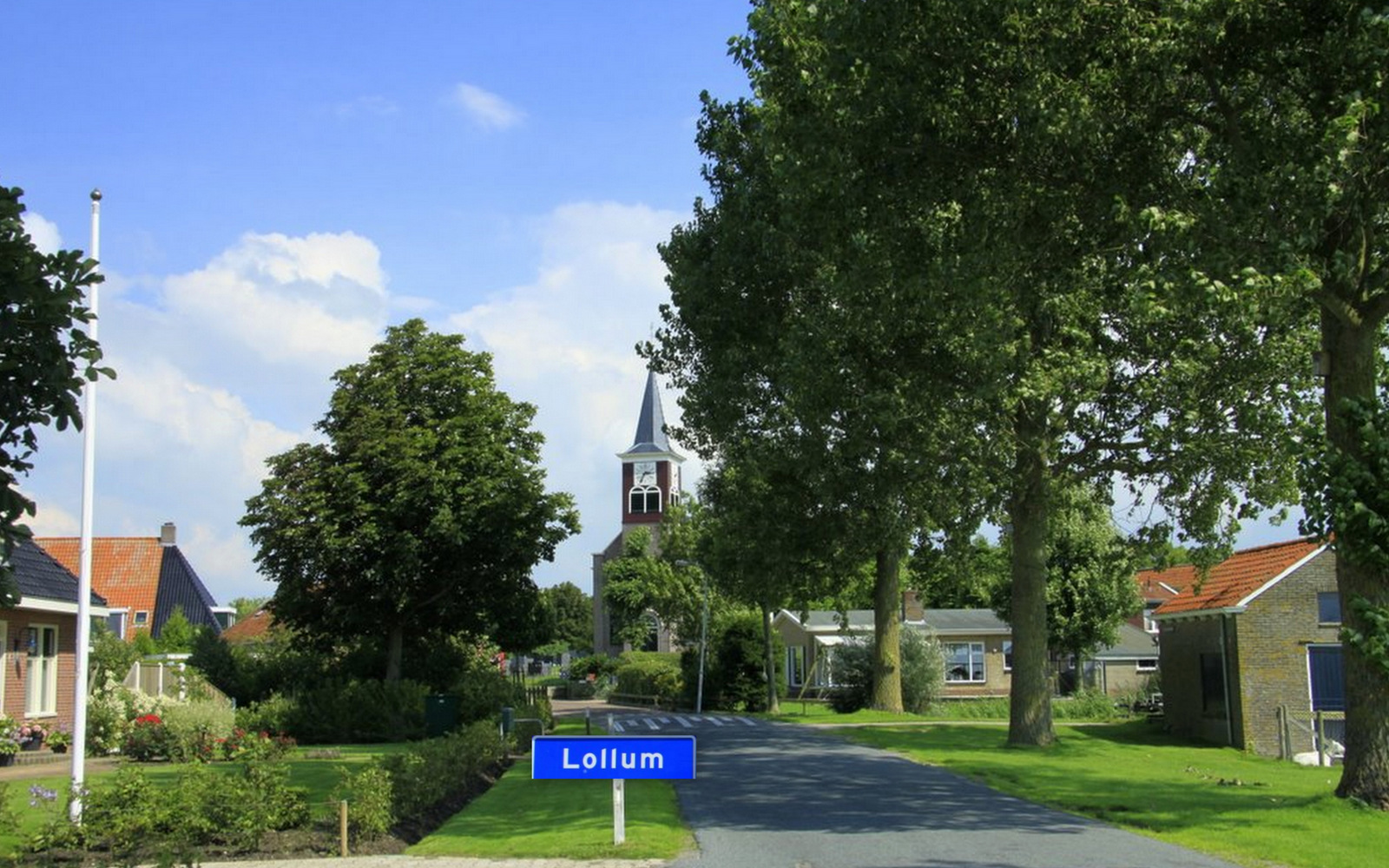
View of Lollum

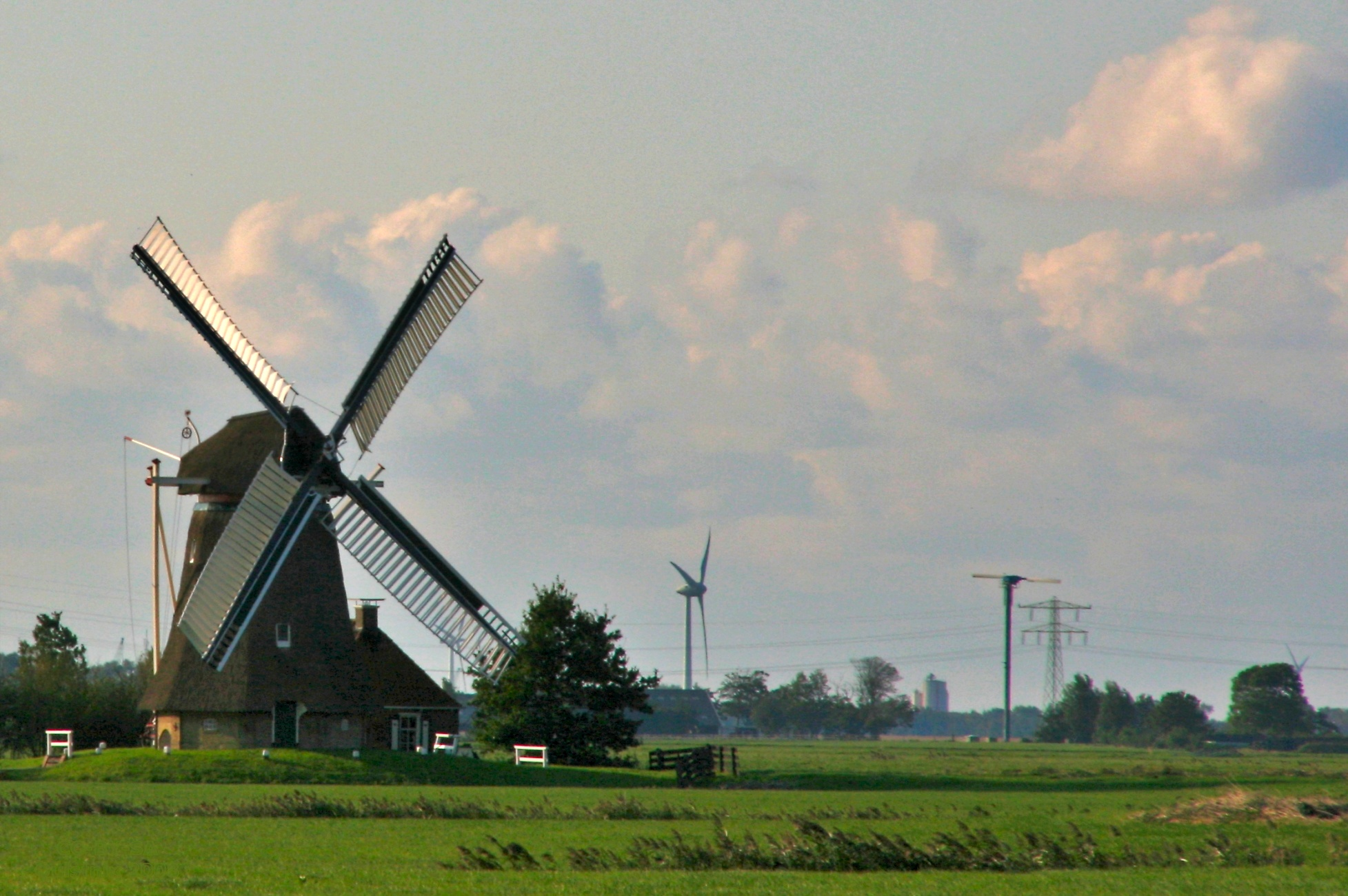
Windmill Meerswal
