= Friso Meeter =

Dutch lawyer and politician (1936–2025)

Member of the Senate
- In office 11 March 1997 – 8 June 1999

Personal details
- Born: 14 January 1936 Overschie, Netherlands
- Died: 5 March 2025 (aged 89) Rotterdam, Netherlands
- Party: Labour Party
- Occupation: Lawyer

Friso Meeter (14 January 1936 – 5 March 2025) was a Dutch lawyer and politician. He was a member of the Senate between 1997 and 1999 for the Labour Party.

== Life and career ==
Meeter was born on 14 January 1936 in Overschie. He studied Dutch law in Amsterdam. He spent time in Den Helder for the Royal Netherlands Navy. After finishing his studies Meeter returned to Rotterdam where he worked as a lawyer specializing in insolvency and held positions as a trustee in bankruptcy. He amongst other cases worked as trustee in the case of Rijn-Schelde-Verolme. Together with Louis Deterink he was the trustee for DAF NV in 1993.

Meeter served on the Rijnmondraad between 1974 and 1978. He was member of the Senate for the Labour Party from 11 March 1997 until 8 June 1999. In the Senate Meeter specialized in civil law and held the justice portfolio.

Meeter was married and had four children. Meeter died on 5 March 2025 in Rotterdam, aged 89.
