= Geertje Lycklama à Nijeholt =

Dutch politician

Member of the Senate
- In office 13 June 1995 – 10 June 2003

Group leader of the Labour Party in the Senate
- In office 8 June 1999 – 10 June 2003

Rector of the International Institute of Social Studies
- In office 1 June 1990 – 1 June 1995

Personal details
- Born: 2 April 1938 Lollum, Netherlands
- Died: 18 November 2014 (aged 76) The Hague, Netherlands
- Party: Labour Party

Geertje Lycklama à Nijeholt (2 April 1938 – 18 November 2014) was a Dutch politician and women and development studies scholar. She served as a member of the Senate of the Netherlands between 1995 and 2003 for the Labour Party. She was group leader in the Senate between 1999 and 2003. As a scientist she spend 16 years at the International Institute of Social Studies, of which five as rector.

== Career ==
Lycklama à Nijeholt was born on 2 April 1938 in Lollum, a rural village in Friesland, as member of the prominent Lycklama à Nijeholt family. Her father was an agrarian and municipal council member of Wûnseradiel. She received her primary education in Lollum and later went to school in Bolsward and Sneek. In 1956 she went to Amsterdam to study Western sociology at the VU University Amsterdam, earning her degree in 1963.

In 1962 she travelled to India and Pakistan to study Islam and the respective history of the countries. In October 1970, she took up a position as research assistant at Cornell University in Ithaca, New York, United States. One year later she was promoted to project director. Between 1973 and 1976 she worked on her thesis titled Migratory and Nonmigratory Farm Workers on the East Coast of the United States at both Cornell University as the VU University. She earned the title of doctor in 1976 at the VU University.

Lycklama à Nijeholt returned to the Netherlands and between 1977 and 1983 she coordinator of international women's affairs at the Dutch Foreign Ministry. Between 1979 and 1984 she was also guest professor at Wageningen University and Research Centre. She was professor of women and development studies at the International Institute of Social Studies (ISS) between August 1983 and June 1990. At that point she became the rector of the Institute, which she stayed until June 1995.

When her position as rector ended she became member of the Senate of the Netherlands for the Labour Party. She served between 1995 and 2003, and was group leader from 1999. During her first term (1995–1999) in the Senate she was part-time professor at the ISS.

She was member of the Koninklijke Hollandsche Maatschappij der Wetenschappen.

Lycklama à Nijeholt received the Aletta Jacobsprijs on 8 April 1992. She was made Knight in the Order of the Netherlands Lion on 31 May 1995. She died on 18 November 2014 after having been ill for several months. Dutch Prime Minister Mark Rutte spoke some words of remembrance on 2 December 2014 in the Senate, noting her role of putting forward women's rights in the Dutch foreign policy.
