= Marijke Linthorst =

Dutch politician

Marijke Linthorst drs.
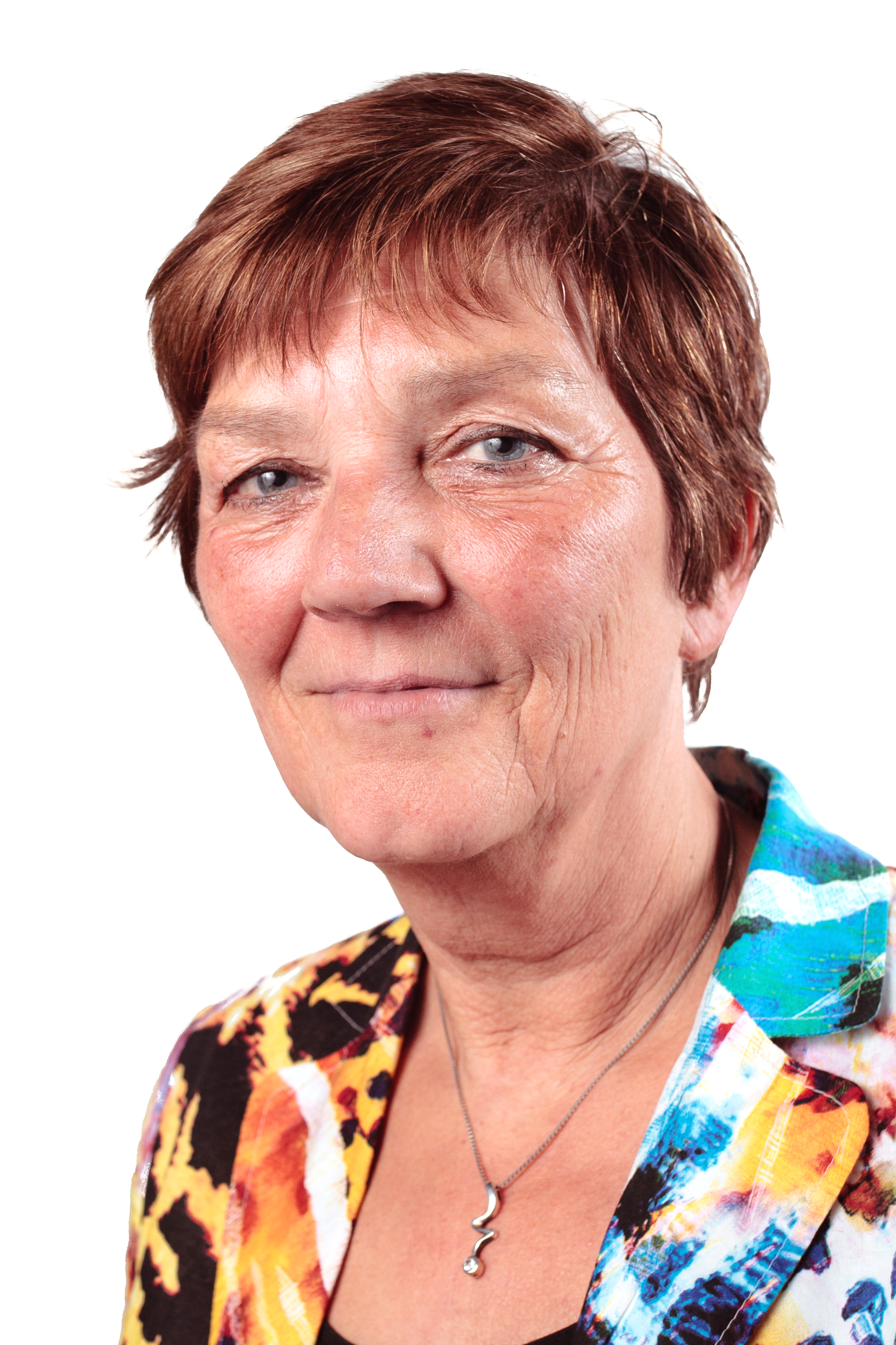

Member of the municipal council of Abcoude
- In office 1994–2000

Member of the Senate
- In office 1995–1999

Member of the Senate
- In office 2003–2015

Personal details
- Born: Maria Ynskje Linthorst; 16 February 1952 Amsterdam, Netherlands
- Died: 28 May 2025 (aged 73) Abcoude, Netherlands
- Party: Labour Party (PvdA)

Maria Ynskje (Marijke) Linthorst (16 February 1952 – 28 May 2025) was a Dutch politician. She was a member of the Senate for the Labour Party (PvdA) from 2003 to 2015. She had previously served as a Senator from 1995 to 1999. Earlier in her political career, Linthorst was a member of the municipal council of Abcoude from 1994 to 2000. In 2013, Linthorst was a candidate to succeed Fred de Graaf as President of the Senate. In the first round of voting, she received seven votes, and in the second round, six, finishing last. Ankie Broekers-Knol of the VVD was ultimately elected.

Marijke Linthorst died on 28 May 2025 at the age of 73.
