= Meine Pit =

Dutch politician

Member of the Senate
- In office 23 June 1987 – 11 June 1991; 28 September 1993 – 8 June 1999

Member of the States-Provincial of Gelderland
- In office January 1976 – 1981

Personal details
- Born: 9 November 1931 Steenwijkerwold, Netherlands
- Died: 1 February 2014 (aged 82) Woudrichem, Netherlands
- Party: Labour Party

Meine Pit (9 November 1931 – 1 February 2014) was a Dutch politician, he served at different times as a member of the Senate of the Netherlands, and States-Provincial of Gelderland between 1976 and 1999 for the Labour Party.

In the Senate Pit was party spokesperson for the topics of economic affairs and agriculture. He was the only party member to vote against the Betuweroute. In 1995 he was re-elected on the basis of preferential votes.
