= Nuffic =

Dutch non-profit organisation

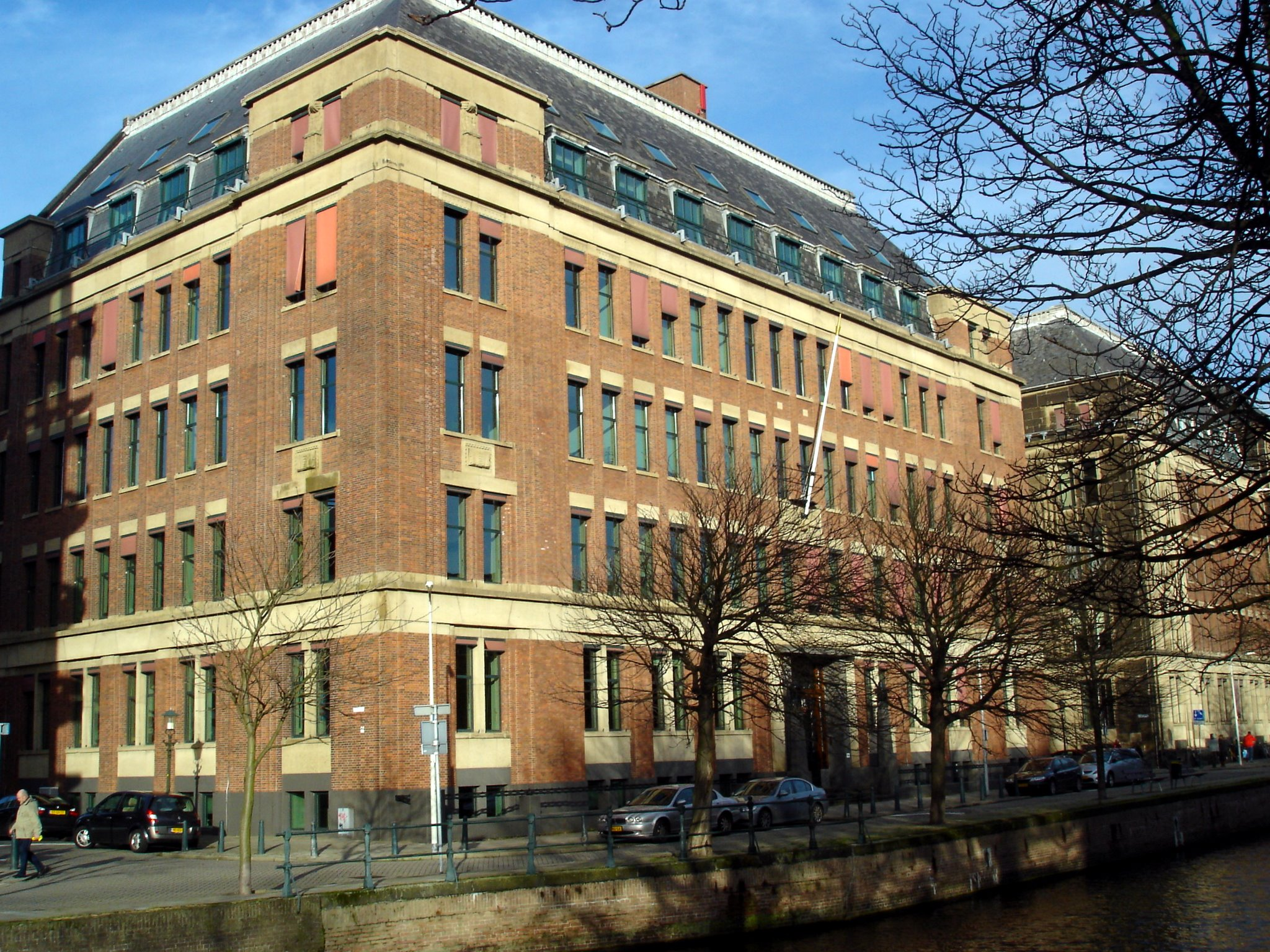
Nuffic's offices in The Hague, Netherlands

Nuffic is the Dutch organisation for internationalisation in education. It is an independent, non-profit organisation based in The Hague, the Netherlands.

Its most important contract partners are the Dutch Ministry of Education, Culture & Science and the Dutch Ministry of Foreign Affairs. Nuffic plays an important role in fostering international cooperation in education between the Netherlands and other countries.

Nuffic is part of the Dutch education field. Its goal is to support Dutch institutions and the Dutch government in internationalisation activities. The focus of its service lies in the Netherlands, even though its mission extends beyond that. To this end Nuffic cooperates with foreign partners, institutions and governments. The organisation dedicates itself primarily to the Dutch knowledge economy while at the same time stimulating capacity building in developing countries.

== Activities ==
Nuffic focuses on the following activities:

- managing programmes by order of the Dutch government, the European Union and third parties;
- encouraging international experience for students of all ages;
- strengthening the position and reputation of Dutch higher education and scientific research;
- evaluating diplomas and furthering transparency of education systems;
- joining and presenting knowledge and expertise.

== History ==
Nuffic was founded on 11 January 1952 by the president curators of the existing Dutch universities. The goal was primarily to organise English education for students from developing countries that had recently gained independence. For this purpose the Institute of Social Studies (ISS) was established, initially as part of Nuffic, but it became an independent institute in 1956. This is where the current role of Nuffic in development cooperation – management of scholarship programmes and institutional cooperation programmes – finds its roots.

The first official president was Prince Bernard of the Netherlands, who remained in that position for two years. After Queen Wilhelmina of the Netherlands moved to Het Loo Palace, Nuffic relocated to Noordeinde Palace until 1977. Currently, Nuffic is situated in another famous building in The Hague: the former headquarters of the PTT (Post, Telegraph, Telephone), an organisation that used to be state owned, on the Kortenaerkade. The building is a national monument.

Over the years Nuffic acquired a great number of other tasks. Since 1958 the organisation is involved in the recognition of international diplomas and making comparisons of education systems. Its efforts to support educational cooperation in Europe increased during the 1980s. At that time both The Hague and Brussels set up stimulation programmes, among which the Erasmus Programme.

Marco Schouten has been the Director-General of Nuffic since August 2025. From August 2021 till december 2024 Titia Bredée took up this position. She succeeds Freddy Weima, who left Nuffic in April 2021 to become chairman of the Dutch Association of Primary Schools (PO-Raad). Weima succeeded Sander van den Eijnden, who left Nuffic in the spring of 2012 to become President of the executive board of the Open University of the Netherlands.

In 2015 Nuffic merged with Europees Platform.
