= Annemarie Grewel =

Dutch politician and educator

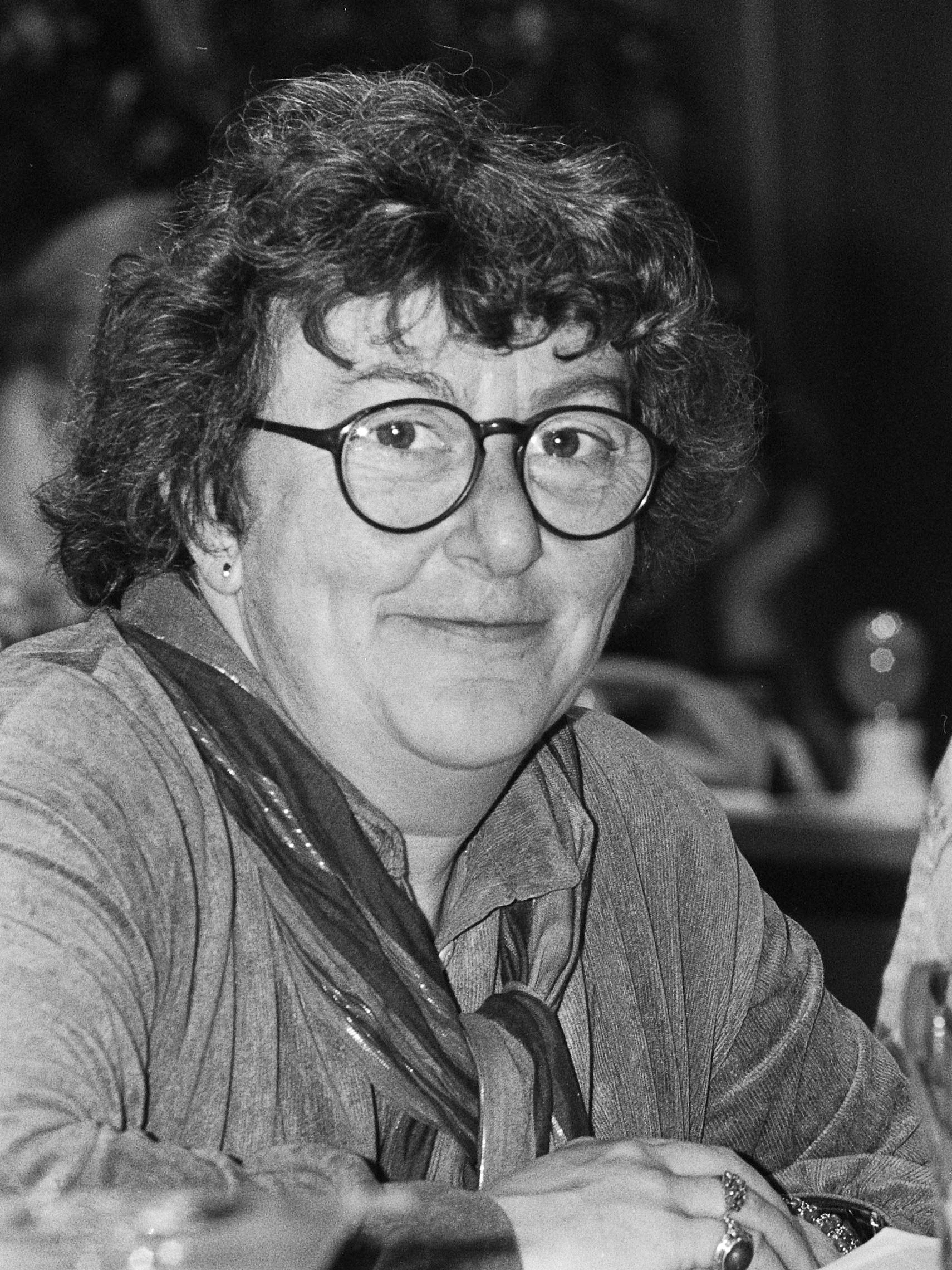
- Annemarie Grewel (1983)

Member of the Dutch Senate
- In office 13 June 1995 – 27 February 1998

Personal details
- Born: 13 June 1935 Amsterdam, Netherlands
- Died: 27 February 1998 (aged 62) Amsterdam, Netherlands
- Party: Labour Party (PvdA)
- Domestic partner: Nelly Frijda

Annemarie Grewel (13 June 1935 – 27 February 1998) was a Dutch senator, educator, and columnist. She was an openly lesbian politician. Grewel was usually the chairperson of Labour Party congresses. In 1982, she became a columnist for De Groene Amsterdammer. In 1986, she was elected to the municipal council of Amsterdam. In 1995, she was elected to the Dutch Senate.

== Biography ==
Grewel was born on 13 June 1935 in Amsterdam. She would describe her a family as elitist, bohemian Jews. During World War II, the family went into hiding. Annemarie, her parents and her brother survived the war. After the war, the family adopted an orphaned girl who had survived Bergen-Belsen.

Grewel studied pedagogy at the University of Amsterdam, and in 1963, she was appointed scientific assistant at the university. She would remain at the university until 1987. Around 1960, she fell in love with a woman, and became openly gay. Grewel also became politically active, and joined the Labour Party.

From 1975 until 1981, Grewel was chairperson of the University Council. During that period, she was often asked to chair congresses of the Labour Party. In 1982, she became a columnist for De Groene Amsterdammer. In 1983, Grewel was a candidate for Mayor of Amsterdam, but was not chosen.

In 1986, Grewel ran for the municipal council of Amsterdam and was elected. In 1989, she was knighted in the Order of Orange-Nassau. In 1995, she was elected to the Dutch Senate.

Grewel had been diagnosed with cancer, but continued to perform her duties. On 27 February 1998, she died at the age of 62 in Amsterdam.

Municipal elections in Amsterdam were scheduled on 6 March 1998, and Grewel was still on the ballot on the 8th position. She posthumously received 2,633 votes and would have been re-elected.

== Electoral history ==
A (possibly incomplete) overview of Dutch elections Grewel participated in
Election	Party	Candidate number	Votes
1986 Dutch municipal elections in Amsterdam	Labour Party	19	3,407
1990 Dutch municipal elections in Amsterdam	Labour Party	11	2,431
1994 Dutch municipal elections in Amsterdam	Labour Party	8	7,236
1994 Dutch general election	Labour Party	58	2,245
1998 Dutch municipal elections in Amsterdam	Labour Party	8	2,633
