= René van der Linden =

Dutch politician (born 1943)

Rene van der Linden
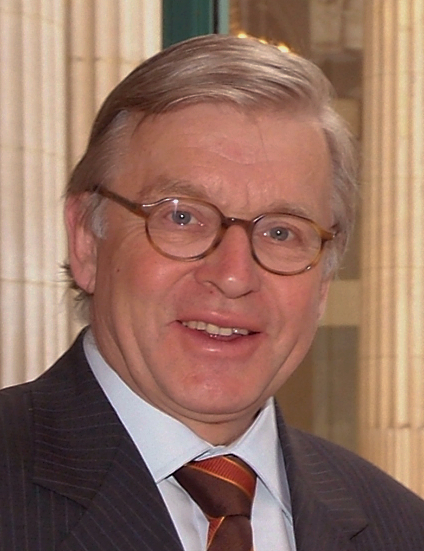
- Van der Linden in 2005

President of the Senate
- In office 6 October 2009 – 28 June 2011
- Preceded by: Yvonne Timmerman-Buck
- Succeeded by: Fred de Graaf

President of the Parliamentary Assembly of the Council of Europe
- In office 1 January 2005 – 1 January 2008
- Preceded by: Peter Schieder
- Succeeded by: Lluís Maria de Puig

Member of the Senate
- In office 8 June 1999 – 9 June 2015

State Secretary for Foreign Affairs
- In office 14 July 1986 – 9 September 1988
- Prime Minister: Ruud Lubbers
- Preceded by: Wim van Eekelen
- Succeeded by: Berend-Jan van Voorst tot Voorst

Member of the House of Representatives
- In office 29 November 1988 – 19 May 1998
- In office 8 June 1977 – 14 July 1986

Personal details
- Born: Pierre René Hubert Marie van der Linden; 14 December 1943 (age 82) Eys, Netherlands
- Party: Christian Democratic Appeal (from 1980)
- Other political affiliations: Catholic People's Party (until 1980)
- Education: Catholic University Brabant (Bachelor of Economics, Master of Economics)
- Occupation: Politician · Diplomat · Civil servant · Economist · Researcher · Political consultant · Corporate director · Nonprofit director · Trade association executive · Education administrator · Teacher · Author · Lobbyist

Pierre René Hubert Marie van der Linden (born 14 December 1943) is a retired Dutch politician and diplomat of the Catholic People's Party (KVP) and later the Christian Democratic Appeal (CDA) and economist.

Van der Linden applied at the Catholic University Brabant in June 1964 majoring in Economics and obtaining a Bachelor of Economics degree in June 1966 and worked as student researcher before graduating with a Master of Economics degree in July 1970. Van der Linden worked as an economics teacher in Tilburg from April 1969 until July 1971. Van der Linden worked as a civil servant for the department of Food Quality of the Ministry of Agriculture and Fisheries from July 1971 until January 1973 and served as Chief of staff for the European Commissioner of the Netherlands from January 1973 until January 1977 serving under Pierre Lardinois from January 1973 until January 1977 and for Henk Vredeling from January 1977 until June 1977.

Van der Linden was elected to the House of Representatives after the 1977 general election, taking office on 8 June 1977 serving as a frontbencher and spokesperson for European affairs and agriculture and deputy spokesperson for foreign affairs and Benelux. After the 1986 general election Van der Linden was appointed as State Secretary for Foreign Affairs in the Lubbers II cabinet, taking office on 14 July 1986. On 9 September 1988 Van der Linden resigned following the conclusions of a parliamentary inquiry report into a passport fraud investigation that was mishandled by his predecessor as State Secretary for Foreign Affairs Wim van Eekelen who was then serving as Minister of Defence and who had resigned four days earlier on 6 September 1988. Van der Linden returned as a Member of the House of Representatives following the appointment of Jeltien Kraaijeveld-Wouters as mayor of Hilversum, taking office on 29 November 1988 serving again as a frontbencher chairing the parliamentary committee for Foreign Affairs and spokesperson for foreign affairs, European affairs, agriculture and Benelux. In December 1997 Van der Linden announced that he would not stand for the 1998 general election and continued to serve until the end of the parliamentary term on 19 May 1998. Van der Linden remained in active in national politics, he was elected to the Senate after the 1999 Senate election, taking office on 8 June 1999 serving as a frontbencher chairing the parliamentary committee for European Affairs and spokesperson for foreign affairs and deputy spokesperson for agriculture and Benelux. Van der Linden also served as President of the Parliamentary Assembly of the Council of Europe from 1 January 2005 until 1 January 2008. Van der Linden also became active in the private sector and public sector and occupied numerous seats as a corporate director and nonprofit director on several boards of directors and supervisory boards (Atlantic Association, Robeco, Oxfam Novib, Trilateral Commission, Akkerbouw, Van Lanschot and Institute of International Relations Clingendael). Van der Linden also worked as a trade association executive for the Industry and Employers confederation (VNO-NCW) and as an education administrator for the Maastricht School of Management serving as Chairman of the Education board from October 1999 until November 2016. Van der Linden was nominated as President of the Senate following the appointed of Yvonne Timmerman-Buck as a Member of the Council of State, serving from 6 October 2009 until 28 June 2011. In November 2014 Van der Linden announced that he wouldn't stand for the Senate election of 2015 and continued to serve until the end of the parliamentary term on 9 June 2015.

== Education ==
Economics: international administrative studies at Catholic Economics Faculty in Tilburg, (1966–1970), (now known as Tilburg University)

== Career ==
- Member of the First Chamber (Senate) of the States-General of the Netherlands (1999–2015)
- President of the First Chamber (Senate) of the States-General of the Netherlands (from 2009 until 2011)
- President of the Committee for European cooperation of the First Chamber of the States-General (from 2002 to 2009)
- Member of the Second Chamber of the States-General of the Netherlands (1977–1986 and 1988–1998)

Secretary of State for Foreign Affairs with responsibility for European Affairs (1986–1988)

- Member of the cabinet of European Commissioner Pierre Lardinois (1973–1977) and European Commissioner Henk Vredeling (1977)
- Civil servant, Ministry of Agriculture and Fisheries of the Netherlands (1971–1973)
- Teacher of economics (1969)

=== Other posts currently held ===
- Council of Europe Parliamentary Assembly (PACE) member (since 1989)
- Member of the Parliamentary Assembly of the Western European Union (WEU)
- Member of the executive board of the Dutch employers’ confederation
- Board member of Kerk en Nood (Church and Need)
- Chairman of the Maastricht School of Management (since 1999)
- Board member of several associations in the agricultural sector

=== Party political posts ===
Chairperson of EPP/CD group in the Council of Europe Parliamentary Assembly (PACE) (1999–2005) and vice-chairperson (1989–1999) Second vice-chairperson of the Christian Democratic political group, CDA, Second Chamber of the States-General of the Netherlands (1982–1986) Member of the party executive of the CDA Member of the party executive of the former Catholic Popular Party, (KVP), and vice-chairman of the KVP youth section

=== Other posts previously held ===
- President of the Parliamentary Assembly of the Council of Europe (2005–2008)
- Chairperson of the Netherlands delegation to PACE (2003–2005)
- Delegated representative of the First Chamber of the States-General of the Netherlands to the Convention on the Future of the European Union
- Patron of Stichting Lisboa, homeless children in Portugal (1995)
- Chairman of the advisory committee of the national school of translators and interpreters, Rijkshogeschool Opleiding tolk-vertaler (1990)
- Adviser to Combined Chambers of Commerce in Limburg (1989 and 1992)
- Member of Consultative Interparliamentary Benelux Council (1977–1986)
- Board member of the Netherlands Organisation for international assistance, NOVIB,
- President of several cultural foundations

Van der Linden was secretary of state of foreign affairs in the Dutch cabinet Lubbers II. He was responsible for the passport fiasco which was caused by ministerial incompetence (Dutch: paspoortaffaire).

== Controversies ==
=== Controversial claims about citizenship issues in Baltic Countries ===
During a press conference in Tallinn on 19 September 2007, a controversy ensued when Linden accused Estonia of not permitting non-citizen residents to take part in local elections. Former Prime Minister of Estonia Mart Laar attempted to correct him, pointing out that all permanent residents in Estonia have the right to vote (but not to be elected) in local elections. However van der Linden referred to reports of the Amnesty International and other human rights organizations.

In reaction, the Estonian Social Democratic Party issued a statement calling that van der Linden be immediately dismissed from his post. Admitting that Linden's term of office is due to end in late 2007 anyway, the statement declared that he had with his inaccurate comments disqualified himself.

On 2 October 2007, speaker of Estonian Parliament, Ene Ergma, sent a strongly worded open letter to van der Linden, asking him to do his homework and "give up spreading erroneous information about Estonia", which "created confusion and bewilderment both in the Estonian public and internationally." In his reply, van der Linden expressed amazement at the content of the letter and the fact that Ene Ergma made accusations public before giving him any right of reply. He also pointed out that Ene Ergma never expressed such views to him during their meeting, which took place less than two weeks before.

Later that month, in a press conference in Lithuania, he claimed that millions of people live without status in the Baltic countries. The population of Estonia is roughly 1,342,000, of which roughly 8.5% are without defined citizenship.

=== Alleged financial interest in Russia ===
In August 2007, van der Linden became embroiled in controversy after articles in the Eesti Päevaleht suggested that van der Linden's family had business interests in Russia. This is suspected to explain his lack of criticism towards Putin and the Russian government for human rights violations and his pro-Russia and anti-Baltic stand, as well as his stand against relocating the Bronze Soldier of Tallinn from central Tallinn.

After a 3 October 2007 phone call from van der Linden, threatening investigation by French police, Marko Mihkelson, chairman of the Estonian parliament's European Union affairs committee, held a press conference on 8 October 2007 where he presented materials collected from various publicly available Russian media sources in which central topic is van der Linden's role as the head of the supervisory council of a certain Dutch investment company that established the biggest industrial park in Europe in Sobinsk, Russia in late 2006. Subsequently, van der Linden denied all accusations and stated that he never had any financial interest in Russia neither is he serving as mentioned chairman. He was called the head of the supervisory board of Noble House Group at the home page of the Dutch investment company Noble House Trading. However, a representative of Noble House Holding told Estonia's ETV, on 7 October 2007, that van der Linden is not a member of the company's supervisory board and that the supervisory board would be appointed only next year.

=== Alleged Security Risk due to Russia ===
In November 2022 Van der Linden was reported to be monitored and having his phone tapped by the dutch security service AIVD due to his ties to close associates to Vladimir Putin. As such Van der Linden was accused of being a "Russian pawn", having been in close contact with an exposed Russian spy and having traveled in Europe at the expense of Russians.

== Decorations ==
=== National ===
- Grand Officer of the Order of Orange-Nassau (9 June 2015)
- Knight of the Order of the Netherlands Lion (21 December 1988)
- Knight of the Order of Orange-Nassau (18 May 1998)

=== Foreign ===
- Belgium: Officer of the Order of Leopold II (21 January 2011)
- Denmark: Commander 1st Class of the Order of the Dannebrog (19 August 2009)
- France: Commander of the Order of Legion of Honour (1 November 2007)
- Germany: Commander of the Order of Merit of the Federal Republic of Germany (6 May 2004)
- Holy See:
  - Knight of the Order of St. Gregory the Great (20 October 2003)
  - Knight of the Order of the Holy Sepulchre (17 February 1987)
- Italy: Grand Officer of the Order of Merit of the Italian Republic (15 September 2005)
- Luxembourg: Commander of the Order of the Oak Crown (18 April 1988)
- Philippines: Recipient of the Presidential Medal of Merit (30 January 2005)
- Poland: Officer of the Order of Polonia Restituta (30 April 2006)
- San Marino: Knight Grand Cross of the Order of San Marino (22 July 2006)
- Spain: Commander of the Order of Isabella the Catholic (10 December 1990)
- Turkey: Recipient of the Order of the Republic (14 February 2013)

=== Other honours ===
- Honorary citizen of Nafplio
- Honorary citizen of Liège
- Honorary President of the Parliamentary Assembly of the Council of Europe
- Friendship Award of Azerbaijan Republic 2013

Political offices
Preceded by Wim van Eekelen	State Secretary for Foreign Affairs; 1986–1988	Succeeded by Berend-Jan van Voorst tot Voorst
Preceded by Peter Schieder	President of the Parliamentary; Assembly of the Council of Europe; 2005–2008	Succeeded by Lluís Maria de Puig
Preceded by Yvonne Timmerman-Buck	President of the Senate; 2009–2011	Succeeded by Fred de Graaf
