= Den Uyl cabinet =

Cabinet of the Netherlands, 1973 to 1977

- Cabinet of the Netherlands

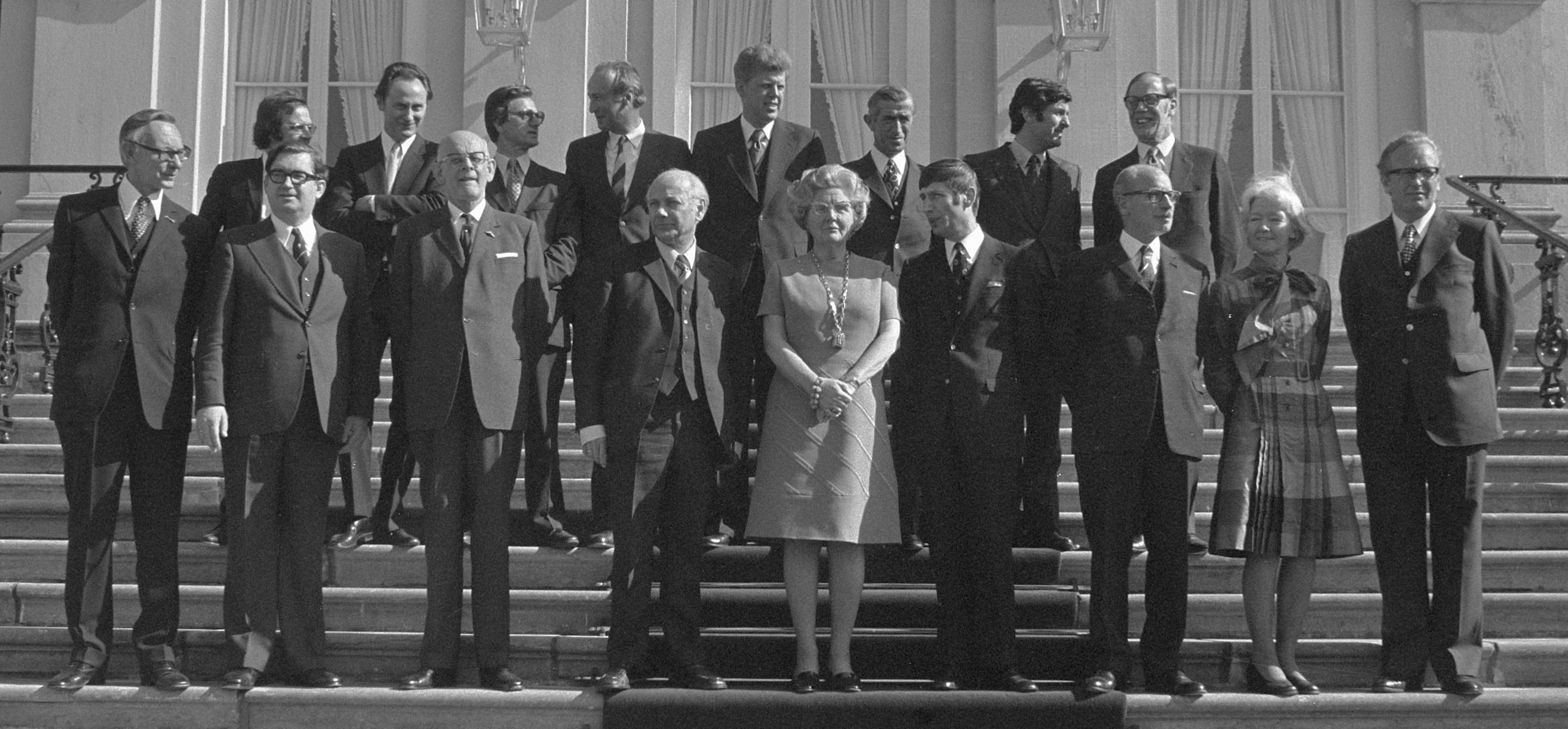
- The installation of the Den Uyl cabinet on 11 May 1973
- Date formed: 11 May 1973
- Date dissolved: 19 December 1977 (Demissionary from 22 March 1977)

People and organisations
- Head of state: Queen Juliana
- Head of government: Joop den Uyl
- Deputy head of government: Dries van Agt (1973–1977); Gaius de Gaay Fortman (1977)
- No. of ministers: 16
- Ministers removed: 3
- Total no. of members: 18
- Member party: Labour Party (PvdA); Catholic People's Party (KVP); Anti-Revolutionary Party (ARP); Political Party of Radicals (PPR); Democrats 66 (D'66)
- Status in legislature: Centre-left majority government (Grand coalition)

History
- Incoming formation: 1972–1973 formation
- Outgoing formation: 1977 formation
- Election: 1972 general election
- Outgoing election: 1977 general election
- Legislature terms: 1972–1977
- Predecessor: Second Biesheuvel cabinet
- Successor: First Van Agt cabinet

The Den Uyl cabinet was the cabinet of the Netherlands from 11 May 1973 until 19 December 1977. The cabinet was formed by the social democratic Labour Party (PvdA), the Christian democratic Catholic People's Party (KVP) and Anti-Revolutionary Party (ARP), the progressive Political Party of Radicals (PPR) and the social liberal Democrats 66 (D'66) after the 1972 general election. The cabinet was a centre-left grand coalition and had a substantial majority in the House of Representatives with Labour Leader Joop den Uyl serving as Prime Minister. Prominent Catholic politician Dries van Agt, the Minister of Justice from the previous cabinet, served as Deputy Prime Minister until his resignation. Prominent Protestant politician Gaius de Gaay Fortman, the Minister of the Interior, assumed the office of Deputy Prime Minister on 8 September 1977.

The cabinet served during the tumultuous 1970s and had to deal with several major crises such as the 1973 oil crisis, the Lockheed scandal, the Moluccans incidents and the fallout of the Yom Kippur War. Internally the cabinet suffered several conflicts, including the poor working relationship between Prime Minister Den Uyl and Deputy Prime Minister Van Agt, and multiple resignations. The cabinet fell on 22 March 1977, just before the end of its term, following a major political crisis, and continued in a demissionary capacity until it was replaced following the election of 1977.

== Formation ==
Composition of the cabinet in relation to the rest of the legislature

After the 1972 general election the Labour Party (PvdA) of Joop den Uyl was the winner of the election, winning four new seats and having now a total of 43 seats. Prior to the election the PvdA had formed a political alliance with the progressive Christian Political Party of Radicals and the social liberal Democrats 66, but this alliance failed to achieve a majority in the House of Representatives. After lengthy negotiations the Christian democratic Catholic People's Party (KVP) and Anti-Revolutionary Party (ARP) agreed to start talks about joining the coalition. During the formation negotiations between the parties were difficult because of disputes between uncompromising left-wing radicals and the moderate factions of the left-wing parties and the left-wing Christians. In the end both the KVP and the ARP joined the cabinet.

== Term ==
The Den Uyl cabinet was confronted with many problems, starting with the 1973 oil crisis following Dutch support of Israel in the Yom Kippur War. Prime Minister Joop den Uyl said in a speech on national television that "things would never return to the way they were" and implemented fuel rationing and a ban on Sunday driving.

Domestically the cabinet had several major conflicts, including the terrorist attacks by Moluccans seeking independence from Indonesia, the Lockheed affair (bribes accepted by the prince consort) and the closing of the Bloemenhove abortion clinic. Many plans could not be implemented because of these problems.

The Den Uyl cabinet continued efforts of its predecessor cabinet to revise the Constitution. The responsible government commissioner was allowed to stay on, and interior minister Gaius de Gaay Fortman presented a memorandum to the House of Representatives in June 1974. Major proposals such as an elected formateur and changes to the Senate did not survive committee. Three bills were submitted to the House in April 1976; all passed except one on constitutional reforms of education.

The cabinet fell because of a disagreement over land development plans. A deeper cause was the left-wing distrust of the Christian ministers, especially in the case of war criminal Pieter Menten, where Deputy Prime Minister and Minister of Justice Dries van Agt was ridiculed (so Van Agt believed) by some party members of Prime Minister Joop den Uyl.

=== Changes ===
On 1 November 1973, Minister of Agriculture and Fisheries Tiemen Brouwer (KVP) resigned for reasons of health; shortly after he took office, he suffered a brain haemorrhage. That same day State Secretary of Finance Fons van der Stee (KVP) was installed as Minister of Agriculture and Fisheries. On 21 December 1973, Martin van Rooijen (KVP), who until then had been working as the head of the fiscal tax department for Royal Dutch Shell, was appointed as State Secretary of Finance.

On 1 March 1974, State Secretary of Defence Joep Mommersteeg (KVP) resigned because of health problems. On 11 March 1974, brigadier general Cees van Lent (KVP), who until then had been working as Chief of the Personnel Department of the Royal Netherlands Army, was installed as his successor.

On 27 May 1975, State Secretary of Justice Jan Glastra van Loon (D'66) resigned due to a conflict with top officials at the Ministry of Defence after criticising the department's leadership in an interview. On 6 June 1975, former Utrecht Alderman Henk Zeevalking (D'66) was appointed his successor.

On 1 September 1975, State Secretary of Education and Sciences Antoon Veerman (ARP) resigned because of health reasons. That same day, Klaas de Jong Ozn. (ARP), who until then had been working as rector of the Christian school in Amersfoort, was installed as his successor.

On 1 January 1977, Minister of Defence Henk Vredeling (PvdA) resigned after he was appointed as European Commissioner for Employment and Social Affairs. That same day, State Secretary for Defence Bram Stemerdink (PvdA) was appointed as his successor.

On 1 May 1977, State Secretary of the Interior Wim Polak (PvdA) resigned after he was appointed Mayor of Amsterdam; because the cabinet was already demissionary he was not replaced.

On 8 September 1977, Deputy Prime Minister and Minister of Justice Dries van Agt (KVP) resigned because of the dualism of the constitutional convention in the States General of the Netherlands after he was elected to the House of Representatives. Minister of the Interior Gaius de Gaay Fortman (ARP) took over both positions until the new cabinet was installed on 19 December 1977.

For the same reason, on 8 September 1977 State Secretary of Foreign Affairs Laurens Jan Brinkhorst (D'66), State Secretary of Justice Henk Zeevalking (D'66), State Secretary of Economic Affairs Ted Hazekamp (KVP), State Secretary of Education and Sciences Ger Klein (PvdA), State Secretaries for Housing and Spatial Planning Jan Schaefer (PvdA) and Marcel van Dam (PvdA) and State Secretary of Culture, Recreation and Social Work Wim Meijer (PvdA) also resigned.

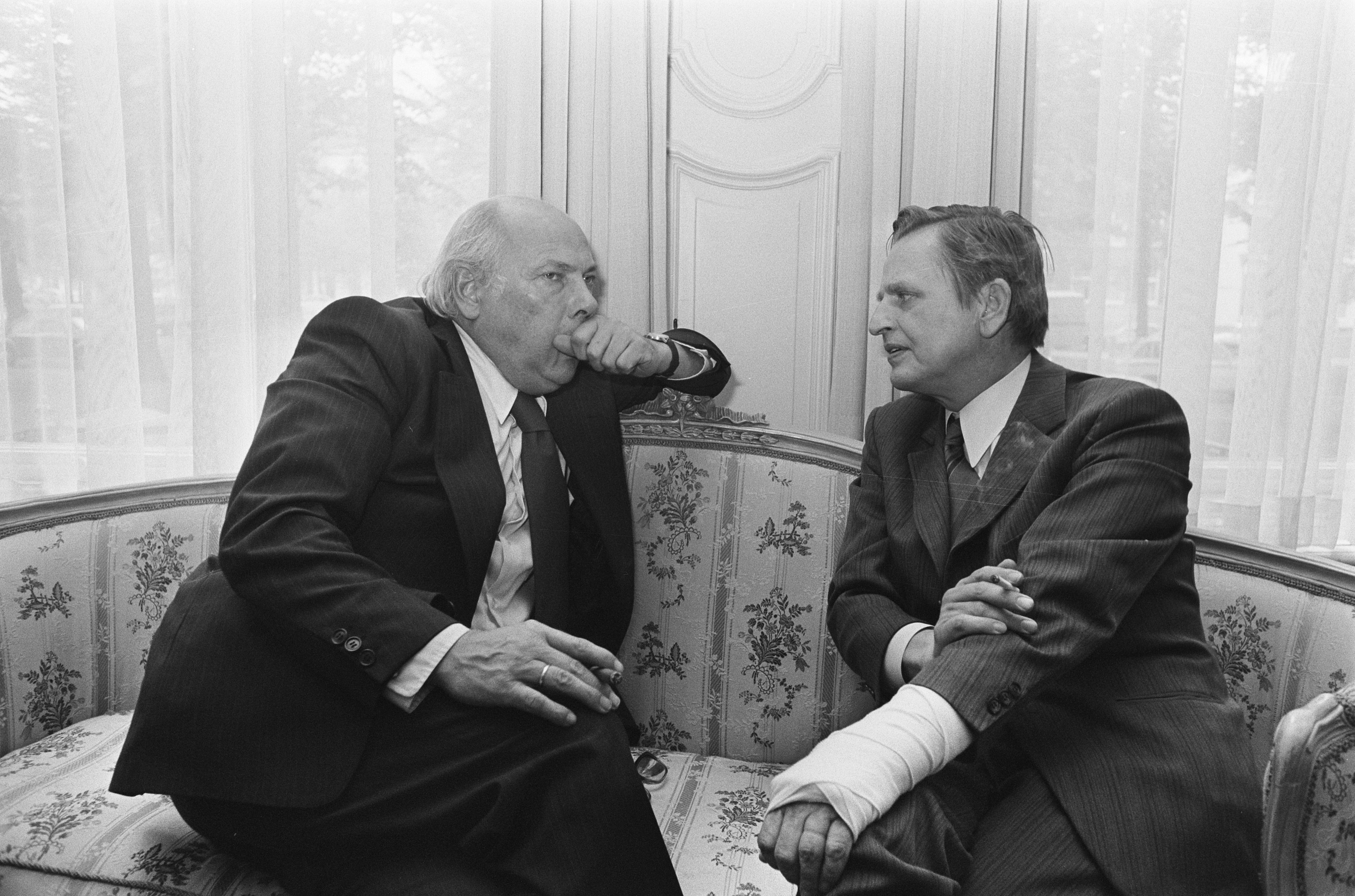
Prime Minister Joop den Uyl and Prime Minister of Sweden Olof Palme at the Ministry of General Affairs on 12 September 1974

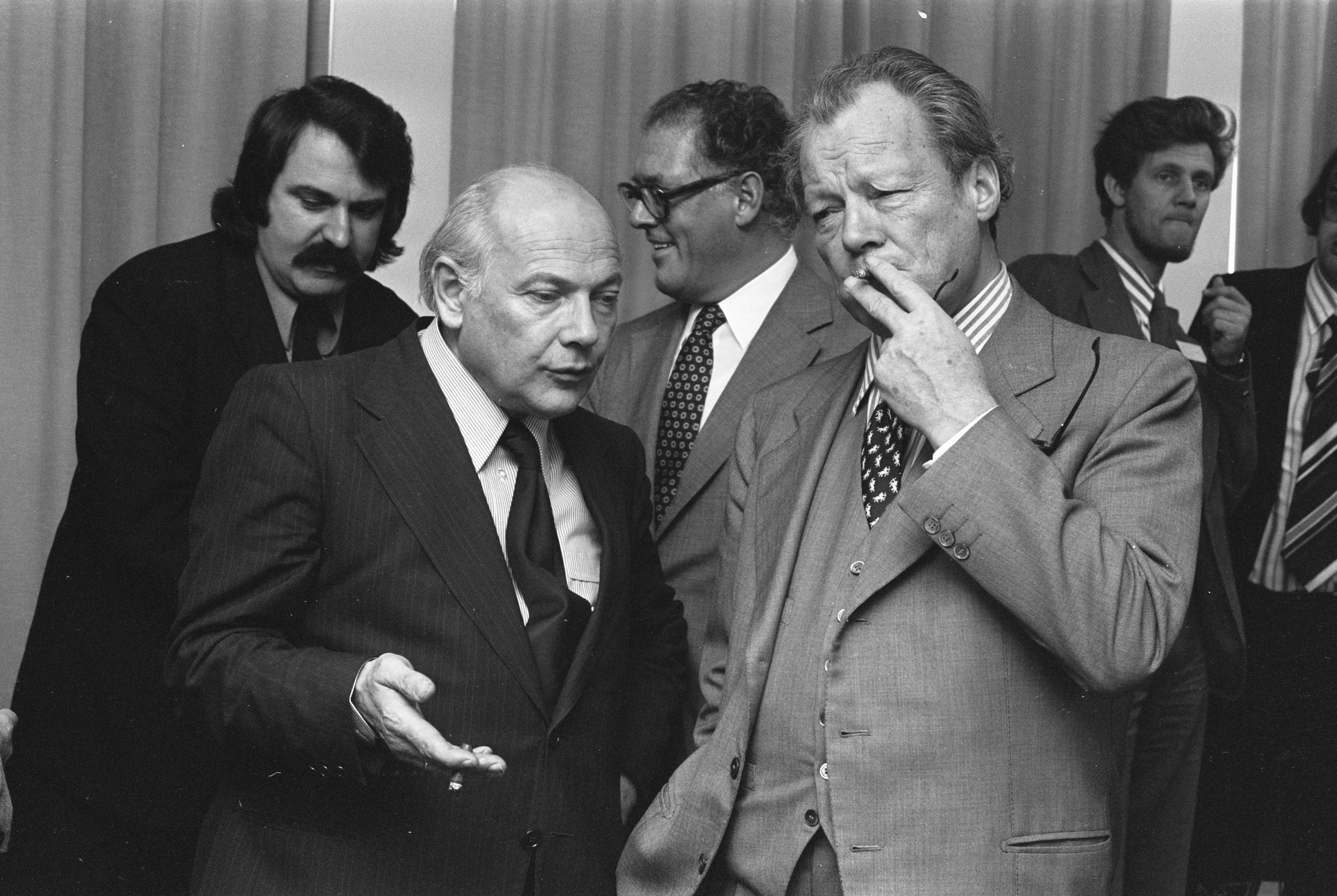
Prime Minister Joop den Uyl and former Chancellor of West Germany Willy Brandt at a Party of European Socialists conference in the Hague on 1 November 1974

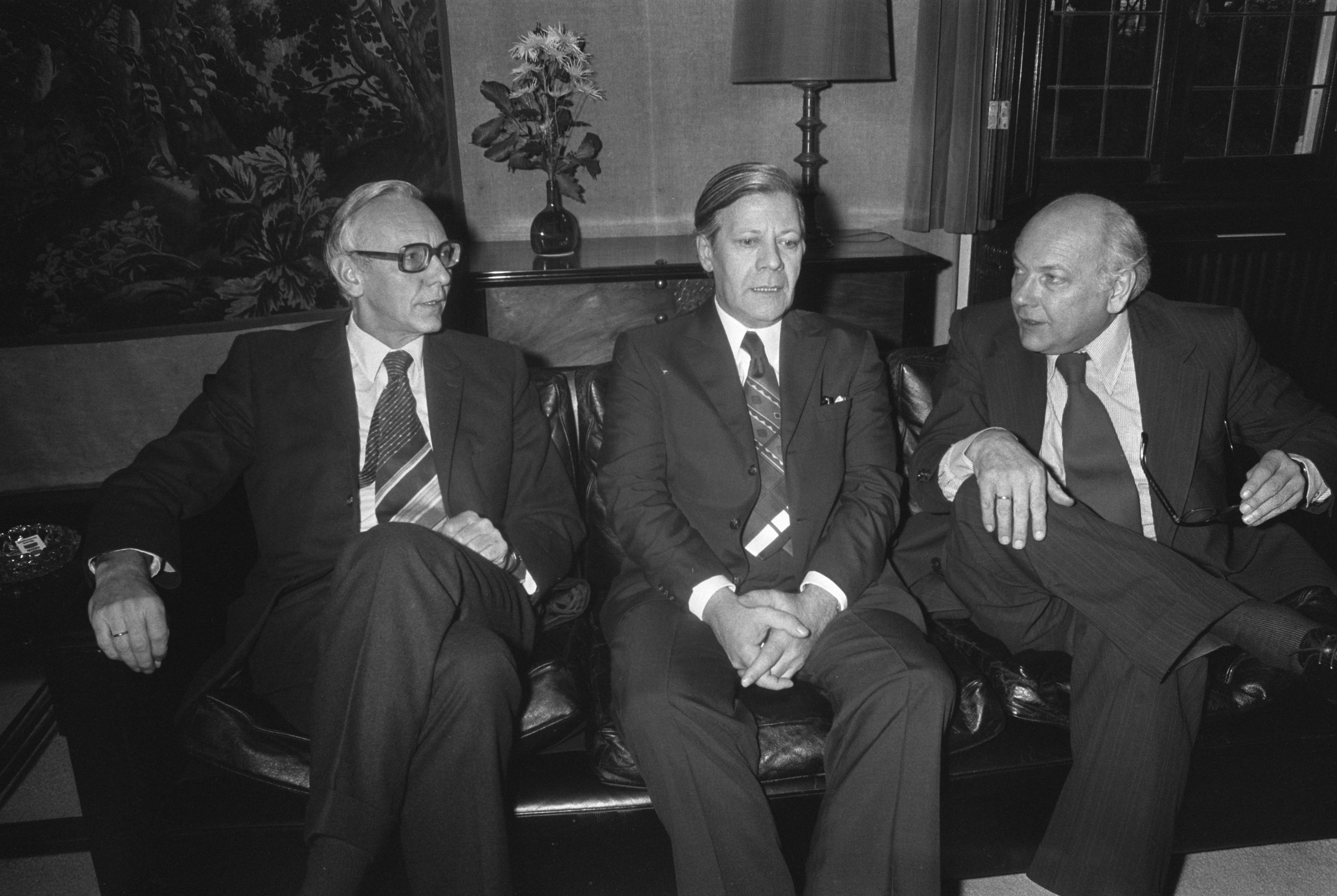
Minister Max van der Stoel, Chancellor of West Germany Helmut Schmidt and Prime Minister Joop den Uyl at the Catshuis on 2 November 1974

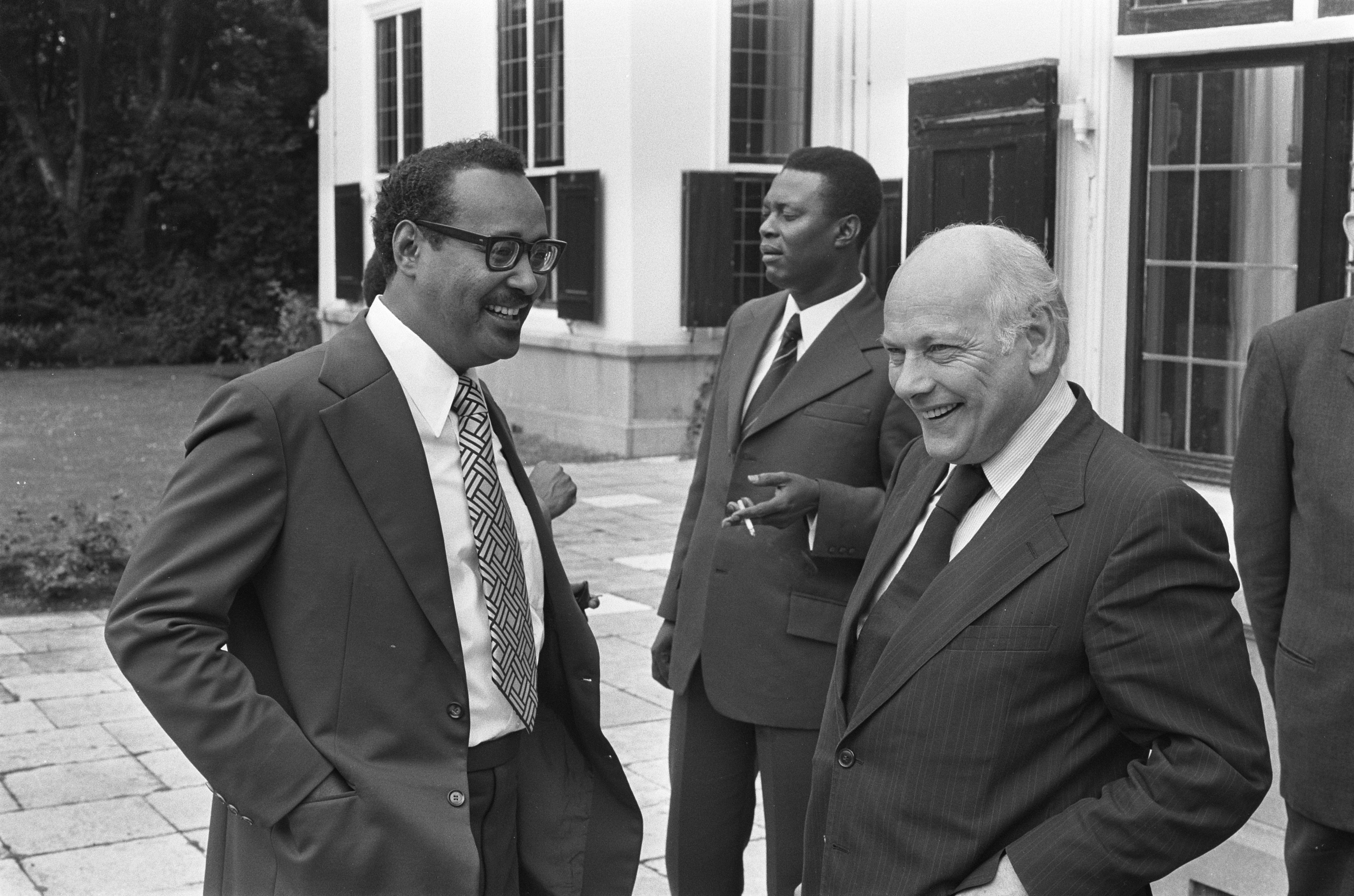
Prime Minister of Suriname Henck Arron and Prime Minister Joop den Uyl at the Catshuis on 25 June 1975

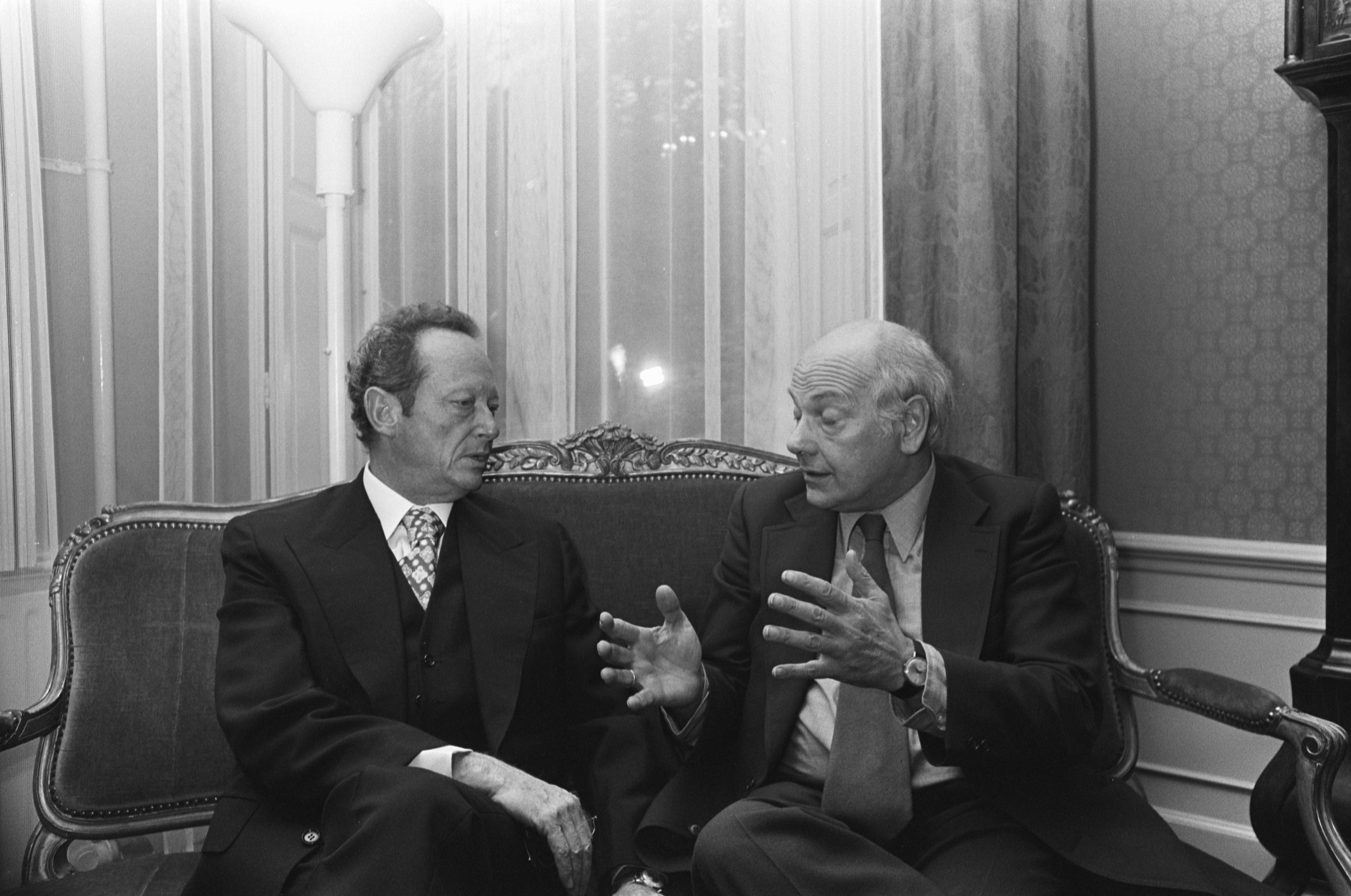
Israeli Minister of Foreign Affairs Yigal Allon and Prime Minister Joop den Uyl at the Ministry of General Affairs on 10 November 1975

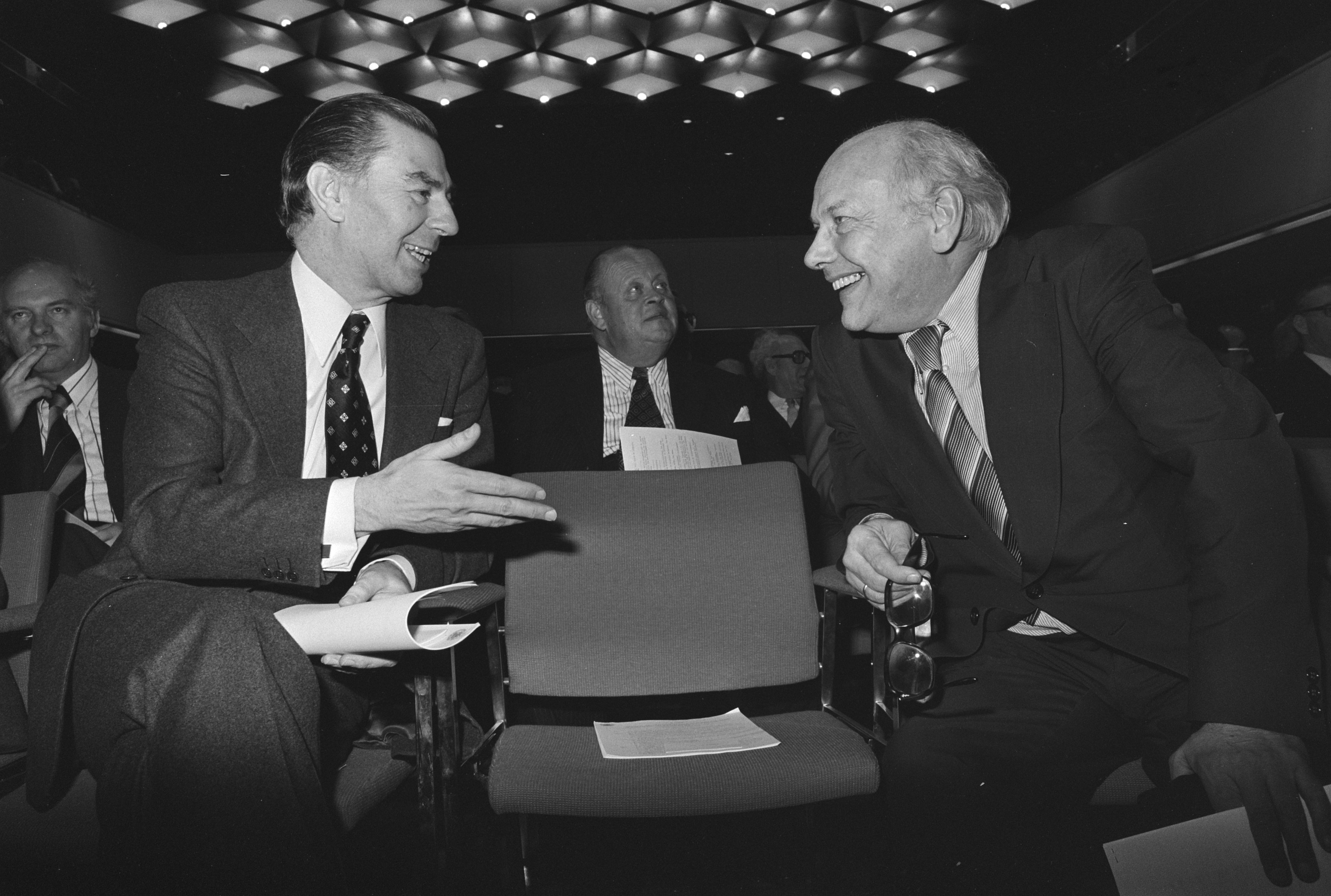
Prime Minister of Belgium Leo Tindemans and Prime Minister Joop den Uyl at a Benelux conference in The Hague on 23 March 1976

United States Secretary of State Henry Kissinger and Prime Minister Joop den Uyl at the Catshuis on 11 August 1976

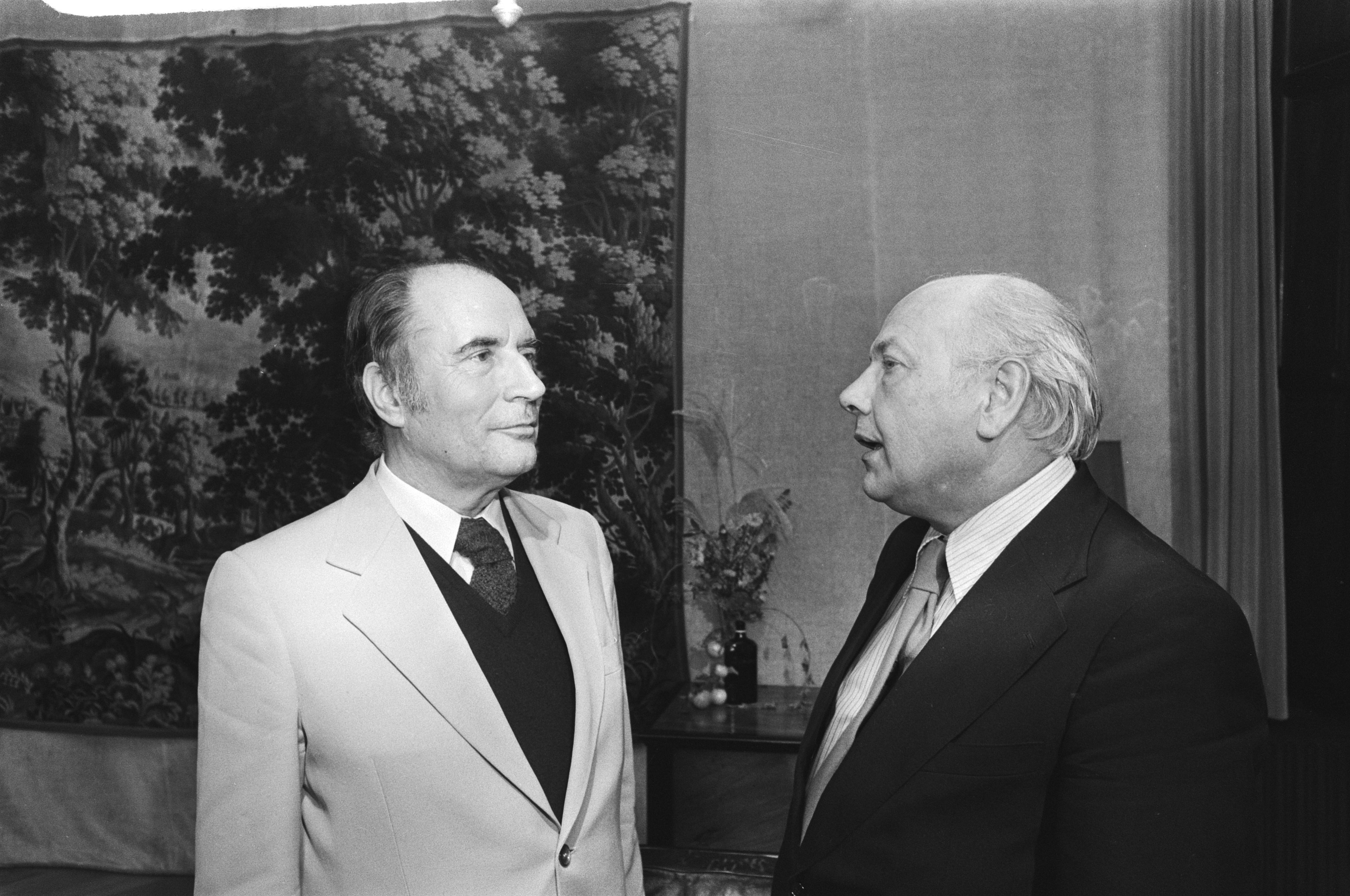
French Socialist Leader François Mitterrand and Prime Minister Joop den Uyl at the Catshuis on 28 September 1976

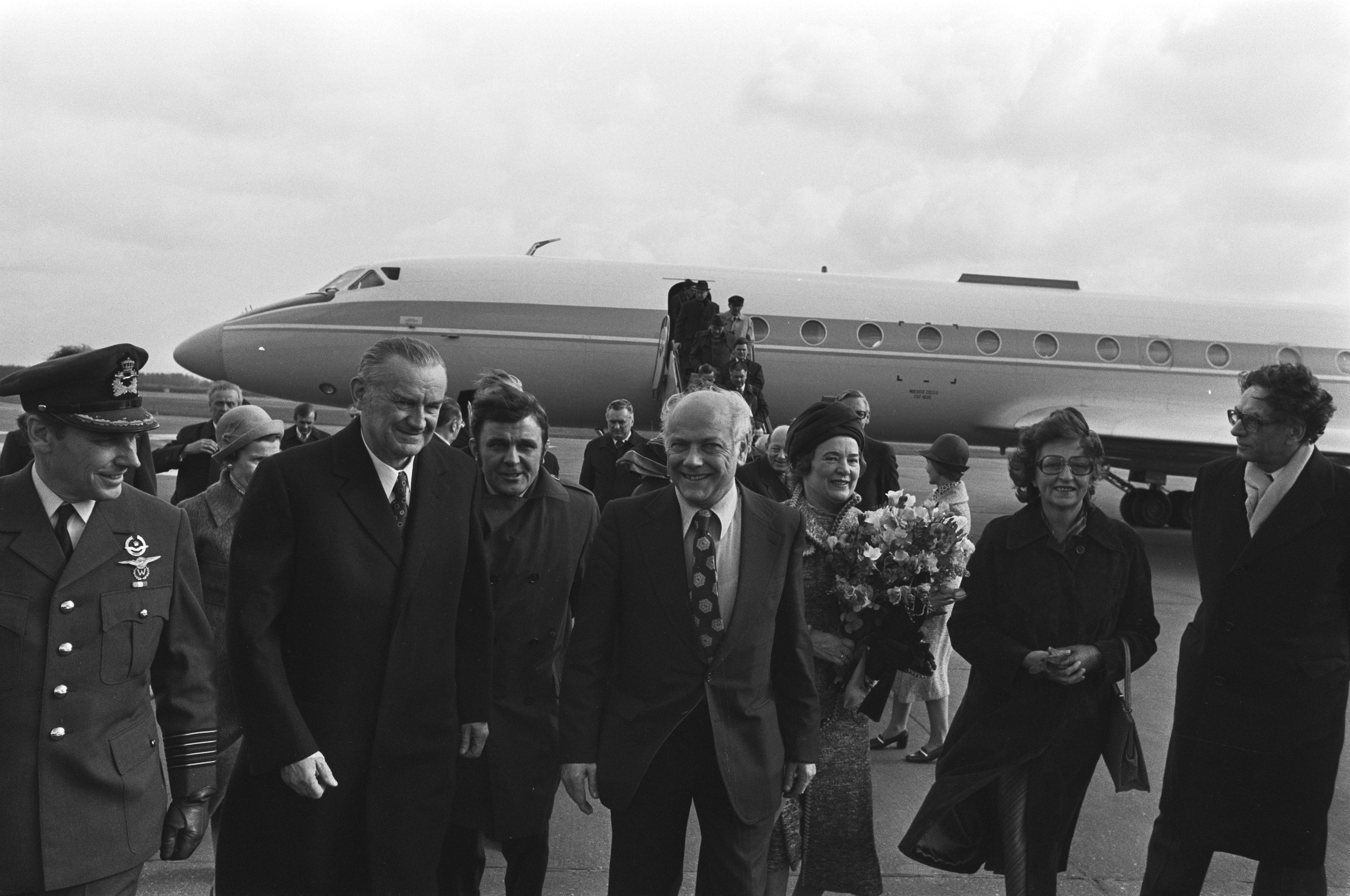
Prime Minister of Poland Piotr Jaroszewicz and Prime Minister Joop den Uyl at Ypenburg Airport on 14 March 1977

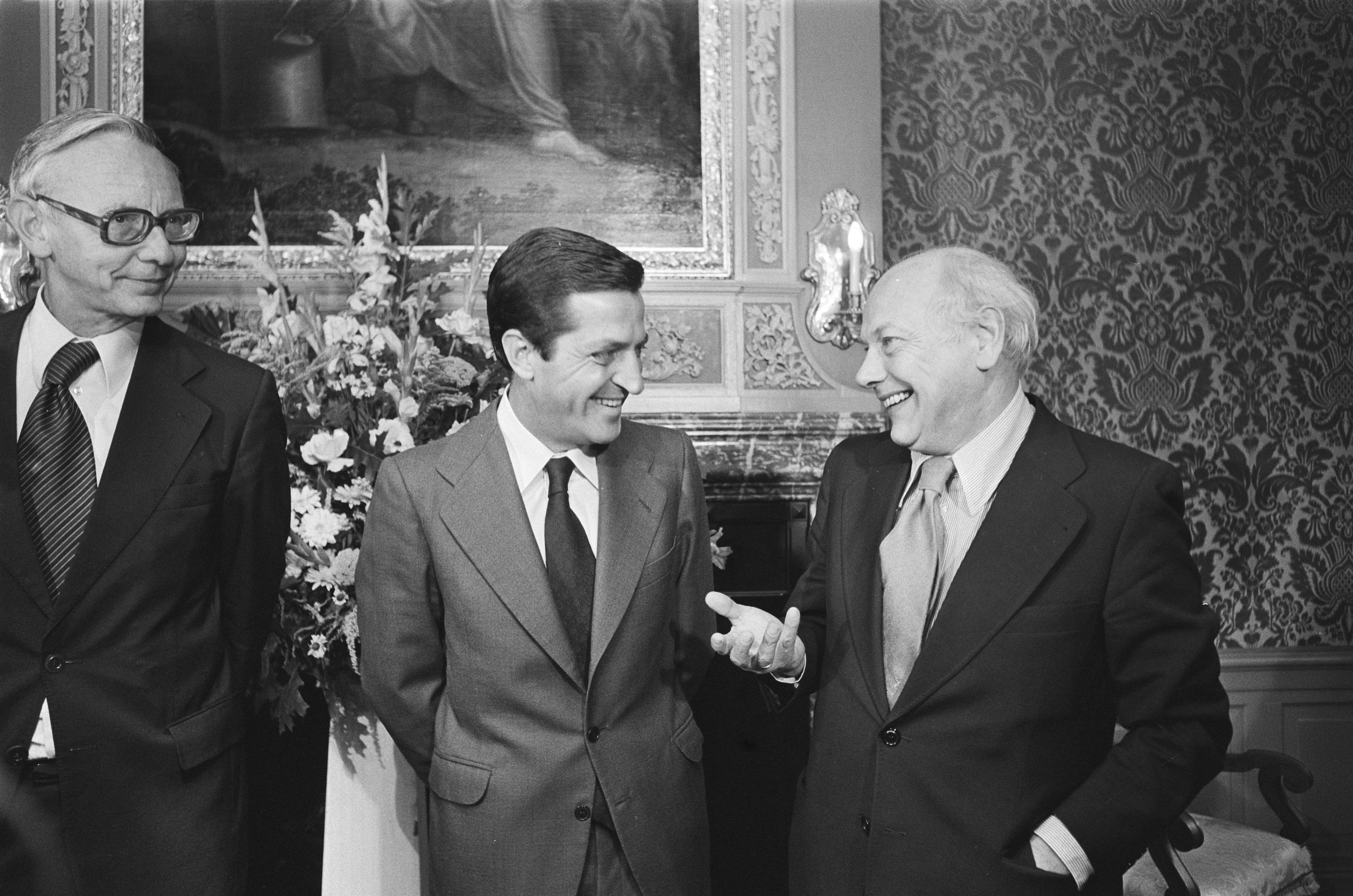
Minister Max van der Stoel, Prime Minister of Spain Adolfo Suárez and Prime Minister Joop den Uyl at the Catshuis on 29 August 1977

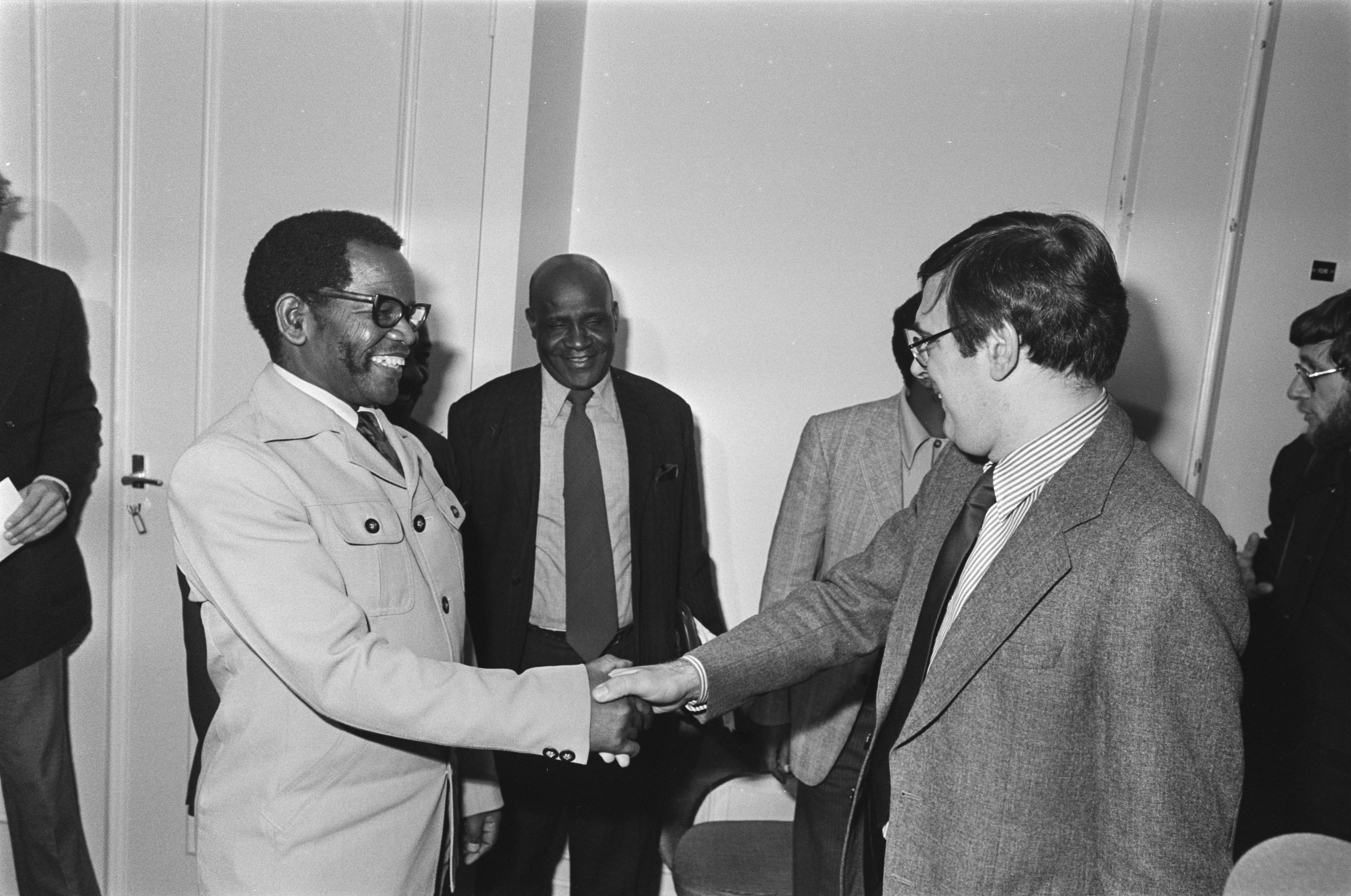
ANC Secretary-General Oliver Tambo, ANC Treasurer-General Thomas Nkobi and Minister Jan Pronk at the Ministry of Foreign Affairs on 5 October 1977

== Composition ==
=== Ministers ===
Title	Minister			Term of office	
Title	Image	Name	Party	Start	End
Prime Minister; Minister of General Affairs	Joop den Uyl	Joop den Uyl	PvdA	11 May 1973	19 December 1977
Deputy Prime Minister; Minister of Justice	Dries van Agt	Dries van Agt	KVP	11 May 1973	8 September 1977
Deputy Prime Minister; Minister of Justice	Gaius de Gaay Fortman	Gaius de Gaay Fortman	ARP	8 September 1977	19 December 1977
Minister of the Interior; Minister for Suriname and Netherlands Antilles Affairs (1973–1975); Minister for Netherlands Antilles Affairs (1975–1977)	Gaius de Gaay Fortman	Gaius de Gaay Fortman	ARP	11 May 1973	19 December 1977
Minister of Foreign Affairs	Max van der Stoel	Max van der Stoel	PvdA	11 May 1973	19 December 1977
Minister of Finance	Wim Duisenberg	Wim Duisenberg	PvdA	11 May 1973	19 December 1977
Minister of Economic Affairs	Ruud Lubbers	Ruud Lubbers	KVP	11 May 1973	19 December 1977
Minister of Defence	Henk Vredeling	Henk Vredeling	PvdA	11 May 1973	31 December 1976
Minister of Defence	Bram Stemerdink	Bram Stemerdink	PvdA	31 December 1976	19 December 1977
Minister of Health and Environment	Irene Vorrink	Irene Vorrink	PvdA	11 May 1973	19 December 1977
Minister of Social Affairs	Jaap Boersma	Jaap Boersma	ARP	11 May 1973	19 December 1977
Minister of Education and Sciences	Jos van Kemenade	Jos van Kemenade	PvdA	11 May 1973	19 December 1977
Minister of Transport and Water Management	Tjerk Westerterp	Tjerk Westerterp	KVP	11 May 1973	19 December 1977
Minister of Agriculture and Fisheries	Tiemen Brouwer	Tiemen Brouwer	KVP	11 May 1973	1 November 1973
Minister of Agriculture and Fisheries	Fons van der Stee	Fons van der Stee	KVP	1 November 1973	19 December 1977
Minister of Housing and Spatial Planning	Hans Gruijters	Hans Gruijters	D'66	11 May 1973	19 December 1977
Minister of Culture, Recreation and Social Work	Harry van Doorn	Harry van Doorn	PPR	11 May 1973	19 December 1977
Minister for Development Cooperation	Jan Pronk	Jan Pronk	PvdA	11 May 1973	19 December 1977
Minister for Science Policy	Boy Trip	Boy Trip	PPR	11 May 1973	19 December 1977

=== State secretaries ===
Title	State secretary			Term of office	
Title	Image	Name	Party	Start	End
State Secretary of the Interior	Wim Polak	Wim Polak	PvdA	11 May 1973	1 May 1977
State Secretary of Foreign Affairs	Laurens Jan Brinkhorst	Laurens Jan Brinkhorst	D'66	11 May 1973	8 September 1977
State Secretary of Foreign Affairs	Pieter Kooijmans	Pieter Kooijmans	ARP	11 May 1973	19 December 1977
State Secretary of Finance	Aar de Goede	Aar de Goede	D'66	11 May 1973	19 December 1977
State Secretary of Finance	Fons van der Stee	Fons van der Stee	KVP	11 May 1973	1 November 1973
State Secretary of Finance	Martin van Rooijen	Martin van Rooijen	KVP	21 December 1973	14 October 1977
State Secretary of Justice	Jan Glastra van Loon	Jan Glastra van Loon	D'66	13 June 1973	27 May 1975
State Secretary of Justice	Henk Zeevalking	Henk Zeevalking	D'66	6 June 1975	8 September 1977
State Secretary of Economic Affairs	Ted Hazekamp	Ted Hazekamp	KVP	11 May 1973	19 December 1977
State Secretary of Defence	Joep Mommersteeg	Joep Mommersteeg	KVP	11 May 1973	1 March 1974
State Secretary of Defence	Cees van Lent	Cees van Lent	KVP	11 March 1974	19 December 1977
State Secretary of Defence	Bram Stemerdink	Bram Stemerdink	PvdA	11 May 1973	1 January 1977
State Secretary of Health and Environment	Jo Hendriks	Jo Hendriks	KVP	11 May 1973	19 December 1977
State Secretary of Social Affairs	Jan Mertens	Jan Mertens	KVP	11 May 1973	19 December 1977
State Secretary of Education and Sciences	Ger Klein	Ger Klein	PvdA	11 May 1973	8 September 1977
State Secretary of Education and Sciences	Antoon Veerman	Antoon Veerman	ARP	11 May 1973	1 September 1975
State Secretary of Education and Sciences	Klaas de Jong Ozn.	Klaas de Jong Ozn.	ARP	1 September 1975	19 December 1977
State Secretary of Transport and Water Management	Michel van Hulten	Michel van Hulten	PPR	11 May 1973	19 December 1977
State Secretary of Housing and Spatial Planning	Jan Schaefer	Jan Schaefer	PvdA	11 May 1973	8 September 1977
State Secretary of Housing and Spatial Planning	Marcel van Dam	Marcel van Dam	PvdA	11 May 1973	8 September 1977
State Secretary of Culture, Recreation and Social Work	Wim Meijer	Wim Meijer	PvdA	11 May 1973	8 September 1977

== See also ==
- Den Uyl shadow cabinet
