= Jan van Houwelingen =

Jan van Houwelingen may refer to:

- Jan van Houwelingen (cyclist) (born 1955), Dutch cyclist
- Jan van Houwelingen (politician) (1939–2013), Dutch politician
