= Bram Stemerdink =

Dutch politician (born 1936)

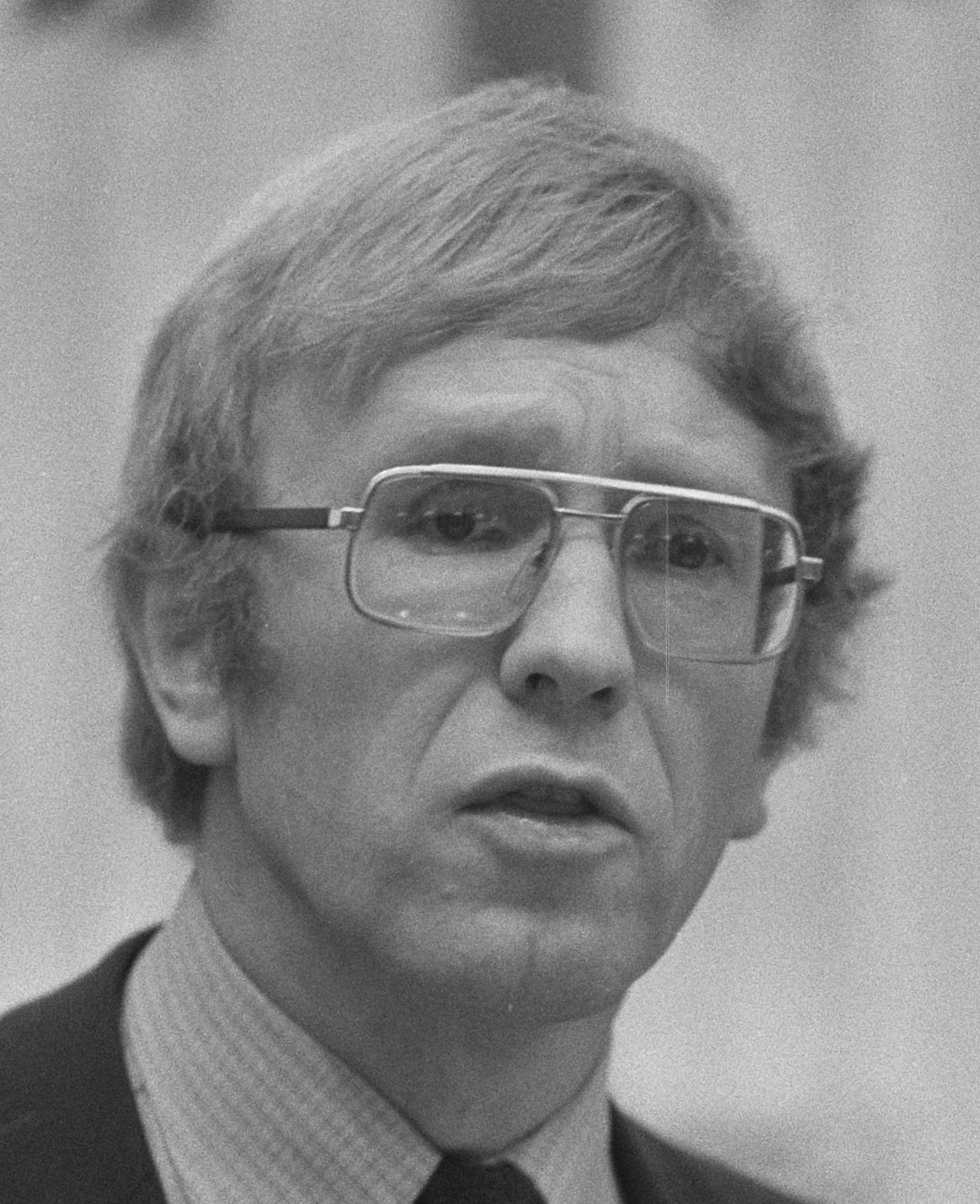
- Stemerdink in 1979

Minister of Defence
- In office 31 December 1976 – 19 December 1977
- Prime Minister: Joop den Uyl
- Preceded by: Henk Vredeling
- Succeeded by: Roelof Kruisinga

State Secretary for Defence
- In office 11 September 1981 – 29 May 1982 Serving with Jan van Houwelingen
- Prime Minister: Dries van Agt
- Preceded by: Wim van Eekelen
- Succeeded by: Jan van Houwelingen
- In office 11 May 1973 – 1 January 1977 Serving with Joep Mommersteeg (1973–1974); Cees van Lent (1974–1977)
- Prime Minister: Joop den Uyl
- Preceded by: Adri van Es
- Succeeded by: Cees van Lent; Wim van Eekelen

Member of the House of Representatives
- In office 16 September 1982 – 17 May 1994
- In office 16 January 1978 – 11 September 1981
- In office 14 June 1977 – 14 September 1977
- In office 25 August 1970 – 11 May 1973
- Parliamentary group: Labour Party

Personal details
- Born: Abraham Stemerdink; 6 March 1936 (age 90) Winterswijk, Netherlands
- Party: Labour Party (from 1966)
- Spouse: Elly Stemerdink (m. 1962)
- Children: 1
- Education: Royal Military Academy; Leiden University (Bachelor of Laws, Master of Laws)
- Occupation: Politician · Army officer · Jurist · Lawyer · Judge · Nonprofit director · Historian · Television presenter · Author

Military service
- Allegiance: Netherlands
- Branch/service: Royal Netherlands Army
- Years of service: 1955–1956 (Conscription); 1956–1970 (Active duty); 1970–1973 (Reserve)
- Rank: Captain
- Unit: Regiment van Heutsz; Justice Corps
- Battles/wars: Cold War

Abraham "Bram" Stemerdink (born 6 March 1936) is a retired Dutch politician of the Labour Party (PvdA) and army officer.

Stemerdink was conscripted in the Royal Netherlands Army serving as a corporal from July 1955 until August 1956 and attended the Royal Military Academy and was commissioned as an officer in August 1956 serving in the cavalry Regiment van Heutsz as a captain from August 1956 until August 1970. Stemerdink was wounded in action after losing an eye from an explosion during a training exercise, after his recovery he studied law at the Leiden University and he subsequently returned to active service a military lawyer and judge for the military justice system of the Royal Netherlands Army. Stemerdink served on the Provincial-Council of North Holland from June 1970 until August 1971 and served on the Municipal Council of 's-Hertogenbosch from 1 September 1970 until 11 May 1973.

Stemerdink became a Member of the House of Representatives after the resignation of Joan Willems, taking office on 25 August 1970 serving as a frontbencher chairing the special parliamentary committee for Military Justice Reform and spokesperson for Defence and Veterans' affairs. After the election of 1972 Stemerdink was appointed as State Secretary for Defence in the Cabinet Den Uyl, taking office on 11 May 1973. Stemerdink was appointed as Minister of Defence following the appointment of Henk Vredeling as the next European Commissioner from the Netherlands, taking office on 1 January 1977. The Cabinet Den Uyl fell on 22 March 1977 after four years of tensions in the coalition and continued to serve in a demissionary capacity. After the election of 1977 Stemerdink returned as a Member of the House of Representatives, taking office on 14 June 1977 but he was still serving in the cabinet and because of dualism customs in the constitutional convention of Dutch politics he couldn't serve a dual mandate he subsequently resigned as a Member of the House of Representatives on 14 September 1977. The Cabinet Den Uyl was replaced by the Cabinet Van Agt-Wiegel following the cabinet formation of 1977 on 19 December 1977 and he subsequently returned as Member of the House of Representatives after the resignation of Adriaan van Mierlo, taking office on 16 January 1978 serving as a frontbencher and spokesperson for Defence and Veterans' affairs. After the election of 1981 Stemerdink was again appointed as State Secretary for Defence in the Cabinet Van Agt II, taking office on 11 September 1981. The Cabinet Van Agt II fell just seven months into its term on 12 May 1982 after months of tensions in the coalition and continued to serve in a demissionary capacity until the first cabinet formation of 1982 when it was replaced by the caretaker Cabinet Van Agt III on 29 May 1982. After the election of 1982 Stemerdink once again returned as a Member of the House of Representatives, taking office on 16 September 1982 serving as a frontbencher chairing the parliamentary committee for European Affairs and spokesperson for Defence, European Affairs, NATO, Veterans' affairs and spokesperson for Foreign Affairs. After the election of 1989 Stemerdink was not giving a cabinet post in the new Cabinet Lubbers III and continued serving in the House of Representatives. In October 1993 Stemerdink announced his retirement from national politics and that he wouldn't stand for the election of 1994 and continued to serve until the end of the parliamentary term on 17 May 1994.

Stemerdink retired after spending 23 years in national politics and became active in the public sector and occupied numerous seats as a nonprofit director on several boards of directors and supervisory boards (Overloon War Museum, Institute for Multiparty Democracy, ProDemos and the International Institute of Social History) and served on several state commissions and councils on behalf of the government (Probation Agency, Public Pension Funds APB, National Committee for 4 and 5 May, Custodial Institutions Agency and the Dutch Safety Board).

== Biography ==
Bram Stemerdink was initially a captain in the Army, but lost an eye in a military exercise, after which he studied law in Leiden. Then he became secretary of the Council of War, member of the North Brabant province government and councilor for the city 's-Hertogenbosch and since 1970 Member of Parliament (MP). In the Den Uyl administration he was Secretary of State of Defence from 1973 and from 1 January to 19 December 1977 Minister of Defence. In the second van Agt administration he was secretary of state again. In the periods 1978–1981 and 1982–1994 he was an MP. Stemerdink was an independent politician with historical interest. He was an activist for the preservation of the old parliament hall. He has been a respected radio commentator for many years. He is also chairman of the foundation National War and Resistance in Overloon (the Netherlands).

== Decorations ==
Military decorations
Ribbon bar	Decoration	Country	Date	Comment
	Onderscheidingsteken voor Langdurige, Eerlijke en Trouwe Dienst	Netherlands	30 December 1973	Honorable discharge
Honours
Ribbon bar	Honour	Country	Date	Comment
	Knight of the Order of the Netherlands Lion	Netherlands	11 April 1978	
	Commander of the Order of Leopold II	Belgium	12 February 1982	
	Commander of the Order of Orange-Nassau	Netherlands	9 December 1982	

Political offices
Preceded by Adri van Es	State Secretary for Defence; 1973–1977; 1981–1982; Served alongside: Joep Mommersteeg (1973–1974); Cees van Lent (1974–1977); Jan van Houwelingen (1981–1982)	Succeeded by Wim van Eekelen
Preceded by Wim van Eekelen	State Secretary for Defence; 1973–1977; 1981–1982; Served alongside: Joep Mommersteeg (1973–1974); Cees van Lent (1974–1977); Jan van Houwelingen (1981–1982)	Succeeded by Jan van Houwelingen
Preceded by Henk Vredeling	Minister of Defence; 1976–1977	Succeeded by Roelof Kruisinga
Non-profit organization positions
Unknown	Chairman of the Supervisory board of the Overloon War Museum; 1997–2008	Succeeded by Frank van Beers
