= Joep Mommersteeg =

Dutch politician (1917–1991)

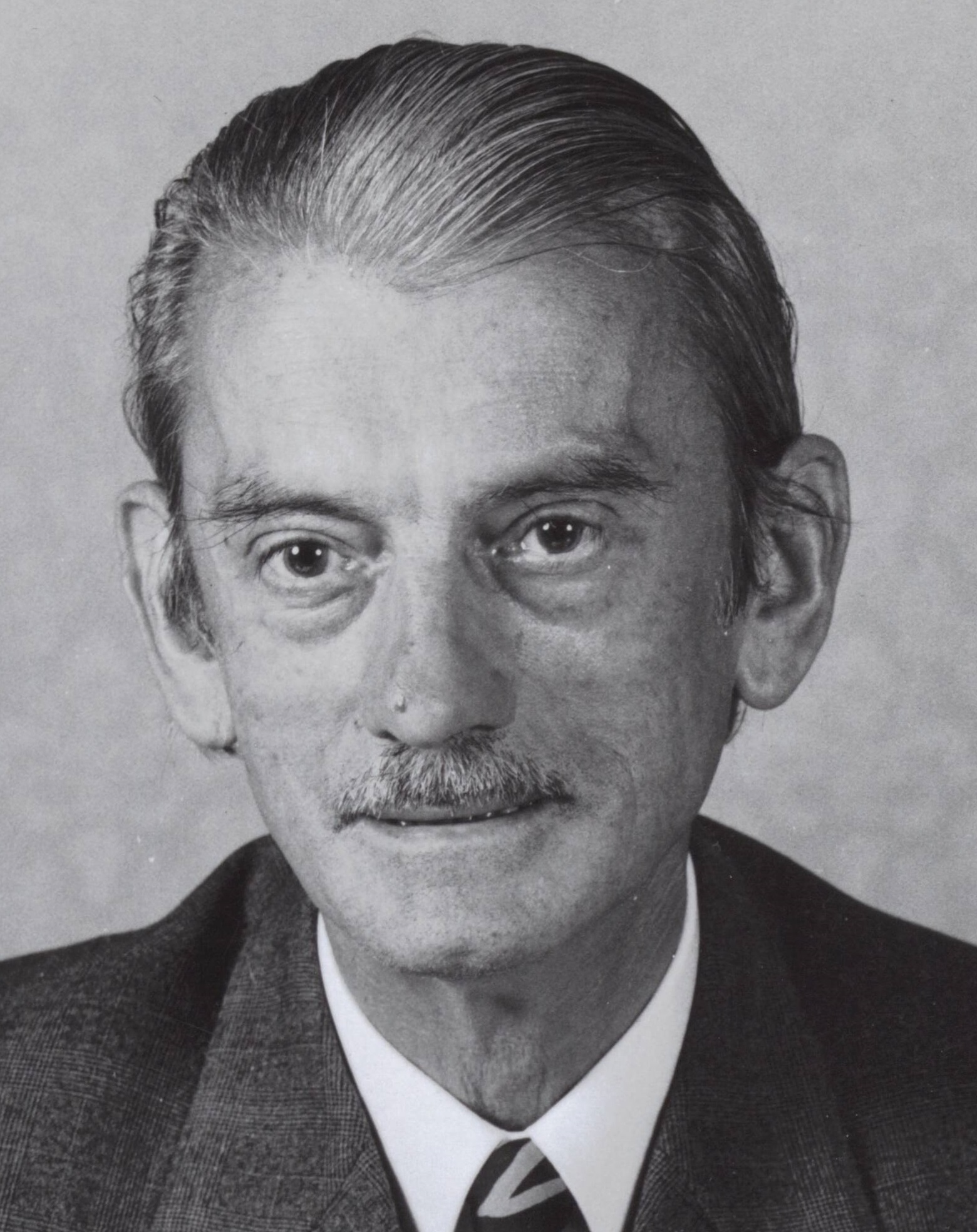
- Mommersteeg in 1973

State Secretary for Defence
- In office 11 May 1973 – 1 March 1974 Serving with Bram Stemerdink
- Prime Minister: Joop den Uyl
- Minister: Henk Vredeling
- Preceded by: Adri van Es
- Succeeded by: Cees van Lent

Member of the House of Representatives
- In office 5 June 1963 – 11 May 1973
- In office 18 May 1976 – 8 June 1977
- In office 22 December 1977 – 1 April 1982

Member of the European Parliament
- In office 22 September 1971 – 11 May 1973
- In office 15 February 1982 – 24 July 1984

Personal details
- Born: Joseph Antonius Mommersteeg; 6 March 1917 's-Hertogenbosch, Netherlands
- Died: 21 September 1991 (aged 74) Amsterdam, Netherlands
- Party: Christian Democratic Appeal (from 1980)
- Other political affiliations: Black Front (1940–1941); Catholic People's Party (until 1980)
- Occupation: Politician

Joseph Antonius "Joep" Mommersteeg (6 March 1917 – 21 September 1991 ) was a Dutch politician of the defunct Catholic People's Party (KVP) party, later the Christian Democratic Appeal (CDA) party.

Political offices
Preceded by Adri van Es	State Secretary for Defence; 1973–1975	Succeeded by Cees van Lent
