= Wim van Eekelen =

Dutch politician and diplomat (1931–2025)

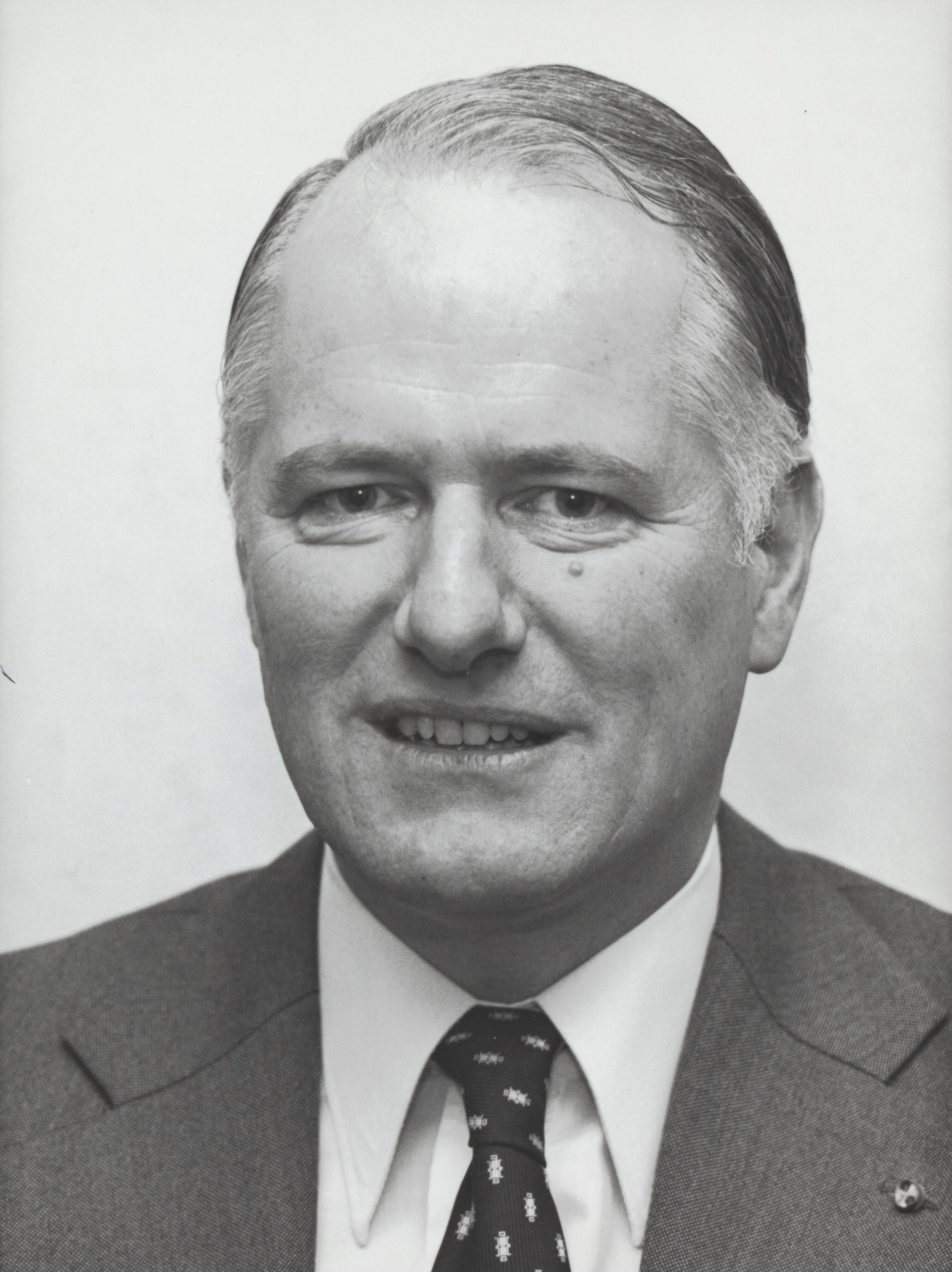
- Van Eekelen in 1978

Member of the Senate
- In office 13 June 1995 – 10 June 2003
- Parliamentary group: People's Party for Freedom and Democracy

Secretary General of the Western European Union
- In office 15 May 1989 – 15 November 1994
- Preceded by: Alfred Cahen
- Succeeded by: José Cutileiro

Minister of Defence
- In office 14 July 1986 – 6 September 1988
- Prime Minister: Ruud Lubbers
- Preceded by: Job de Ruiter
- Succeeded by: Piet Bukman (Ad interim)

State Secretary for Foreign Affairs
- In office 5 November 1982 – 14 July 1986
- Prime Minister: Ruud Lubbers
- Preceded by: Hans van den Broek
- Succeeded by: René van der Linden

State Secretary for Defence
- In office 20 January 1978 – 11 September 1981 Serving with Cees van Lent
- Prime Minister: Dries van Agt
- Preceded by: Cees van Lent
- Succeeded by: Bram Stemerdink; Jan van Houwelingen

Member of the House of Representatives
- In office 3 June 1986 – 14 July 1986
- In office 25 August 1981 – 5 November 1982
- In office 8 June 1977 – 20 January 1978
- Parliamentary group: People's Party for Freedom and Democracy

Personal details
- Born: Willem Frederik van Eekelen; 5 February 1931 Utrecht, Netherlands
- Died: 25 June 2025 (aged 94) The Hague, Netherlands
- Party: People's Party for Freedom and Democracy (from 1955)
- Education: Utrecht University (Bachelor of Laws, Master of Laws, Doctor of Philosophy); Princeton University (A.B.)
- Occupation: Politician · Diplomat · Civil servant · Jurist · Political scientist · Researcher · Political consultant · Corporate director · Nonprofit director · Lobbyist · Author

Military service
- Allegiance: Netherlands
- Branch/service: Royal Netherlands Army
- Years of service: 1956–1957 (Conscription); 1957–1961 (Reserve)
- Rank: Lieutenant
- Unit: Regiment Huzaren van Boreel
- Battles/wars: Cold War

Willem Frederik van Eekelen (5 February 1931 – 25 June 2025) was a Dutch politician, diplomat and political scientist.

== Early life and education ==
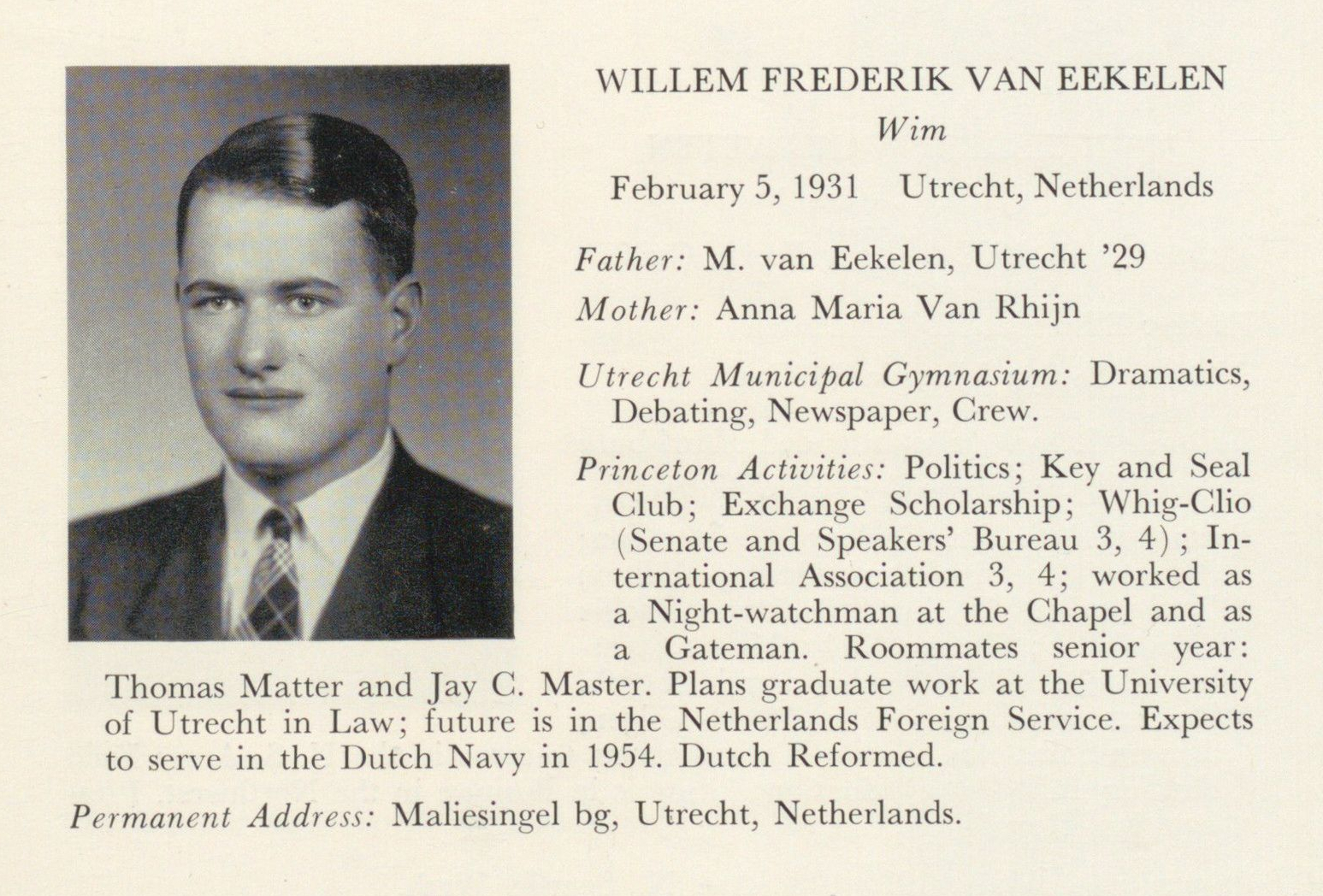
Van Eekelen in the Princeton University yearbook, 1952

Van Eekelen attended a Gymnasium in Utrecht from June 1943 until June 1949. He applied to the Utrecht University in June 1949, majoring in Law and obtaining a Bachelor of Laws degree in July 1951. He attended Princeton University and graduated in 1952 with an A.B. in politics after completing a senior thesis titled "The Marshall Plan and Its Significance for the Netherlands." He graduated with a Master of Laws degree from the University of Utrecht in November 1954.

Van Eekelen was conscripted in the Royal Netherlands Army, and served in the cavalry Regiment Huzaren van Boreel as a lieutenant from July 1956 until August 1957.

He worked as a civil servant for the Ministry of Foreign Affairs from September 1957 until June 1977 for the Diplomatic service from September 1957 until May 1974 as an attaché in New Delhi, India from September 1957 until January 1960, and in London, England from January 1960 until February 1964.

Van Eekelen returned to the Utrecht University in February 1964 for postgraduate education, where he worked as a researcher and received a doctorate as a Doctor of Philosophy in political science on 18 November 1964.

== Career ==
Van Eekelen worked as attaché in Accra, Ghana from November 1964 until October 1966, as a senior attaché for the permanent representative of the Netherlands to the European Union from October 1966 until May 1971, and as a consul for the European Economic Community from May 1971 until August 1974. He worked as director-general for the department of Atlantic Cooperation and Security Affairs of the Ministry of Foreign Affairs from August 1974 to June 1977.

Van Eekelen was elected as a member of the House of Representatives after the election of 1977, taking office on 8 June 1977. Following the cabinet formation of 1977, he was appointed state secretary for defence in the Cabinet Van Agt–Wiegel, taking office on 20 January 1978. After the election of 1981, he returned as a member of the House of Representatives, taking office on 25 August 1981. The Cabinet Van Agt–Wiegel was replaced by the Cabinet Van Agt II following the cabinet formation of 1981 on 11 September 1981. After the election of 1982, Van Eekelen was appointed state secretary for foreign affairs in the Cabinet Lubbers I, taking office on 5 November 1982. After the election of 1986, he again returned as a member of the House of Representatives, taking office on 3 June 1986. Following the cabinet formation of 1986, he was appointed minister of defence in the Cabinet Lubbers II, taking office on 14 July 1986.

On 6 September 1988, Van Eekelen resigned following the conclusions of a parliamentary inquiry report into a passport fraud investigation that was mishandled by him during the time he served as state secretary for foreign affairs in the previous cabinet, his successor as state secretary for foreign affairs René van der Linden subsequently resigned on 9 September 1988.

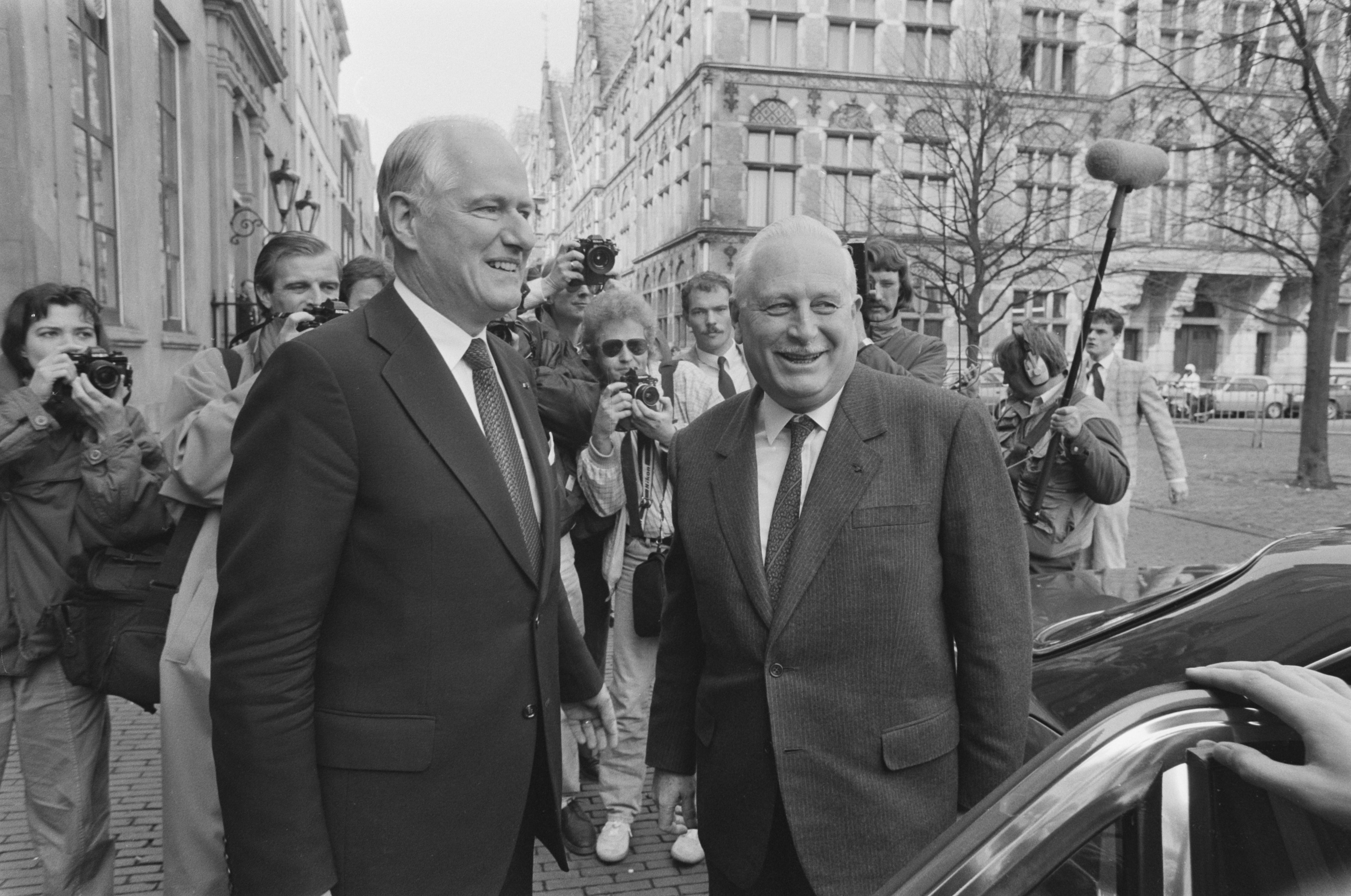
Minister of Defence Wim van Eekelen and Minister of Defence of France André Giraud at the Ministry of Defence on 13 April 1987

Van Eekelen remained active in national politics. In April 1989, he was nominated as secretary general of the Western European Union, serving from 15 May 1989 until 15 November 1994. He was elected as a member of the Senate after the Senate election of 1995, taking office on 13 June 1995, serving as a frontbencher chairing several parliamentary committees.

In January 2003, Van Eekelen announced his retirement from national politics and that he would not stand for the Senate election of 2003. He continued to serve until the end of the parliamentary term on 10 June 2003.

== After retirement ==
Van Eekelen retired after spending 26 years in national politics. He became active in the private sector and public sector. He occupied numerous seats as a corporate director and nonprofit director on several boards of directors and supervisory boards (Institute for Multiparty Democracy, Achmea, Netherlands Atlantic Association, Transnational Institute, Carnegie Foundation and the Institute of International Relations Clingendael). He also served as a diplomat and lobbyist for several economic delegations on behalf of the government, and as an advocate and lobbyist for Democracy, NATO and European integration.

Van Eekelen was known for his abilities as a negotiator and consensus builder. He continued to comment on political affairs in his later years, and held the distinction as the only Dutchman to have served as secretary general of the Western European Union.

Van Eekelen died on 25 June 2025, at the age of 94.

== Decorations ==
Honours
| Ribbon bar | Honour | Country | Date | Comment |
|---|---|---|---|---|
| | Grand Cross of the Order of Merit | Germany | 12 October 1984 | |
| | Grand Officer of the Order of Leopold II | Belgium | 15 September 1986 | |
| | Grand Officer of the Legion of Honour | France | 17 February 1987 | |
| | Grand Officer of the Order of Orange-Nassau | Netherlands | 10 December 1988 | |
| | Commander of the Order of the Netherlands Lion | Netherlands | 20 November 1994 | Elevated from Knight (26 October 1981) |
| | Commander's Cross of the Order of Merit | Poland | 6 May 1998 | |
| | Commander of the Order of the Star | Romania | 13 June 2018 | |

Political offices
| Preceded by Cees van Lent | State Secretary for Defence; 1978–1981; Served alongside: Cees van Lent | Succeeded by Bram Stemerdink |
| Preceded by Cees van Lent | State Secretary for Defence; 1978–1981; Served alongside: Cees van Lent | Succeeded by Jan van Houwelingen |
| Preceded by Hans van den Broek | State Secretary for Foreign Affairs; 1982–1986 | Succeeded by René van der Linden |
| Preceded by Job de Ruiter | Minister of Defence; 1986–1988 | Succeeded by Piet Bukman; Ad interim |
Civic offices
| Unknown | Director-General of the Department for Atlantic Cooperation and Security Affairs of the Ministry of Foreign Affairs; 1974–1977 | Unknown |
Diplomatic posts
| Preceded by Alfred Cahen | Secretary General of the Western European Union; 1989–1994 | Succeeded by José Cutileiro |
