= Jan van Houwelingen (politician) =

Dutch politician (1939–2013)

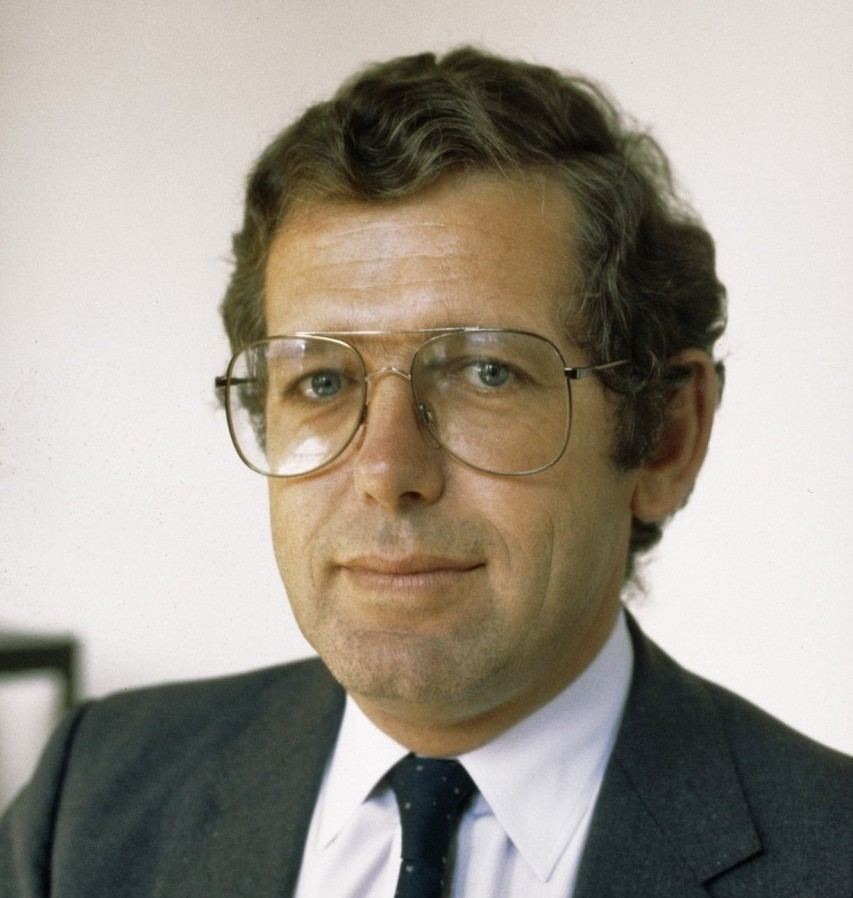
- Jan van Houwelingen in 1981

Mayor of Haarlemmermeer
- In office 1 June 1994 – 1 January 2003
- Preceded by: Arie Lems (Ad interim)
- Succeeded by: Fons Hertog

State Secretary for Defence
- In office 14 September 1981 – 7 November 1989 Serving with See list: Bram Stemerdink (1981–1982) Charl Schwietert (1982) Willem Hoekzema (1982–1986)
- Prime Minister: Dries van Agt (1981–1982); Ruud Lubbers (1982–1989)
- Preceded by: Cees van Lent; Wim van Eekelen
- Succeeded by: Berend-Jan van Voorst tot Voorst

Member of the House of Representatives
- In office 14 September 1989 – 17 May 1994
- In office 3 June 1986 – 14 July 1986
- In office 16 September 1982 – 5 November 1982
- In office 7 March 1973 – 14 September 1981
- Parliamentary group: Christian Democratic Appeal (1980–1994); Anti-Revolutionary Party (1973–1980)

Personal details
- Born: Jan van Houwelingen; 8 December 1937 Leerdam, Netherlands
- Died: 17 March 2013 (aged 75) Cruquius, Netherlands
- Party: Christian Democratic Appeal (from 1980)
- Other political affiliations: Anti-Revolutionary Party (until 1980)
- Children: 4 children
- Education: Utrecht University (Bachelor of Science)
- Occupation: Politician · Chemist · Researcher · Nonprofit director

Military service
- Allegiance: Netherlands
- Branch/service: Royal Netherlands Army
- Years of service: 1964–1966 (Conscription); 1966–1970 (Reserve)
- Rank: Second lieutenant
- Unit: Regiment Huzaren van Sytzama
- Battles/wars: Cold War

Jan van Houwelingen (8 December 1937 – 17 March 2013) was a Dutch politician of the defunct Anti-Revolutionary Party (ARP) later the Christian Democratic Appeal (CDA) party and chemist.

Van Houwelingen applied at the Utrecht University in June 1962 majoring in Chemistry and obtaining a Bachelor of Science degree in July 1964. Van Houwelingen served in the Royal Netherlands Army as a second lieutenant from November 1964 until November 1966. Van Houwelingen worked as a chemist and researcher in the private sector from November 1962 until March 1973. Van Houwelingen served on the Municipal Council of Leerdam from April 1968 until June 1974 and served on the Provincial-Council of Utrecht from June 1970 until June 1974. Van Houwelingen became a Member of the House of Representatives after the resignation of Barend Biesheuvel, taking office on 7 March 1973. After the election of 1977 the Christian Democratic Appeal and the People's Party for Freedom and Democracy (VVD) formed the Cabinet Van Agt-Wiegel, Van Houwelingen and several Christian Democratic Appeal Members of the House of Representatives were critical on the coalition agreement and formed an informal caucus in their own parliamentary group called the CDA-loyalists that followed the cabinet critically throughout the entire period. After the election of 1981 Van Houwelingen was appointed as State Secretary for Defence in the Cabinet Van Agt II, taking office on 14 September 1981. The Cabinet Van Agt II fell just seven months into its term on 12 May 1982 and continued to serve in a demissionary capacity until it was replaced by the caretaker Cabinet Van Agt III with Van Houwelingen continuing as State Secretary for Defence, taking office on 29 May 1982. After the election of 1982 Van Houwelingen returned as a Member of the House of Representatives, taking office on 16 September 1982. Following the cabinet formation of 1982 Van Houwelingen continued as State Secretary for Defence in the Cabinet Lubbers I, taking office on 4 November 1982. After the election of 1986 Van Houwelingen again returned as a Member of the House of Representatives, taking office on 3 June 1986. Following the cabinet formation of 1986 Van Houwelingen remained as State Secretary for Defence in the Cabinet Lubbers II, taking office on 14 July 1986. After the election of 1989 Van Houwelingen once again returned as a Member of the House of Representatives, taking office on 14 September 1989. Following the cabinet formation of 1989 Van Houwelingen was not giving a cabinet post in the new cabinet, the Cabinet Lubbers II was replaced by the Cabinet Lubbers III on 7 November 1989 and he continued to serve in the House of Representatives as a frontbencher chairing several Parliamentary committee of the Dutch parliament. In December 1993 Van Houwelingen announced that he wouldn't not stand for the election of 1994 and continued to serve until the end of the parliamentary term on 17 May 1994. In May 1994 Van Houwelingen was nominated as Mayor of Haarlemmermeer, serving from 1 June 1994 until 1 January 2003.

== Decorations ==
Honours
Ribbon bar	Honour	Country	Date	Comment
	Commander of the Order of the Netherlands Lion	Netherlands	20 November 1989	
	Grand Officer of the Order of Orange-Nassau	Netherlands	1 January 2003	

Political offices
Preceded by Cees van Lent	State Secretary for Defence; 1981–1989; Served alongside: Bram Stemerdink (1981–1982); Charl Schwietert (1982); Willem Hoekzema (1982–1986)	Succeeded by Berend-Jan van Voorst tot Voorst
Preceded by Wim van Eekelen	State Secretary for Defence; 1981–1989; Served alongside: Bram Stemerdink (1981–1982); Charl Schwietert (1982); Willem Hoekzema (1982–1986)	Succeeded by Berend-Jan van Voorst tot Voorst
Preceded by Arie Lems; Ad interim	Mayor of Haarlemmermeer; 1979	Succeeded by Fons Hertog
