= Cees van Lent =

Dutch politician (1922–2000)

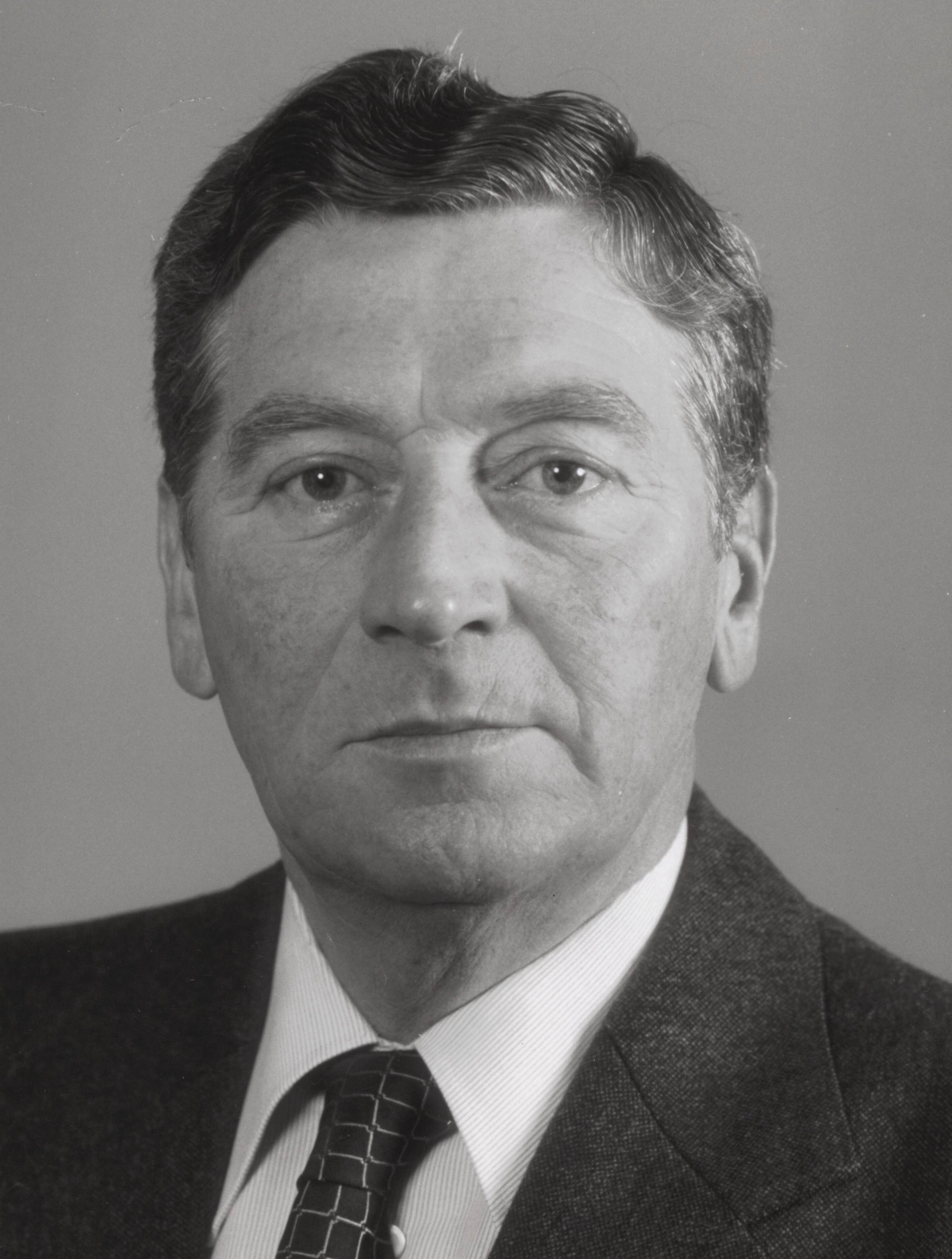
- Van Lent in 1977

State Secretary for Defence
- In office 11 March 1974 – 19 December 1977 Serving with Bram Stemerdink
- Prime Minister: Joop den Uyl
- Preceded by: Joep Mommersteeg
- Succeeded by: Himself
- In office 19 December 1977 – 11 September 1981 Serving with Wim van Eekelen
- Prime Minister: Dries van Agt
- Preceded by: Himself
- Succeeded by: Bram Stemerdink; Jan van Houwelingen

Personal details
- Born: Cornelis Leonardus Josephus van Lent; 27 July 1922 Heemstede, Netherlands
- Died: 8 March 2000 (aged 72) Leidschendam, Netherlands
- Party: Christian Democratic Appeal (from 1980)
- Other political affiliations: Catholic People's Party (until 1980)
- Occupation: Brigadier general; Politician

Cornelis Leonardus Josephus "Cees" van Lent (27 July 1922 – 8 March 2000) was a Dutch brigadier general and politician of the defunct Catholic People's Party (KVP) party, later the Christian Democratic Appeal (CDA) party.

== Life ==
Van Lent (right) with State Secretary Bram Stemerdink (left) and Defense Minister Henk Vredeling during a debate in the House of Representatives (January 20, 1976)

Cornelis “Cees” Leonardus Josephus van Lent, who came from a Roman Catholic family, completed officer training and served in numerous capacities as an officer, staff officer, and general staff officer in the Royal Netherlands Army (Koninklijke Landmacht). Between 1970 and 1971, he served as chairman of the Christian Officers' Association (Christen Officieren Vereniging). Having served as head of the personnel department and chief of personnel for the Royal Netherlands Army with the rank of colonel (Kolonel) until May 1, 1973, he then served as deputy chief of staff for personnel of the Royal Netherlands Army from May 1, 1973, to March 11, 1974. In this capacity, he was promoted to brigadier general (Brigade-generaal) on November 1, 1973.

Political offices
| Preceded by Joep Mommersteeg | State Secretary for Defence; 1974–1977 | Succeeded by Himself |
| Preceded by Himself | State Secretary for Defence; 1977–1981 | Succeeded by Bram Stemerdink; Jan van Houwelingen |
