= Netherlands Atlantic Association =

Dutch commission

Since its establishment in 1952, the Netherlands Atlantic Association is a forum for public debate on transatlantic security issues. It provides information and encourages research on topics such as the relationship between Europe and United States, developments in NATO and European security issues. The Netherlands Atlantic Association wants to promote the public debate on these issues.

== Board ==
The Netherlands Atlantic Association has an Executive and a General Board, which the Executive is part of the General Board. The executive committee shall meet at least four times a year and the General Board shall hold a meeting at least three times a year. In the Daily and General Board, all major political parties in the Netherlands and most scientific disciplines are represented. These boards ensure the independence of the Netherlands Atlantic Association.

== Partnerships ==
The Netherlands Atlantic Association is working with government agencies, political institutions, research institutes and non-governmental organizations at home and abroad, and on an ad hoc basis with the business world. This cooperation will contribute to the organization of national and international conferences. Finally, the Netherlands Atlantic Association initiates the development of activities of others in the field of international and national security issues and advises them in the design and implementation of projects in the above field.

== Atlantisch Perspectief ==
Atlantisch Perspectief (Atlantic Perspective) is the magazine of the Netherlands Atlantic Association. In Atlantisch Perspectief, which is issued eight times a year, focuses on developments in the field of international relations and security policy. In addition to articles, Atlantisch Perspectief also contains a section, Atlantisch Nieuws (Atlantic News), that provides an overview of the field of transatlantic relations, European security and Dutch foreign and defence policy.

The Netherlands Atlantic Association also provides other publications. Besides Atlantic Perspective there are conference reports, study reports, books and educational publications.

== Atlantic Youth ==
Like the other members of the Atlantic Treaty Association, the Netherlands Atlantic Association has its own youth wing. Initially founded by Wim van Eekelen and Rio Praaning, the JASON Foundation was the official youth wing of the Netherlands Atlantic Association between 1975 and 2006, making it one of the oldest members of the Youth Atlantic Treaty Association (YATA) - which only formally organized itself in 1994.

In 2006 the JASON Foundation and the Netherlands Atlantic Association split up as two separate organizations. In its stead, the Netherlands Atlantic Association founded the Netherlands Atlantic Youth (Jonge Atlantici). Like its predecessor, the Atlantic Youth focuses specifically on pupils, students and "young professionals". The Atlantic Youth aims to create and engage in joint security issues of the United States and Europe and create awareness among students and young people. It is a platform for dialogue on the future of NATO, both for young people in the Netherlands and in other NATO and PfP countries. To achieve this the Atlantic Youth organizes various national and international events aimed at a younger generation, which is also working with a large number of partner organizations. The Atlantic Youth, therefore, is open to proposals for new activities to the extent consistent with the objectives of the organization.
