= List of ministers of defence of the Netherlands =

Government minister of the Netherlands

Minister of Defence of the Netherlands
- Minister van Defensie

- Flag of the minister of defence

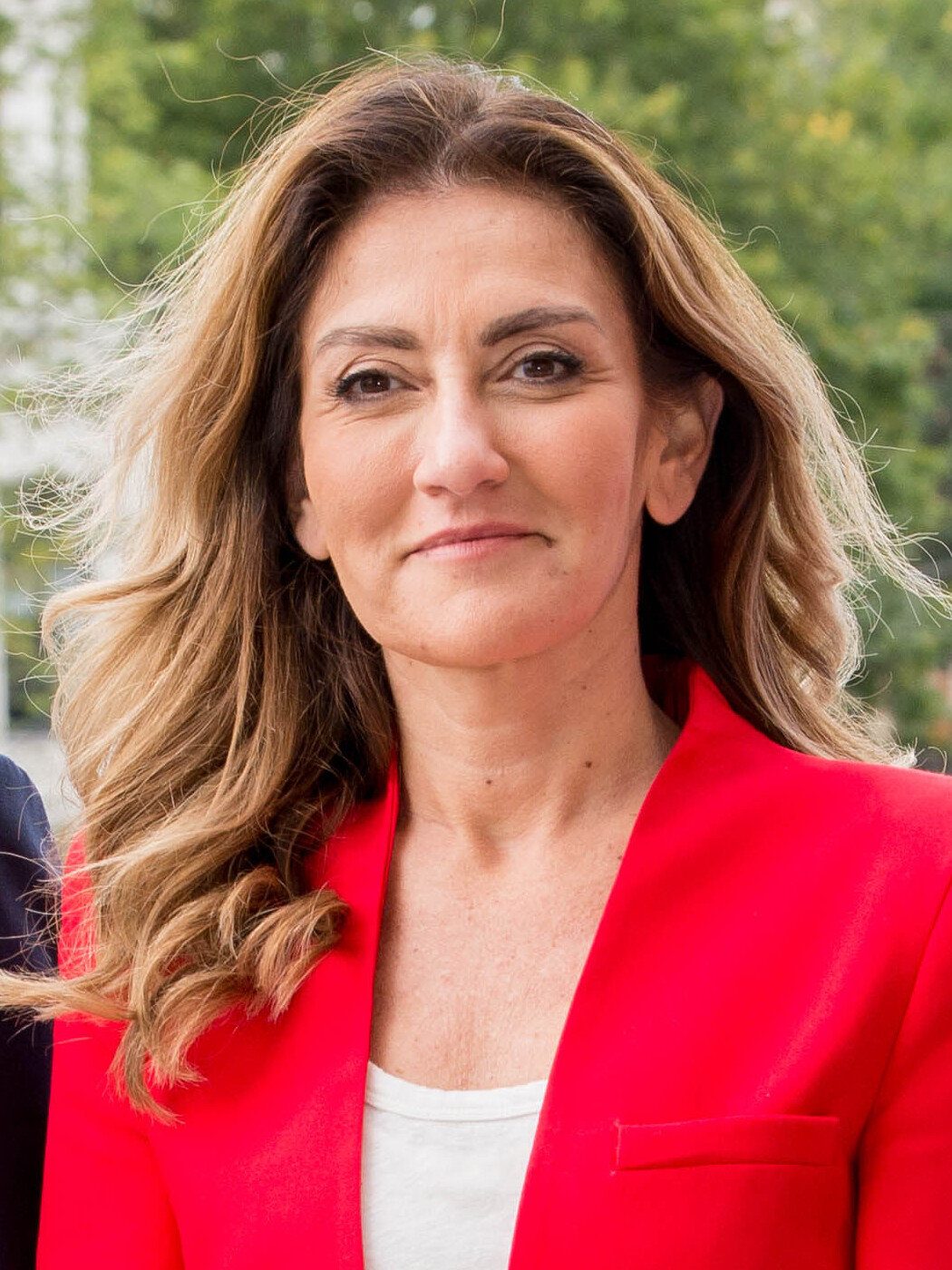
- Incumbent; Dilan Yeşilgöz since 23 February 2026
- Ministry of Defence
- Style: His/Her Excellency
- Member of: Council of Ministers
- Appointer: The monarch on advice of the prime minister
- Precursor: Minister of War; Minister of the Navy
- Formation: 1 September 1928 (historic); 7 August 1948 (current)
- First holder: Johan Lambooij (historic); Kees Staf (current)
- Final holder: Hendrik van Boeijen (historic)
- Abolished: 27 July 1941 (historic)
- Deputy: Derk Boswijk as State Secretary for Defence
- Salary: €205,991 (As of 2025)

The minister of defence (Dutch: Minister van Defensie) is the head of the Ministry of Defence and a member of the Cabinet and the Council of Ministers. The incumbent minister is Dilan Yeşilgöz of the People's Party for Freedom and Democracy (VVD) party who has been in office since 23 February 2026. Regularly, a state secretary is assigned to the ministry who is tasked with specific portfolios. The current state secretary is Derk Boswijk of the Christian Democratic Appeal (CDA) who also has been in office since 23 February 2026.

== List of ministers ==
=== Ministers of Defence (1928–1941) ===
Portrait	Name	Term of office	Party	Cabinet
	Major; Johan Lambooij (1874–1942)	1 September 1928 – 10 August 1929	Roman Catholic; State Party	De Geer I
Laurent Deckers	Dr. Laurent Deckers (1883–1978)	10 August 1929 – 2 September 1935^{[Appt]}	Roman Catholic; State Party	De Beerenbrouck III
Laurent Deckers	Dr. Laurent Deckers (1883–1978)	10 August 1929 – 2 September 1935^{[Appt]}	Roman Catholic; State Party	Colijn II
Laurent Deckers	Dr. Laurent Deckers (1883–1978)	10 August 1929 – 2 September 1935^{[Appt]}	Roman Catholic; State Party	Colijn III
Hendrikus Colijn	Major; Dr. Hendrikus Colijn (1869–1944)	2 September 1935 – 24 June 1937	Anti-Revolutionary Party	Colijn III
Jannes van Dijk	Captain; Dr. Jannes van Dijk (1871–1954)	24 June 1937 – 10 August 1939	Anti-Revolutionary Party	Colijn IV • V
Adriaan Dijxhoorn	Major general Adriaan Dijxhoorn (1889–1953)	10 August 1939 – 12 June 1941	Independent	De Geer II
Adriaan Dijxhoorn	Major general Adriaan Dijxhoorn (1889–1953)	10 August 1939 – 12 June 1941	Independent	Gerbrandy I
Hendrik van Boeijen	Hendrik van Boeijen (1889–1947)	12 June 1941 – 27 July 1941; Ad interim	Christian Historical Union	Gerbrandy I

=== Ministers of War and the Navy (1948–1956) ===
Portrait	Name	Term of office	Party	Cabinet
Wim Schokking	Captain; Wim Schokking (1900–1960)	7 August 1948 – 16 October 1950^{[Res]}	Christian; Historical Union	Drees– Van Schaik
Hans s'Jacob	Hans s'Jacob (1906–1967)	16 October 1950 – 15 March 1951	Independent	Drees– Van Schaik
Kees Staf	Kees Staf (1905–1973)	15 March 1951 – 13 October 1956	Christian; Historical Union	Drees I • II

=== Ministers of Defence (since 1956) ===
Portrait	Name	Term of office	Party	Cabinet
Kees Staf	Kees Staf (1905–1973)	13 October 1956 – 19 May 1959^{[Minister]}	Christian; Historical Union	Drees III
Kees Staf	Kees Staf (1905–1973)	13 October 1956 – 19 May 1959^{[Minister]}	Christian; Historical Union	Beel II
Sidney J. van den Bergh	Major general Sidney J. van den Bergh (1898–1977)	19 May 1959 – 1 August 1959^{[Res]}	People's Party for Freedom and Democracy	De Quay
Jan de Quay	Major; Jan de Quay (1901–1985)	1 August 1959 – 4 September 1959; Acting	Catholic; People's Party	De Quay
Sim Visser	Sim Visser (1908–1983)	4 September 1959 – 24 July 1963	People's Party for Freedom and Democracy	De Quay
Piet de Jong	Captain; Piet de Jong (1915–2016)	24 July 1963 – 5 April 1967	Catholic; People's Party	Marijnen
Piet de Jong	Captain; Piet de Jong (1915–2016)	24 July 1963 – 5 April 1967	Catholic; People's Party	Cals
Piet de Jong	Captain; Piet de Jong (1915–2016)	24 July 1963 – 5 April 1967	Catholic; People's Party	Zijlstra
Willem den Toom	Lieutenant general Willem den Toom (1911–1998)	5 April 1967 – 6 July 1971	People's Party for Freedom and Democracy	De Jong
Hans de Koster	Hans de Koster (1914–1992)	6 July 1971 – 11 May 1973	People's Party for Freedom and Democracy	Biesheuvel I • II
Henk Vredeling	Henk Vredeling (1924–2007)	11 May 1973 – 31 december 1976^{[App]}	Labour Party	Den Uyl
Bram Stemerdink	Captain; Bram Stemerdink (born 1936)	31 december 1976 – 19 December 1977	Labour Party	Den Uyl
Roelof Kruisinga	Roelof Kruisinga (1922–2012)	19 December 1977 – 4 March 1978^{[Res]}	Christian; Historical Union	Van Agt I
Jan de Koning	Jan de Koning (1926–1994)	4 March 1978 – 8 March 1978; Ad Interim ^{[Minister]}	Anti-Revolutionary; Party	Van Agt I
Willem Scholten	Willem Scholten (1927–2005)	8 March 1978 – 25 August 1980^{[App]}	Christian; Historical Union	Van Agt I
Pieter de Geus	Captain; Pieter de Geus (1929–2004)	25 August 1980 – 11 September 1981	Christian; Historical Union	Van Agt I
Pieter de Geus	Captain; Pieter de Geus (1929–2004)	25 August 1980 – 11 September 1981	Christian; Democratic Appeal	Van Agt I
Hans van Mierlo	Hans van Mierlo (1931–2010)	11 September 1981 – 4 November 1982	Democrats 66	Van Agt II • III
Job de Ruiter	Job de Ruiter (1930–2015)	4 November 1982 – 14 July 1986	Christian; Democratic Appeal	Lubbers I
Wim van Eekelen	Wim van Eekelen (1931–2025)	14 July 1986 – 6 September 1988^{[Res]}	People's Party for Freedom and Democracy	Lubbers II
Piet Bukman	Piet Bukman (1934–2022)	6 September 1988 – 24 September 1988; Ad Interim ^{[Minister]}	Christian; Democratic Appeal	Lubbers II
Frits Bolkestein	Frits Bolkestein (1933–2025)	24 September 1988 – 7 November 1989	People's Party for Freedom and Democracy	Lubbers II
Relus ter Beek	Relus ter Beek (1944–2008)	7 November 1989 – 6 February 1991^{[Note]}	Labour Party	Lubbers III
Jan Pronk	Jan Pronk (born 1940)	6 February 1991 – 3 March 1991; Acting ^{[Minister]}	Labour Party	Lubbers III
Relus ter Beek	Relus ter Beek (1944–2008)	3 March 1991 – 22 August 1994	Labour Party	Lubbers III
Joris Voorhoeve	Joris Voorhoeve (born 1945)	22 August 1994 – 3 August 1998^{[Minister]}	People's Party for Freedom and Democracy	Kok I
Frank de Grave	Frank de Grave (born 1955)	3 August 1998 – 22 July 2002	People's Party for Freedom and Democracy	Kok II
Benk Korthals	Benk Korthals (born 1944)	22 July 2002 – 12 December 2002^{[Res]}	People's Party for Freedom and Democracy	Balkenende I
Henk Kamp	Henk Kamp (born 1952)	12 December 2002 – 22 February 2007^{[Minister]}	People's Party for Freedom and Democracy	Balkenende I
Henk Kamp	Henk Kamp (born 1952)	12 December 2002 – 22 February 2007^{[Minister]}	People's Party for Freedom and Democracy	Balkenende II • III
Eimert van Middelkoop	Eimert van Middelkoop (born 1949)	22 February 2007 – 14 October 2010^{[Minister]}	Christian Union	Balkenende IV
Hans Hillen	Hans Hillen (born 1947)	14 October 2010 – 5 November 2012	Christian; Democratic Appeal	Rutte I
Jeanine Hennis-Plasschaert	Commander; Jeanine Hennis- Plasschaert (born 1973)	5 November 2012 – 4 October 2017^{[Res]}	People's Party for Freedom and Democracy	Rutte II
Klaas Dijkhoff	Klaas Dijkhoff (born 1981)	4 October 2017 – 26 October 2017	People's Party for Freedom and Democracy	Rutte II
Ank Bijleveld	Ank Bijleveld (born 1962)	26 October 2017 – 17 September 2021^{[Res]}	Christian; Democratic Appeal	Rutte III
Ferdinand Grapperhaus	Ferdinand; Grapperhaus (born 1959)	17 September 2021 – 24 September 2021; Acting ^{[Minister]}	Christian; Democratic Appeal	Rutte III
Henk Kamp	Henk Kamp (born 1952)	24 September 2021 – 10 January 2022	People's Party for Freedom and Democracy	Rutte III
Kajsa Ollongren	Jonkvrouw; Kajsa Ollongren (born 1967)	10 January 2022 – 2 July 2024	Democrats 66	Rutte IV
Ruben Brekelmans	Ruben Brekelmans (born 1986)	2 July 2024 – 23 February 2026	People's Party for Freedom and Democracy	Schoof
Dilan Yeşilgöz	Dilan Yeşilgöz (born 1977)	23 February 2026 – Incumbent	People's Party for Freedom and Democracy	Jetten

^{Resigned}
^{Medical leave of absence from 6 February 1991 until 3 March 1991}
^{Appointed as Minister of Agriculture and Fisheries}
^{Appointed as European Commissioner}
^{Appointed as Vice-President of the Council of State}
^{Minister of Agriculture, Fisheries and Food Supplies from 22 December 1958}
^{Minister for Development Cooperation}
^{Minister for Kingdom Relations}
^{Minister of Housing, Spatial Planning and the Environment until 27 May 2003}
^{Minister without Portfolio for Housing from 23 February 2010}
^{Minister of Justice and Security}

== List of state secretaries for defence ==
Portrait	Name	Portfolio(s)	Term of office	Party	Cabinet
Harry Moorman	Vice admiral Harry Moorman (1899–1971)	• Navy	1 May 1949 – 27 November 1950	Catholic; People's Party	Drees–Van Schaik • Drees I
Harry Moorman	Vice admiral Harry Moorman (1899–1971)	• Army • Navy • Air Force	27 November 1950 – 1 June 1951	Catholic; People's Party	Drees–Van Schaik • Drees I
Harry Moorman	Vice admiral Harry Moorman (1899–1971)	• Navy	1 June 1951 – 19 May 1959	Catholic; People's Party	Drees II • III
Harry Moorman	Vice admiral Harry Moorman (1899–1971)	• Navy	1 June 1951 – 19 May 1959	Catholic; People's Party	Beel II
Wim Fockema Andreae	Wim Fockema; Andreae (1909–1996)	• Army • Air Force	1 May 1949 – 27 November 1950^{[Res]}	People's Party for Freedom and Democracy	Drees–Van Schaik
Ferdinand Kranenburg	Ferdinand; Kranenburg (1911–1994)	• Army • Air Force	1 June 1951 – 1 June 1958^{[Res]}	Labour Party	Drees I • II
Ferdinand Kranenburg	Ferdinand; Kranenburg (1911–1994)	• Army • Air Force	1 June 1951 – 1 June 1958^{[Res]}	Labour Party	Drees III
Meine van Veen	Meine van Veen (1893–1970)	• Army • Air Force	25 October 1958 – 22 December 1958	Labour Party	Drees III
Michael Calmeyer	Lieutenant general Michael Calmeyer (1895–1990)	• Army • Air Force	19 June 1959 – 24 July 1963	Christian; Historical Union	De Quay
Piet de Jong	Captain; Piet de Jong (1915–2016)	• Navy	25 June 1959 – 24 July 1963	Catholic; People's Party	De Quay
Adri van Es	Vice admiral Adri van Es (1913–1994)	• Navy	14 August 1963 – 6 July 1971	Anti-Revolutionary; Party	Marijnen
Adri van Es	Vice admiral Adri van Es (1913–1994)	• Navy	14 August 1963 – 6 July 1971	Anti-Revolutionary; Party	Cals
Adri van Es	Vice admiral Adri van Es (1913–1994)	• Navy	14 August 1963 – 6 July 1971	Anti-Revolutionary; Party	Zijlstra
Adri van Es	Vice admiral Adri van Es (1913–1994)	• Navy	14 August 1963 – 6 July 1971	Anti-Revolutionary; Party	De Jong
Adri van Es	Vice admiral Adri van Es (1913–1994)	• Human; Resources • Equipment	6 July 1971 – 16 September 1972^{[Res]}	Anti-Revolutionary; Party	Biesheuvel I • II
Joop Haex	Brigadier general Joop Haex (1911–2002)	• Army	14 August 1963 – 14 April 1965	Christian; Historical Union	Marijnen
Wim van Eekelen	Major general Willem den Toom (1911–1998)	• Air Force	25 November 1963 – 14 April 1965	People's Party for Freedom and Democracy	Marijnen
Gerard Peijnenburg	Gerard; Peijnenburg (1919–2000)	• Army	13 May 1965 – 5 April 1967	Independent	Cals
Gerard Peijnenburg	Gerard; Peijnenburg (1919–2000)	• Army	13 May 1965 – 5 April 1967	Independent	Zijlstra
Jan Borghouts	Colonel; Jan Borghouts (1910–1966)	• Air Force	12 July 1965 – 5 February 1966^{[Died]}	Catholic; People's Party	Cals
Heije Schaper	Lieutenant general Heije Schaper (1906–1996)	• Air Force	22 June 1966 – 5 April 1967	Independent	Cals
Heije Schaper	Lieutenant general Heije Schaper (1906–1996)	• Air Force	22 June 1966 – 5 April 1967	Independent	Zijlstra
Joop Haex	Major general Joop Haex (1911–2002)	• Army	18 April 1967 – 6 July 1971	Christian; Historical Union	De Jong
Bob Duynstee	Bob Duynstee (1920–2014)	• Air Force	28 April 1967 – 6 July 1971	Catholic; People's Party	De Jong
Joep Mommersteeg	Joep; Mommersteeg (1917–1991)	• Human; Resources	11 May 1973 – 1 March 1974^{[Res]}	Catholic; People's Party	Den Uyl
Cees van Lent	Brigadier general Cees van Lent (1922–2000)	• Human; Resources	11 March 1974 – 11 September 1981	Catholic; People's Party	Den Uyl
Cees van Lent	Brigadier general Cees van Lent (1922–2000)	• Human; Resources	11 March 1974 – 11 September 1981	Christian; Democratic Appeal	Van Agt I
Bram Stemerdink	Captain; Bram Stemerdink (born 1936)	• Equipment • Justice	11 May 1973 – 1 January 1977^{[App]}	Labour Party	Den Uyl
Wim van Eekelen	Wim van Eekelen (1931–2025)	• Equipment • Justice	20 January 1978 – 11 September 1981	People's Party for Freedom and Democracy	Van Agt I
Bram Stemerdink	Captain; Bram Stemerdink (born 1936)	• Equipment • Justice	11 September 1981 – 29 May 1982^{[Res]}	Labour Party	Van Agt II
Jan van Houwelingen	Jan van Houwelingen (1937–2013)	• Human; Resources	14 September 1981 – 7 November 1989	Christian; Democratic Appeal	Van Agt II
Jan van Houwelingen	Jan van Houwelingen (1937–2013)	• Human; Resources • Equipment	14 September 1981 – 7 November 1989	Christian; Democratic Appeal	Van Agt III
Jan van Houwelingen	Jan van Houwelingen (1937–2013)	• Equipment	14 September 1981 – 7 November 1989	Christian; Democratic Appeal	Lubbers I
Jan van Houwelingen	Jan van Houwelingen (1937–2013)	• Human; Resources • Equipment	14 September 1981 – 7 November 1989	Christian; Democratic Appeal	Lubbers II
Charl Schwietert	Charl Schwietert (born 1943)	• Human; Resources	8 November 1982 – 11 November 1982^{[Res]}	People's Party for Freedom and Democracy	Lubbers I
Willem Hoekzema	Willem Hoekzema (born 1939)	• Human; Resources	19 November 1982 – 14 July 1986	People's Party for Freedom and Democracy	Lubbers I
Berend-Jan van Voorst tot Voorst	Baron; Berend-Jan van Voorst tot Voorst (1944–2023)	• Human; Resources • Equipment • Justice	7 November 1989 – 1 June 1993^{[App]}	Christian; Democratic Appeal	Lubbers III
Ton Frinking	Lieutenant colonel Ton Frinking (1931–2022)	• Human; Resources • Equipment • Justice	1 June 1993 – 22 August 1994	Christian; Democratic Appeal	Lubbers III
Jan Gmelich Meijling	Lieutenant commander Jan Gmelich; Meijling (1936–2012)	• Human; Resources • Equipment	22 August 1994 – 3 August 1998	People's Party for Freedom and Democracy	Kok I
Henk van Hoof	Commander; Henk van Hoof (born 1947)	• Human; Resources • Equipment	3 August 1998 – 22 July 2002	People's Party for Freedom and Democracy	Kok II
Cees van der Knaap	Cees van der Knaap (born 1951)	• Human; Resources • Military; Administration • Equipment	22 July 2002 – 18 December 2007^{[App]}	Christian; Democratic Appeal	Balkenende; I • II • III
Cees van der Knaap	Cees van der Knaap (born 1951)	• Human; Resources • Military; Administration • Equipment	22 July 2002 – 18 December 2007^{[App]}	Christian; Democratic Appeal	Balkenende IV
Jack de Vries	Lieutenant; Jack de Vries (born 1968)	• Human; Resources • Military; Administration • Equipment	18 December 2007 – 18 May 2010^{[Res]}	Christian; Democratic Appeal	Balkenende IV
Vacant
Barbara Visser	Barbara Visser (born 1977)	• Human; Resources • Military; Administration • Equipment	26 October 2017 – 31 August 2021^{[App]}	People's Party for Freedom and Democracy	Rutte III
Christophe van der Maat	Christophe van der Maat (born 1980)	• Human; Resources • Military; Administration • Equipment	10 January 2022 – 2 July 2024	People's Party for Freedom and Democracy	Rutte IV
Gijs Tuinman	Lieutenant Colonel; Gijs Tuinman (born 1979)	• Human; Resources • Military; Administration • Equipment	2 July 2024 – 23 February 2026	Farmer–Citizen; Movement	Schoof
	Derk Boswijk (born 1989)	• Human; Resources • Military; Administration • Equipment	23 February 2026 – Incumbent	Christian; Democratic Appeal	Jetten

^{Resigned}
^{Died in office}
^{Appointed as Minister of Defence}
^{Appointed as Queen's Commissioner of Limburg}
^{Appointed as Mayor of Ede}
^{Appointed as Minister of Infrastructure and Water Management}

== See also ==
- Ministry of Defence
- Chief of Defence
