= Henk Vredeling =

Dutch politician (1924–2007)

His Excellency Henk Vredeling
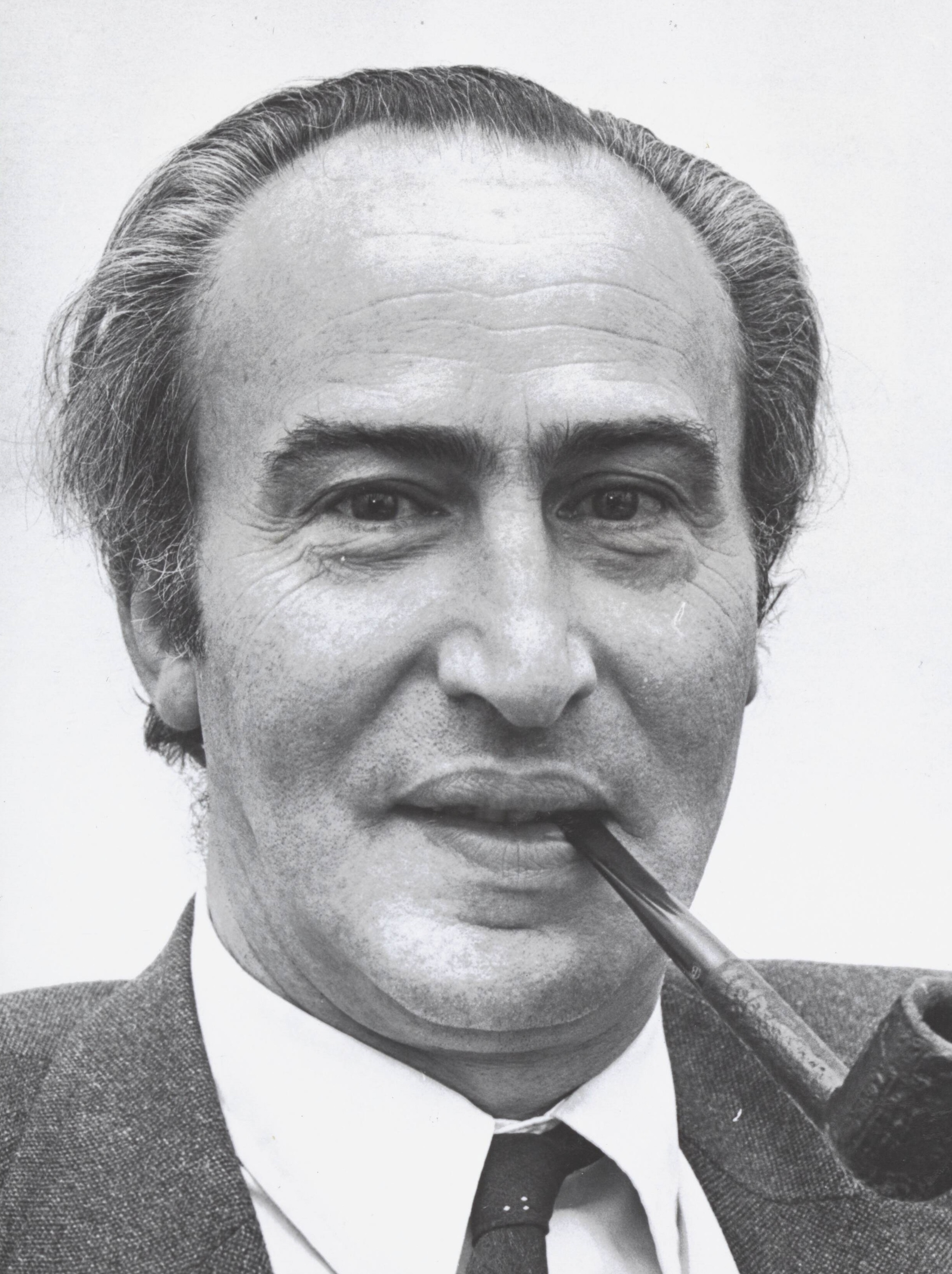
- Vredeling in 1973

European Commissioner for Employment and Social Affairs
- In office 6 January 1977 – 6 January 1981
- President: Roy Jenkins
- Preceded by: Patrick Hillery
- Succeeded by: Ivor Richard

Minister of Defence
- In office 11 May 1973 – 31 December 1976
- Prime Minister: Joop den Uyl
- Preceded by: Hans de Koster
- Succeeded by: Bram Stemerdink

Member of the European Parliament
- In office 19 March 1958 – 11 May 1973
- Parliamentary group: Socialist Group
- Constituency: Netherlands

Member of the House of Representatives
- In office 6 November 1956 – 11 May 1973
- Parliamentary group: Labour Party

Personal details
- Born: Hendrikus Vredeling; 20 November 1924 Amersfoort, Netherlands
- Died: 27 October 2007 (aged 82) Huis ter Heide, Netherlands
- Party: Labour Party (from 1947)
- Spouse: Jola Schouten (m. 1948)
- Education: Wageningen University (Bachelor of Science in Agriculture, Master of Science in Engineering)
- Occupation: Politician · Agronomist · Trade Union Leader · Nonprofit director

Hendrikus "Henk" Vredeling (20 November 1924 – 27 October 2007) was a Dutch politician of the Labour Party (PvdA). He served as Minister of Defence in the Den Uyl cabinet from 1973 to 1977, and as European Commissioner from 1977 to 1981.

== Early life ==
Vredeling was born on 20 November 1924 in Amersfoort to Pieter Vredeling en Alijda Antonetta Blom. His family was religiously orthodox Reformed, but he gradually abandoned his faith during his teenage years. During World War II, he joined the Dutch resistance and was eventually imprisoned in Buchenwald, being freed just before he was slated to be executed. This experience would have a radical impact on his political stances during his career, including on Israel and European integration. In 1947, Vredeling joined the Labour Party (PvdA).

He studied at the National Agricultural College in Wageningen, and served as an advisor to various agricultural groups from 1950 to 1956.

== Political career ==
Following its expansion from 100 to 150 seats, Vredeling was elected to the House of Representatives in the 1956 Dutch general election. In 1958, he was appointed to serve in the first European Parliamentary Assembly, renamed the European Parliament in 1962, a body which he would be a member of until 1973.

=== Minister of Defence (1973-1977) ===
In 1973, Vredeling was appointed as minister of Defence in the Den Uyl cabinet, the first social democrat to ever hold the post, despite his initial reluctance and a self-professed "dislike of uniforms". His appointment was controversial, causing tensions both within the Dutch Armed Forces and with New Left elements within the PvdA. The late 1960s had seen the formation of a union for military conscripts, the Union of Conscripted Soldiers ("Vakbond van Dienstplichtige Militairen" (VVDM)), which sought more equal relations within the military and an end to harsh disciplinary measures. Vredeling sought both to ensure freedom of expression within the military to lower tensions while also ensuring loyalty for his military modernisation plans.

A crisis erupted in 1973 when the Yom Kippur War erupted in the Middle East. Despite having agreed in a meeting on 10 October with Prime Minister Den Uyl and Foreign Minister Max van der Stoel to refrain from providing arms to Israel, Vredeling secretly agreed to provide arms to Israel without the knowledge of the cabinet after having spoke to the Israeli ambassador. Despite the Den Uyl cabinets desire for a "more balanced Middle Eastern policy", Vredeling was personally sympathetic to the Israeli cause, appealing to his past in World War II and a desire to prevent a second "expelling of the Jews", and had attended a pro-Israeli rally incognito following the start of the war.

In 1974, Vredeling officially published a notice allowing homosexuals to serve in the Dutch Armed Forces. Until then, they had been regarded as having an "abnormal sexuality", which classed them as mentally ill and therefore unfit for service. On the other hand, in 1977 he amended laws on conscientious objection, expanding possibilities for granting exemptions due to being a family breadwinner. This led to the proliferation of so-called "Vredeling marriages", which were formed primarily to escape the draft.

When Vredeling decided to purchase 102 F-16 planes in 1975, this caused significant tensions within the PvdA parliamentary group. A PvdA congress in April similarly rejected the purchase. However, after agreeing to lower the amount of purchased planes from 102 to 84, his plan was passed. His resistance to pressure from figures within the PPR and Minister of Finance Wim Duisenberg to cut the defence budget further earned him wide admiration even from the political right.

In 1976, following the Lockheed affair in which prince Bernhard had been implicated, Vredeling became one of the main figures arguing for criminally prosecuting the prince, only being dissuaded by the government after being convinced that prosecution would threaten the Dutch monarchy. He did however persuade the prince, who he would later describe as "a typical Hun ("mof")", to stop appearing publicly in military uniform.

=== European Commissioner (1977-1981) ===
On 6 January 1977, Henk Vredeling was appointed as European Commissioner for Employment and Social Affairs. During his term, he sought to expand the EEC's responsibilities on matters of social policy to combat the unemployment crisis in many European countries. However, he would face resistance from the member states, many of which had centre-right leaders who disagreed with the social democratic Vredeling's approach to economic issues. Many of his initially ambitious plans would end up either watered-down or failed to pass entirely.

One of Vredeling's main successes occurred early in his tenure, when he presented a plan in Juky to allocate 300 million guilders from the European Social Fund to combat youth unemployment and give 150,000 young people jobs. In 1978 the plan gained the support of the European ministers of social affairs in the Council of the European Community over initial French resistance, and from 1979 funds would be allocated to the member states to create new jobs. While numerically small, it marked one of the first steps the European Community took in a policy area that had almost entirely been the competency of the member states before.

Other initiatives were less successful. Attempts at encouraging a reduction in working hours through European policy in order to combat unemployment largely failed over objections from employer organisations and fellow Commissioners, although a plan for European support for the iron and steel industry did include it as one of its provisions alongside early retirement and . A planned directive to mandate codetermination for firms with branches in the EEC and more than 1000 employees (the Vredeling directive) was first watered down and then shelved, only eventually being adopted in the 1990s.

In 1981, Vredeling announced he would not seek a second term, which had become unrealistic regardless following the formation of the centre-right First Van Agt cabinet. In the end, he had mostly failed to make social policy a central role for the EEC, for which he would blame the perceived cowardice of the member states in failing to support his plans.

=== Personality ===
Vredeling was known for his habit of speaking his mind unconventionally, and speaking candidly about various individuals. In a 1985 interview with the opinion magazine HP De Tijd he had called Prince Bernhard a "typical Hun" due to his "obsession with uniforms", described himself as "a frustrated rabbit", and harshly criticised NATO Secretary General Joseph Luns and fellow PvdA politician Jan Pronk. Most famously, in a Strasbourg hotel in 1979, out of anger at his (absent) fellow European Commissioner Roy Jenkins, with whom he had had a run-in earlier that day, he hurled an empty whiskey bottle through a mirrored window. Earlier that evening, he had also insulted MEP Jim Janssen van Raaij, whom he had just met. In later accounts of the incident, the two incidents were combined into “an ashtray thrown at Janssen van Raaij’s head”, a misconception which was only corrected following Vredeling's death in 2007. Vredeling himself would state he had actually thrown a bottle of soda water.

=== Later life ===
Henk Vredeling died on 27 October 2007 in Huis ter Heide.

== Decorations ==
Honours
Ribbon bar	Honour	Country	Date
	Knight of the Order of the Netherlands Lion	Netherlands	30 April 1968
	Commander of the Order of Orange-Nassau	Netherlands	20 January 1977

Political offices
Preceded by Hans de Koster	Minister of Defence; 1973–1977	Succeeded by Bram Stemerdink
Preceded by Pierre Lardinois	European Commissioner from the Netherlands; 1977–1981	Succeeded by Frans Andriessen
Preceded by Patrick Hillery	European Commissioner for Employment and Social Affairs; 1977–1981	Succeeded by Ivor Richard
