= First Lubbers cabinet =

Dutch government cabinet, 1982 to 1986

- Cabinet of the Netherlands

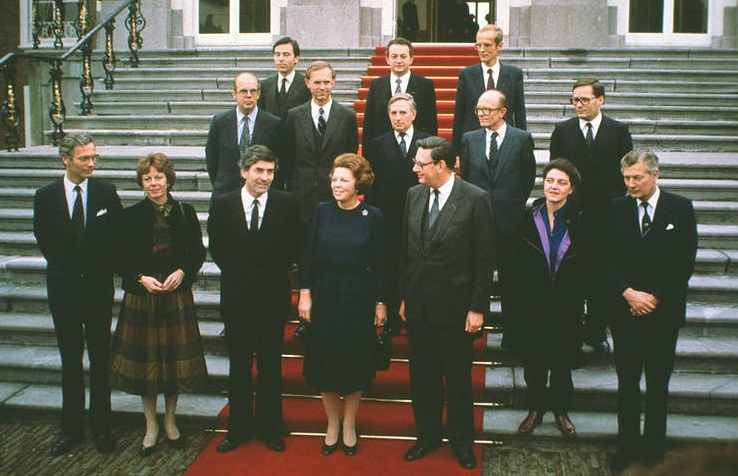
- The installation of the First Lubbers cabinet on 4 November 1982
- Date formed: 4 November 1982
- Date dissolved: 14 July 1986 (Demissionary from 22 May 1986)

People and organisations
- Head of state: Queen Beatrix
- Head of government: Ruud Lubbers
- Deputy head of government: Gijs van Aardenne
- No. of ministers: 14
- Ministers removed: 1
- Total no. of members: 15
- Member party: Christian Democratic Appeal (CDA); People's Party for Freedom and Democracy (VVD)
- Status in legislature: Right-wing majority government

History
- Incoming formation: 1982 formation
- Outgoing formation: 1986 formation
- Election: 1982 election
- Outgoing election: 1986 election
- Legislature terms: 1982–1986
- Predecessor: Third Van Agt cabinet
- Successor: Second Lubbers cabinet

The first Lubbers cabinet was the executive branch of the Dutch Government from 4 November 1982 until 14 July 1986. The cabinet was formed by the christian-democratic Christian Democratic Appeal (CDA) and the conservative-liberal People's Party for Freedom and Democracy (VVD) after the election of 1982. The cabinet was a right-wing coalition and had a substantial majority in the House of Representatives with Christian Democratic Leader Ruud Lubbers serving as Prime Minister. Prominent Liberal politician Gijs van Aardenne, a former Minister of Economic Affairs, served as Deputy Prime Minister and returned Minister of Economic Affairs.

The cabinet served during the Economic expansion of the 1980s, domestically it was able to implement several major social reforms to Social security and stimulating privatization and sustainable development and dealing with early 1980s recession, internationally it had to deal with several crises such as the decision to allow NATO to place the Medium Extended Air Defense System (MEADS) at Woensdrecht Air Base. The cabinet suffered several major internal conflicts including a critical parliamentary inquiry into Deputy Prime Minister Van Aardenne, but completed its entire term and was succeeded by a continuation of the coalition in the Second Lubbers cabinet following the election of 1986.

== Formation ==
Composition of the cabinet in relation to the rest of the legislature

Following the fall of the Second Van Agt cabinet on 12 May 1982 the Labour Party (PvdA) left the coalition, subsequently on 14 May 1982 Queen Beatrix appointed Senator Piet Steenkamp (CDA) as informateur to look at the possibilities of the Labour Party rejoining the coalition. After negotiations between the parties, Piet Steenkamp failed to reach an agreement between the parties. On 25 May 1982 Queen Beatrix appointed incumbent Prime Minister Dries van Agt (CDA) as formateur to form a rump cabinet with the Christian Democratic Appeal (CDA) and the Democrats 66 (D'66). On 29 May 1982 the Third Van Agt cabinet was installed and served as a caretaker government until the election of 1982.

After the election on 8 September 1982 the Labour Party of Joop den Uyl was the winner of the election winning 3 new seats and had now a total of 47 seats. The CDA of incumbent Prime Minister Van Agt lost 3 seats and now had 45 seats. The People's Party for Freedom and Democracy under the new leadership of Ed Nijpels was the biggest winner gaining 10 new seats and now had a total of 36 seats in the House of Representatives.

On 10 September 1982 Queen Beatrix appointed Member of the House of Representatives Jos van Kemenade (PvdA), the former Minister of Education and Sciences as informateur to start the cabinet formation process. The first round of talks between the Labour Party and the CDA were troubled by the personal animosity between incumbent Prime Minister and leader of the Christian Democratic Appeal Dries van Agt and former Prime Minister and Leader of the Labour Party Den Uyl. Van Agt had served as Deputy Prime Minister under Den Uyl his cabinet, and Den Uyl had served as Deputy Prime Minister under Van Agt in his Second cabinet. On 30 September 1982 after long negotiations between the parties, Jos van Kemenade failed to reach an agreement to form a new coalition.

On 1 October 1982 Queen Beatrix appointed Vice-President of the Council of State Willem Scholten (CDA), a former Minister of Defence as informateur to start a cabinet formation process between the CDA and the People's Party for Freedom and Democracy. Soon thereafter incumbent Prime Minister and leader of the CDA Van Agt unexpectedly announced his retirement from national politics and stood down as leader of the CDA on 25 October 1982 and subsequently endorsed the Parliamentary leader of the CDA in the House of Representatives Ruud Lubbers, a former Minister of Economic Affairs as his successor. On 30 October 1982 the CDA and the VVD agreed to form a coalition and Queen Beatrix subsequently appointed Ruud Lubbers as formateur and tasked him with forming a new cabinet. On 4 November 1982 the cabinet formation was completed and the First Lubbers cabinet was installed with Lubbers as Prime Minister.

== Term ==
=== Changes ===
On 12 November 1982 just 4 days after taking office State Secretary for Defence Charl Schwietert (VVD) resigned after he admitted to have falsified his curriculum vitae. On 12 November 1982 Mayor of Coevorden Willem Hoekzema (VVD) was appointed as his successor.

On 20 February 1986 Minister of the Interior Koos Rietkerk (VVD) unexpectedly died in his office from a heart Attack at the age of 58. Minister of Justice Frits Korthals Altes (VVD) served as acting Minister of the Interior until 12 March 1986 when Member of the House of Representatives Rudolf de Korte (VVD) was installed as the new Minister of the Interior.

On 22 June 1986 State Secretary for Economic Affairs Piet van Zeil (CDA) resigned after he was appointed as Mayor of Heerlen and because the cabinet was already demissionary he was not replaced.

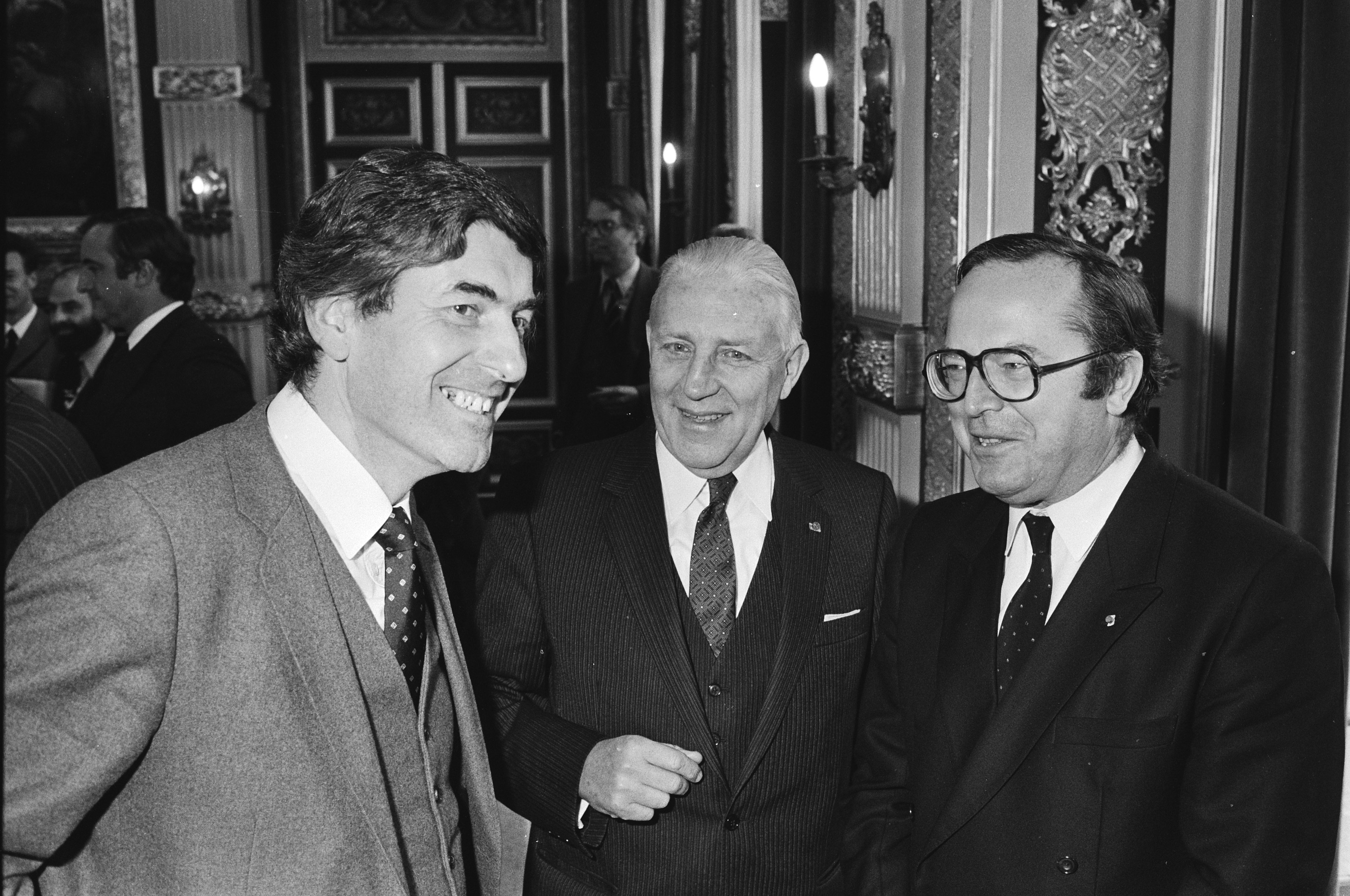
Prime Minister Ruud Lubbers, Prime Minister of Luxembourg Pierre Werner and Prime Minister of Belgium Wilfried Martens at the Ministry of General Affairs on 10 November 1982.

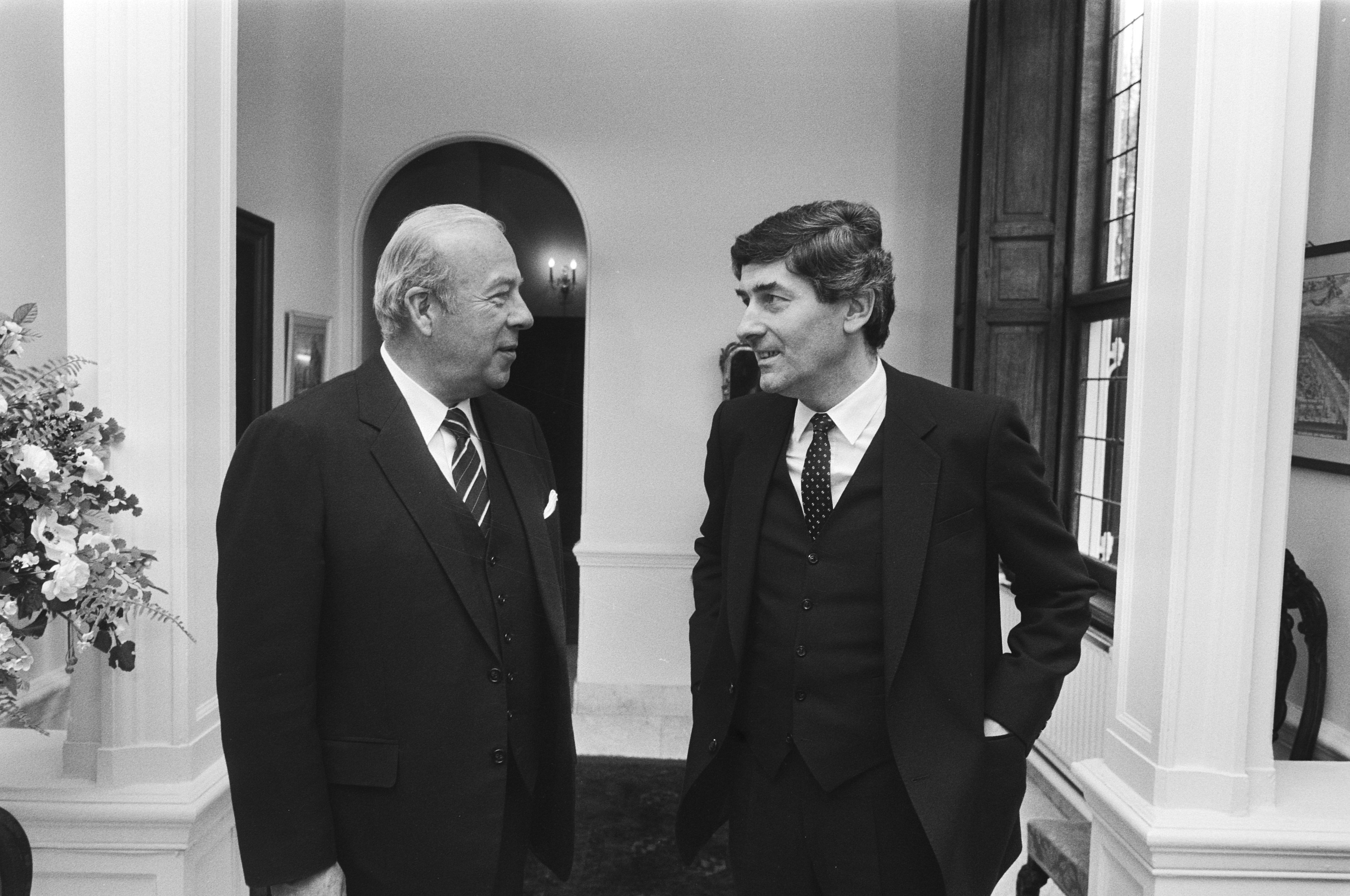
United States Secretary of State George Shultz and Prime Minister Ruud Lubbers at the Catshuis on 11 December 1982.

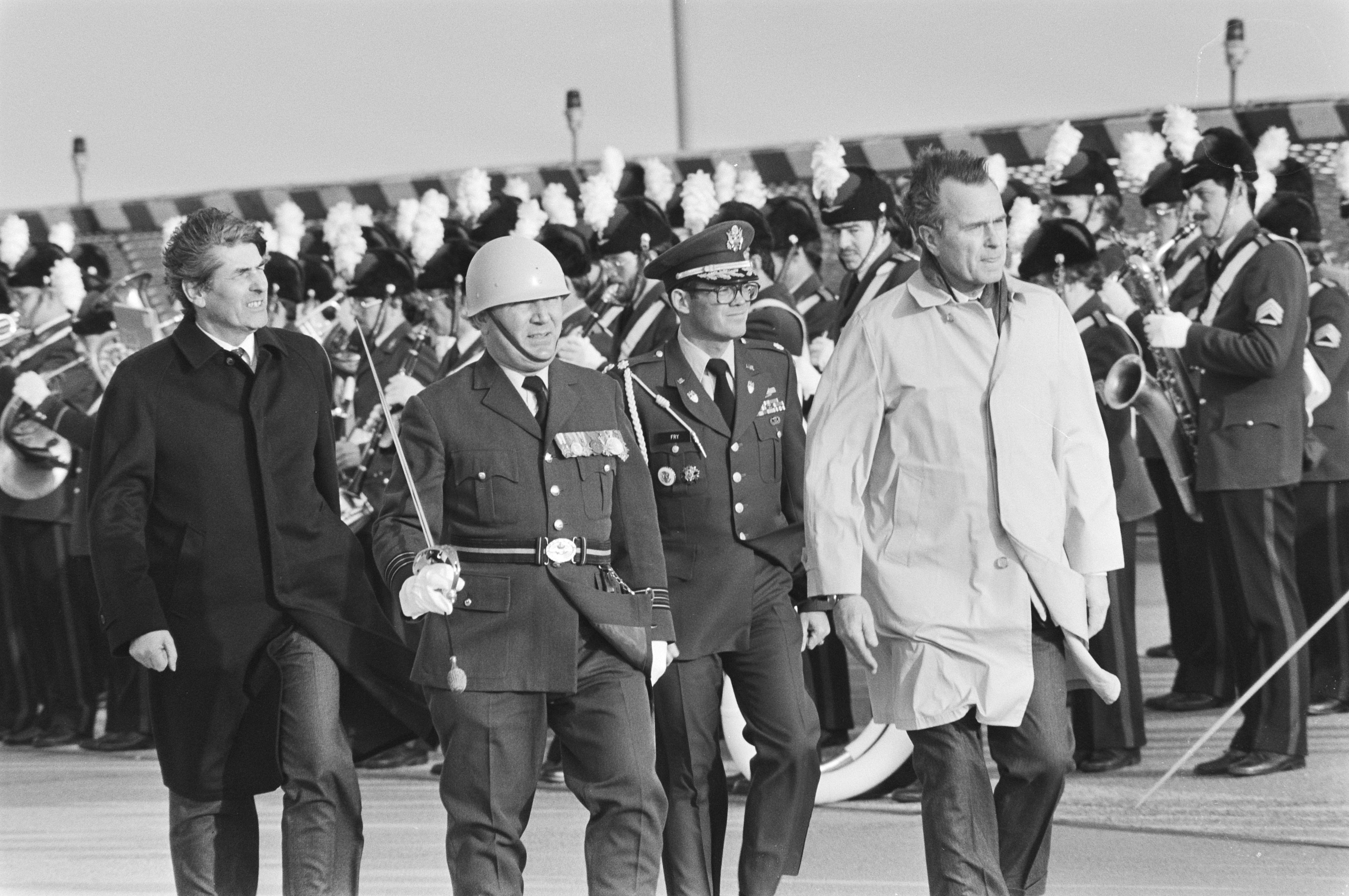
Prime Minister Ruud Lubbers and Vice President of the United States George H. W. Bush at Airport Schiphol on 1 February 1983.

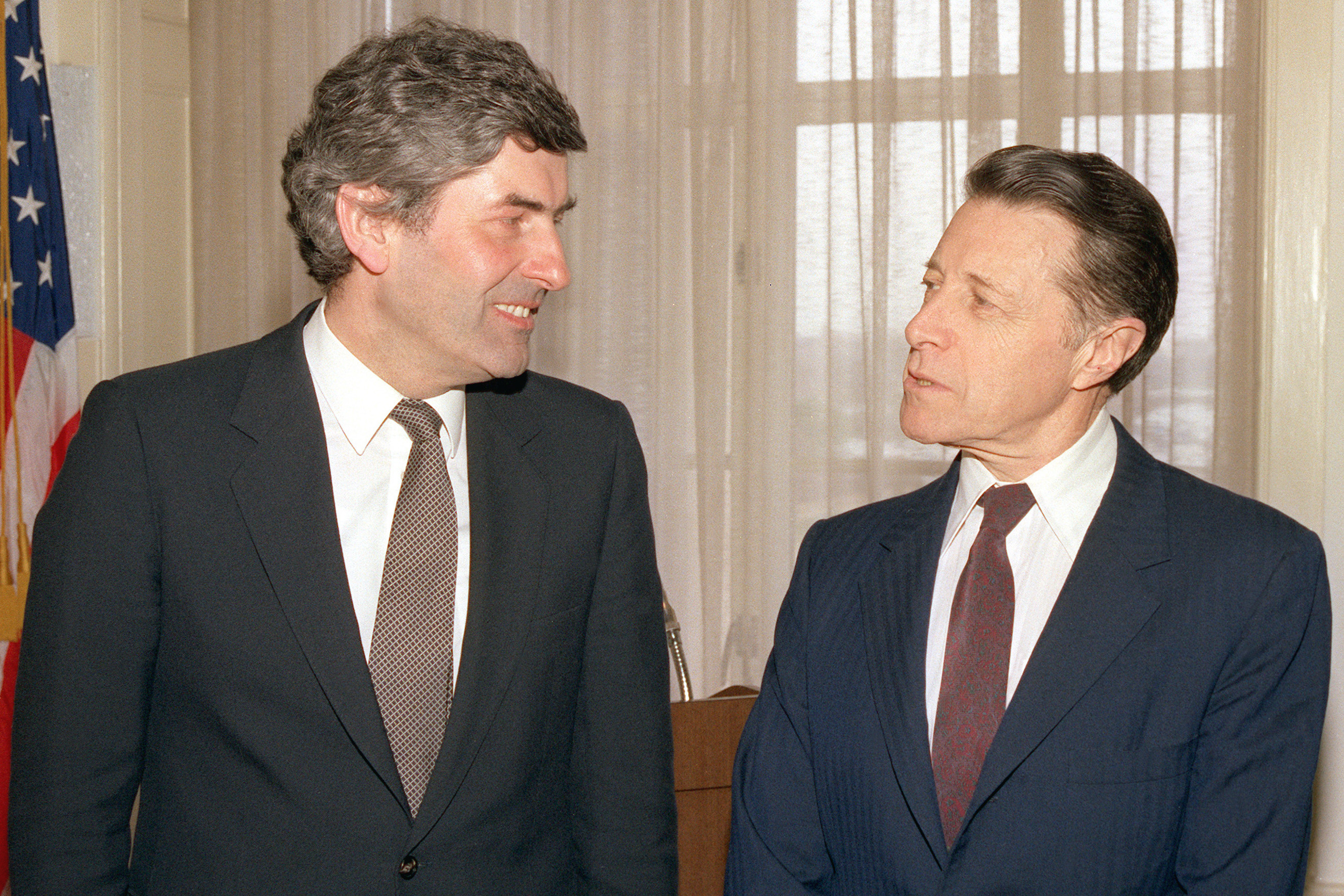
Prime Minister Ruud Lubbers and United States Secretary of Defense Caspar Weinberger at The Pentagon on 16 March 1983.

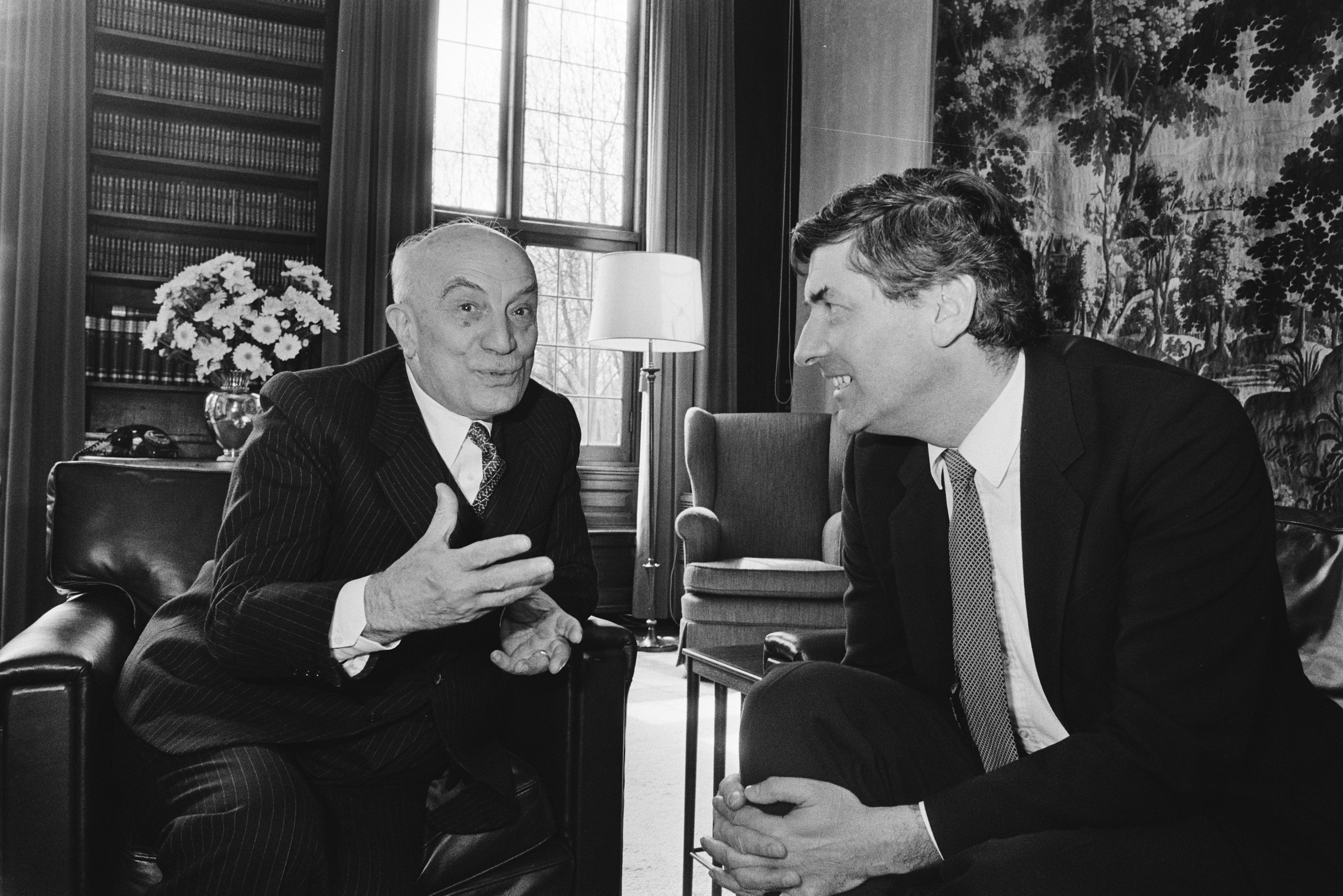
Prime Minister of Italy Amintore Fanfani and Prime Minister Ruud Lubbers at the Catshuis on 13 April 1983.

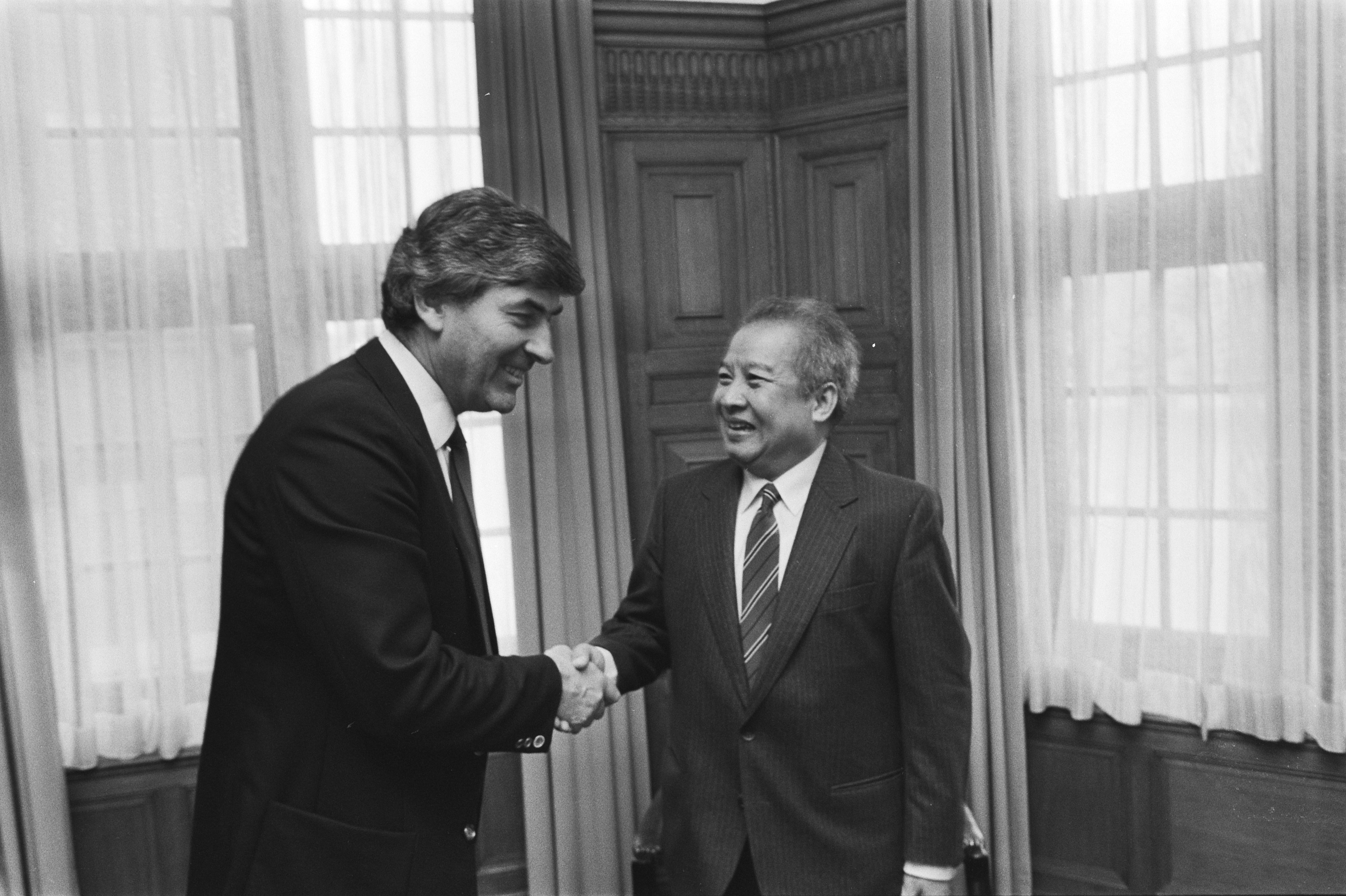
Prime Minister Ruud Lubbers and the former King of Cambodia Norodom Sihanouk at the Torentje on 15 September 1983.

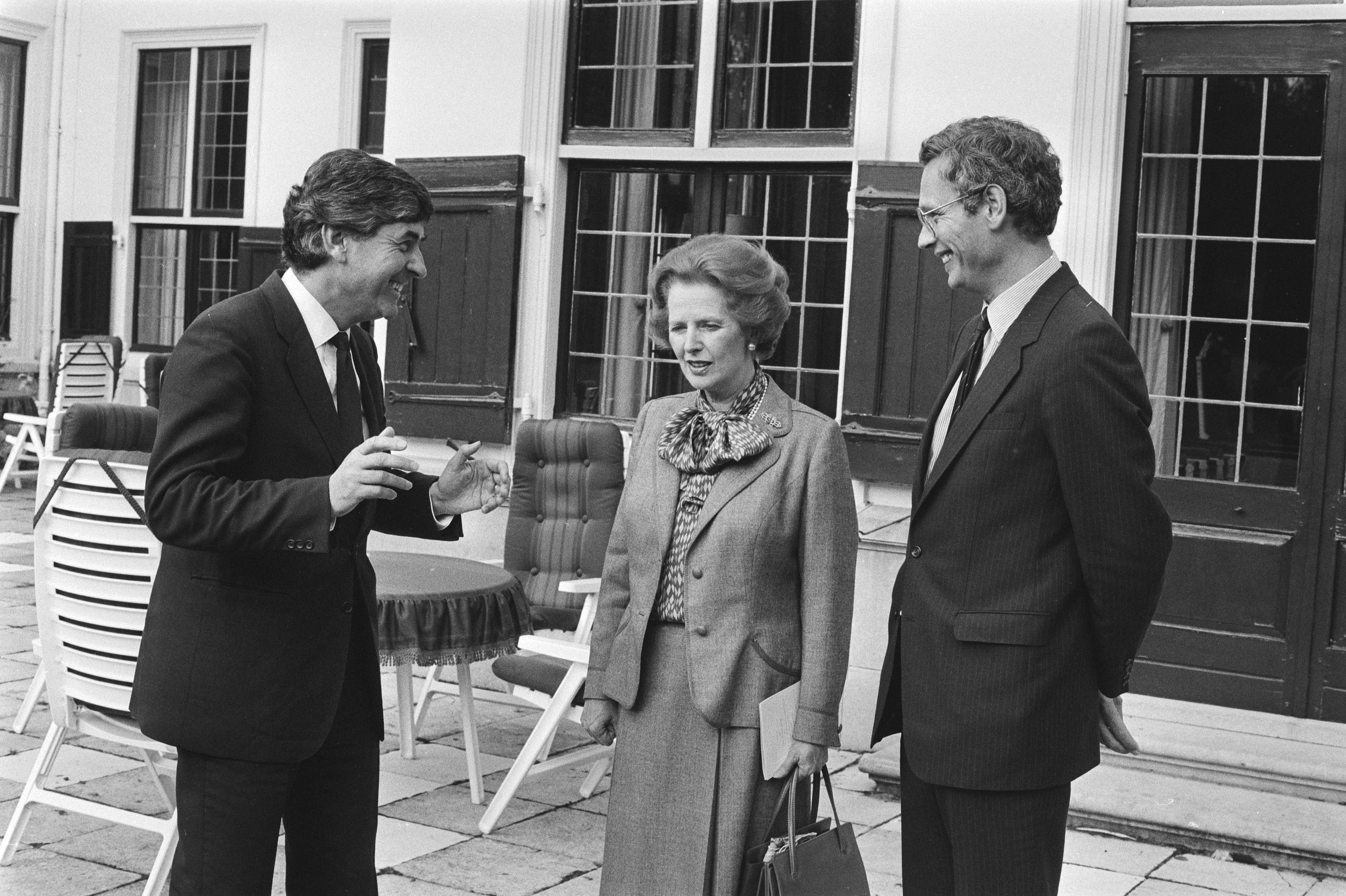
Prime Minister Ruud Lubbers, Prime Minister of the United Kingdom Margaret Thatcher and Minister Hans van den Broek at the Catshuis on 19 September 1983.

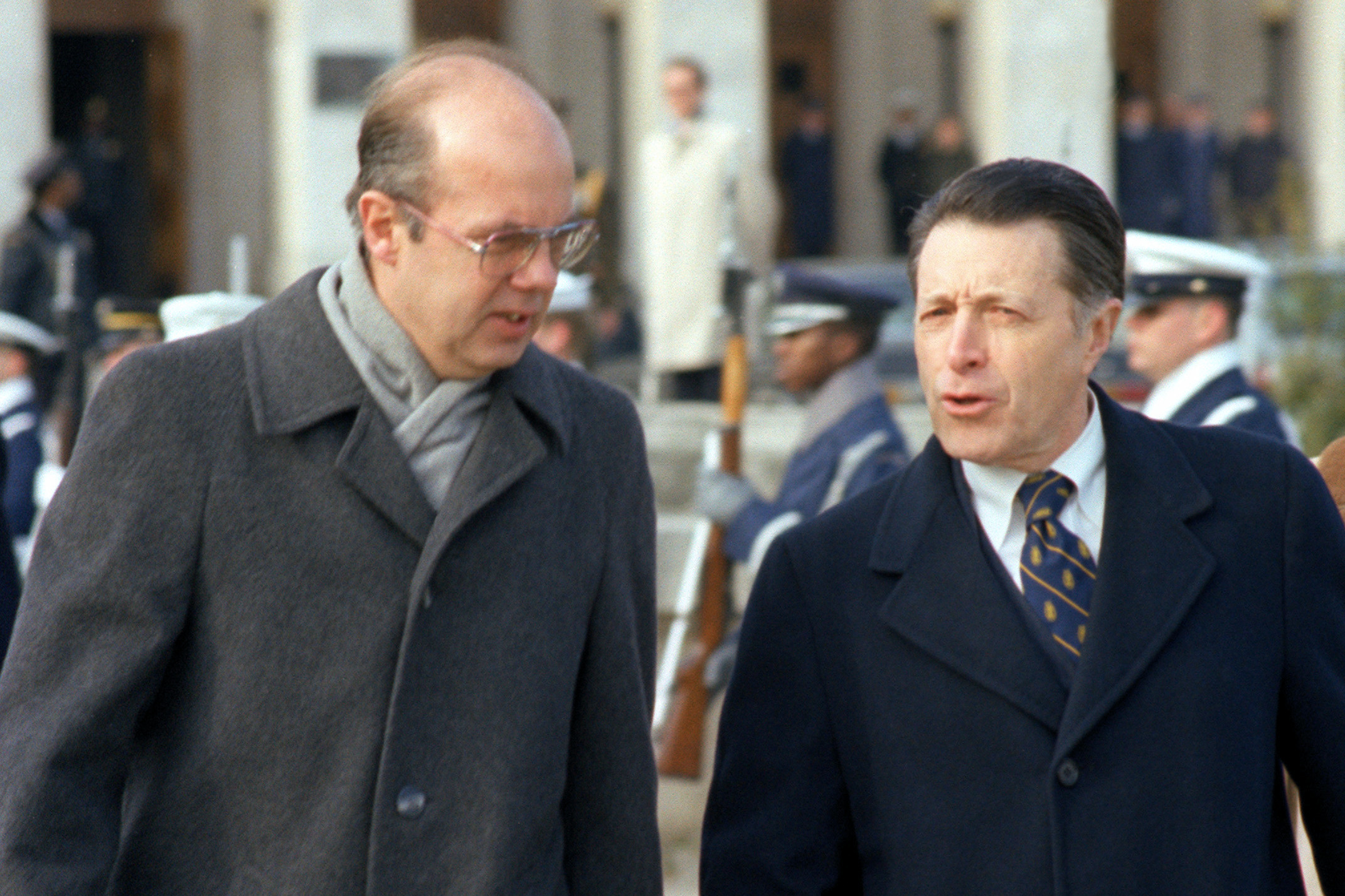
Minister of Defence Job de Ruiter and United States Secretary of Defense Caspar Weinberger at The Pentagon on 2 October 1983.

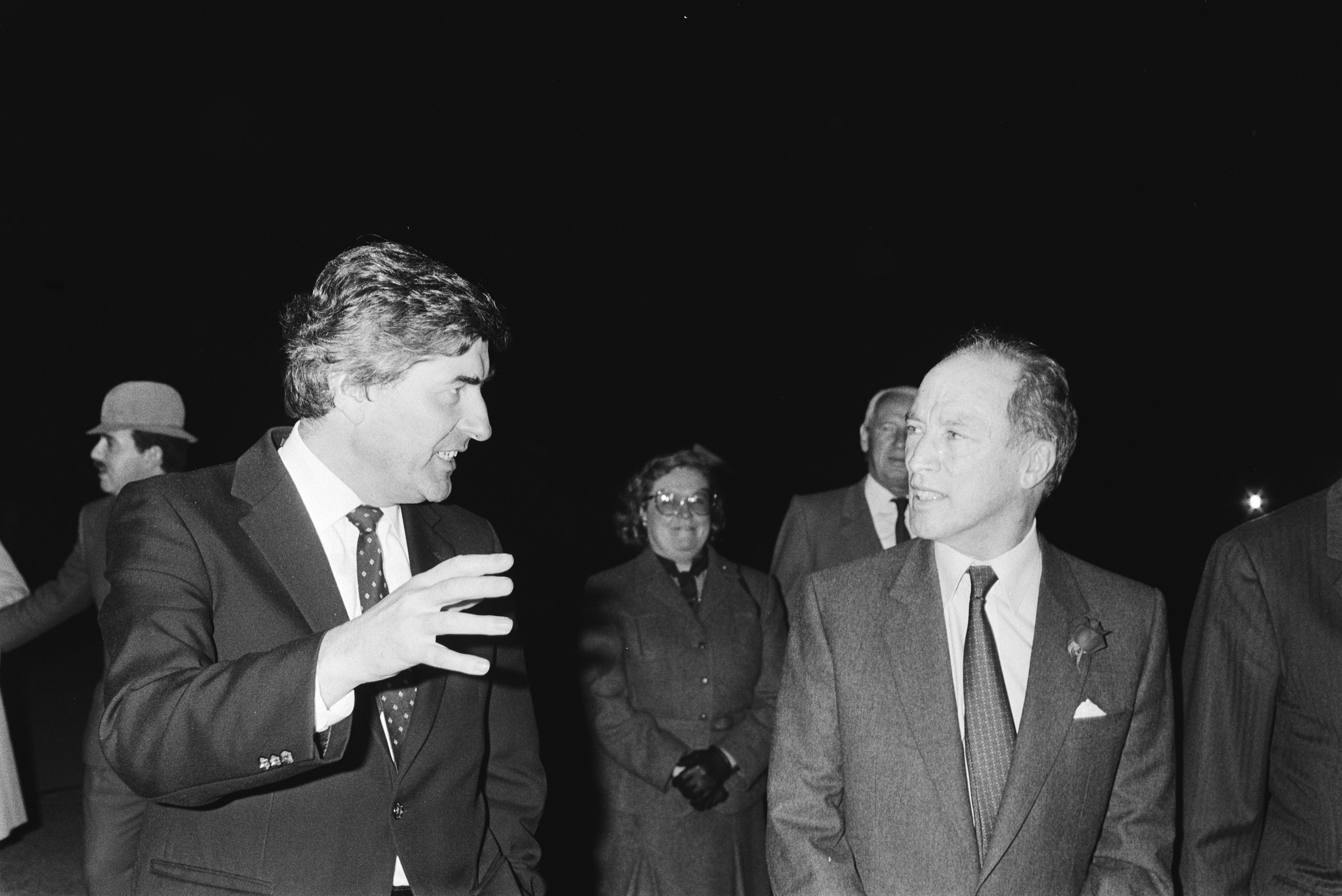
Prime Minister Ruud Lubbers and Prime Minister of Canada Pierre Trudeau at Valkenburg Naval Air Base on 8 November 1983.

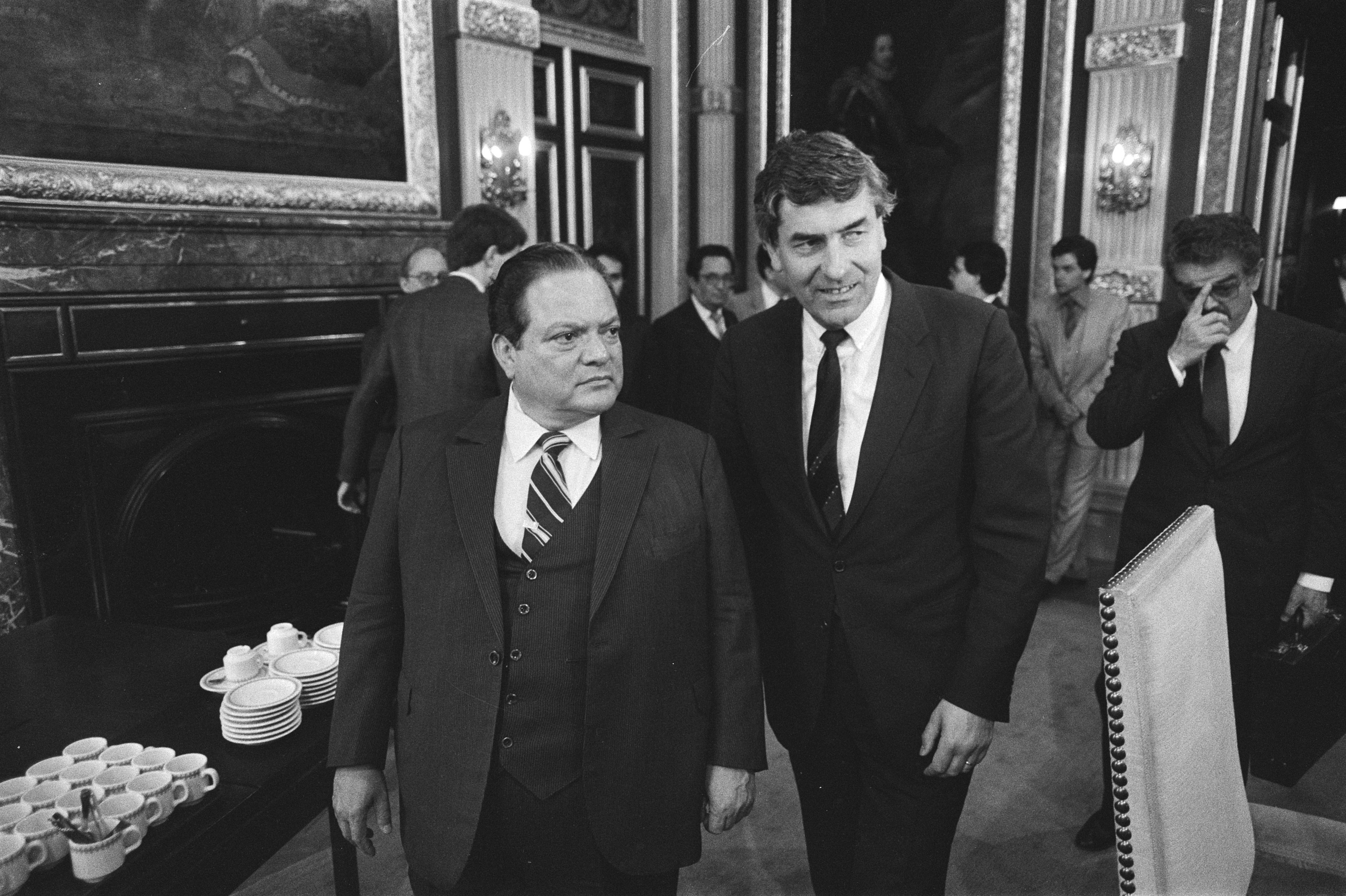
President of Costa Rica Luis Alberto Monge and Prime Minister Ruud Lubbers at the Ministry of General Affairs on 7 June 1984.

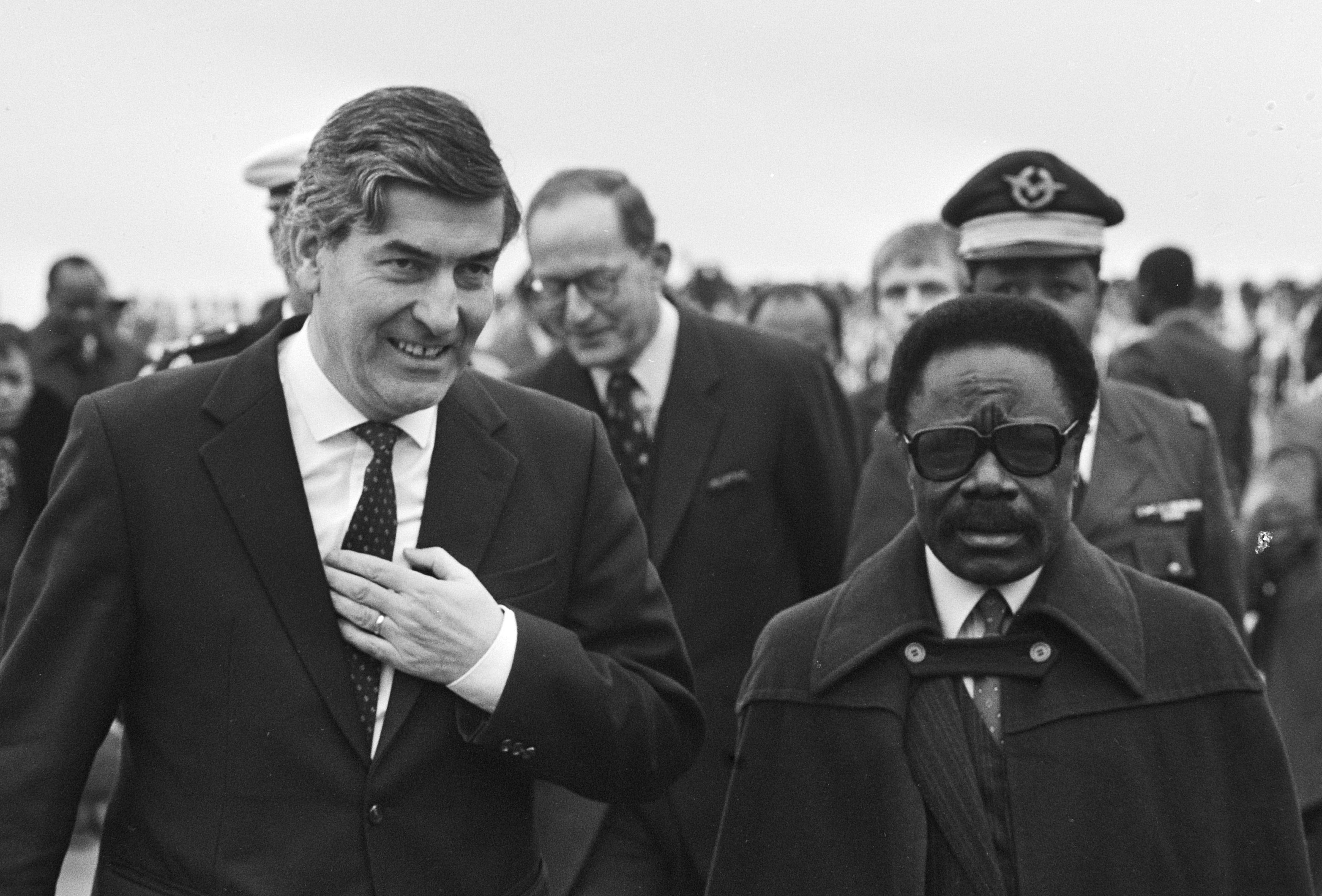
Prime Minister Ruud Lubbers and President of Gabon Omar Bongo at Zestienhoven Airport on 7 November 1984.

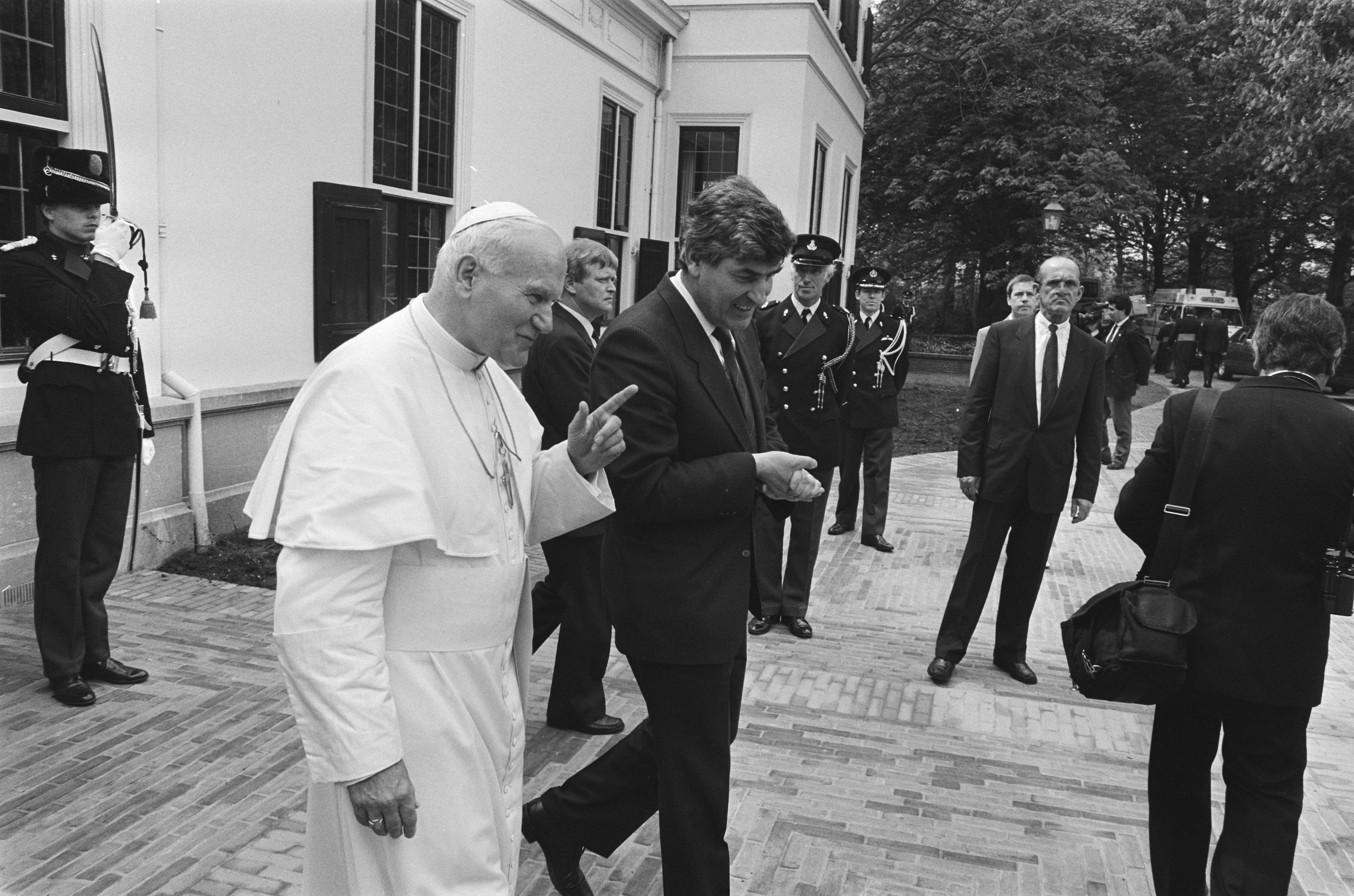
Pope John Paul II and Prime Minister Ruud Lubbers at the Catshuis on 13 May 1985.

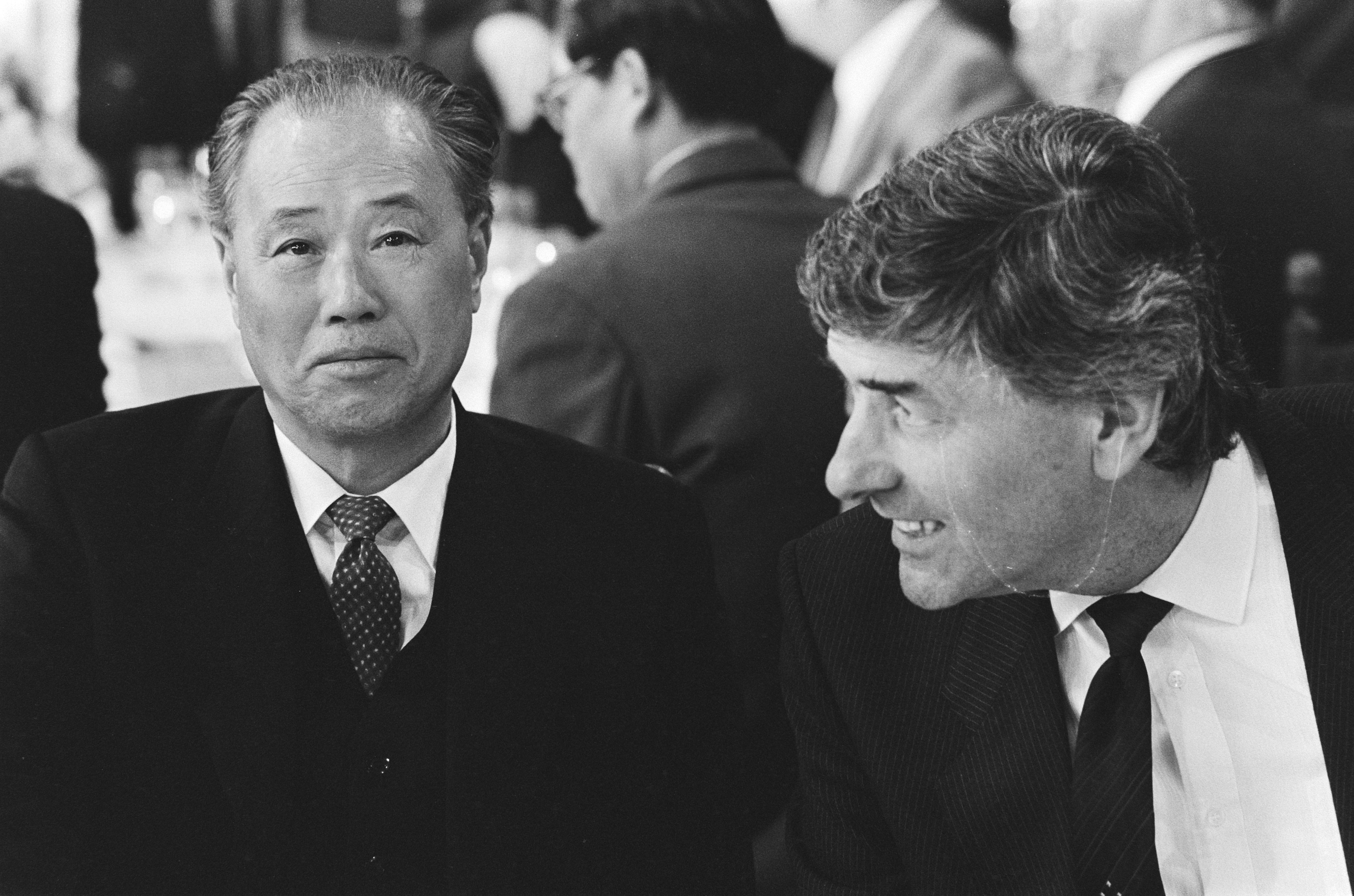
Premier of the People's Republic of China Zhao Ziyang and Prime Minister Ruud Lubbers in The Hague on 17 June 1985.

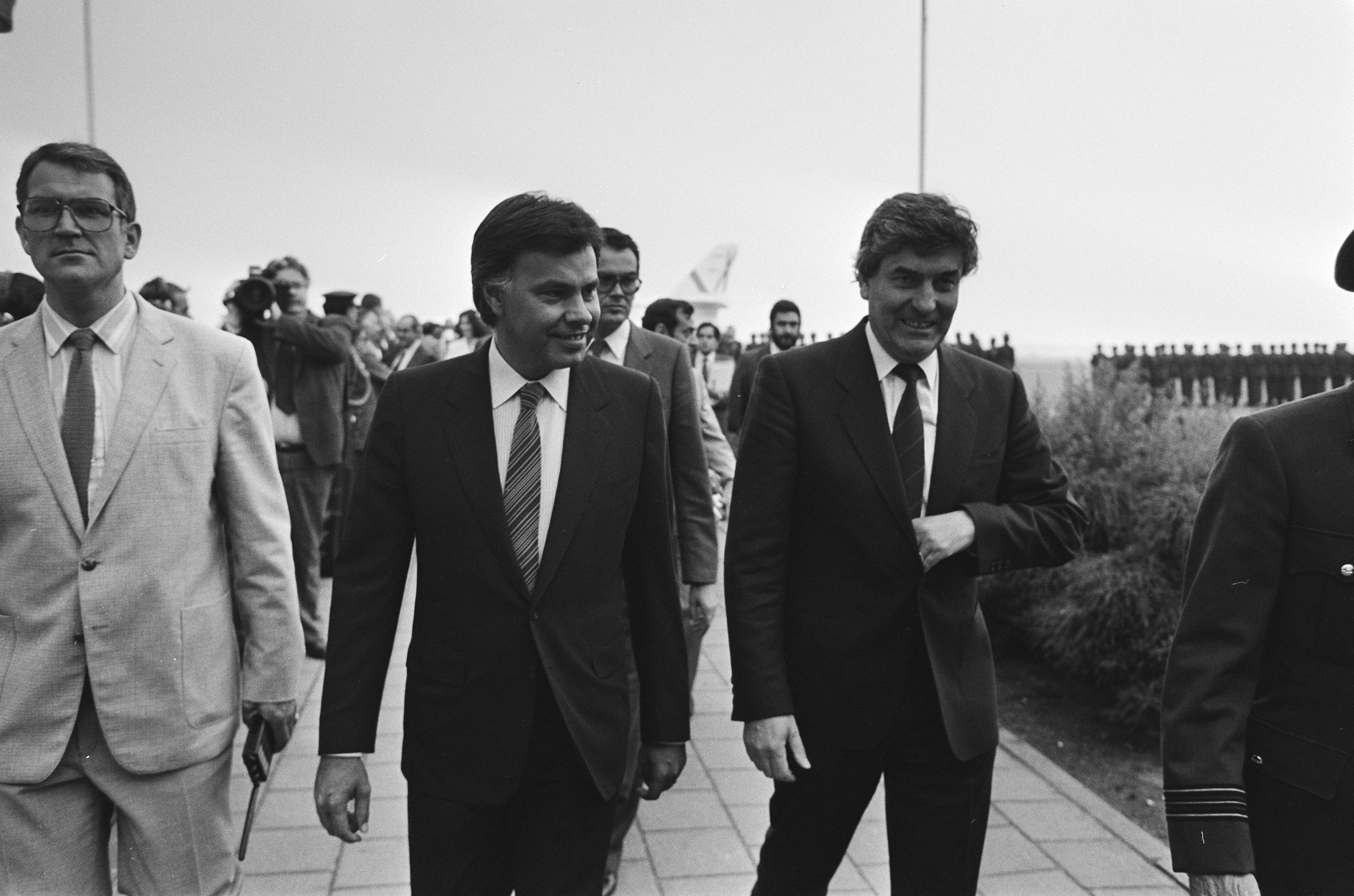
Prime Minister of Spain Felipe González and Prime Minister Ruud Lubbers at Ypenburg Airport on 19 June 1985.

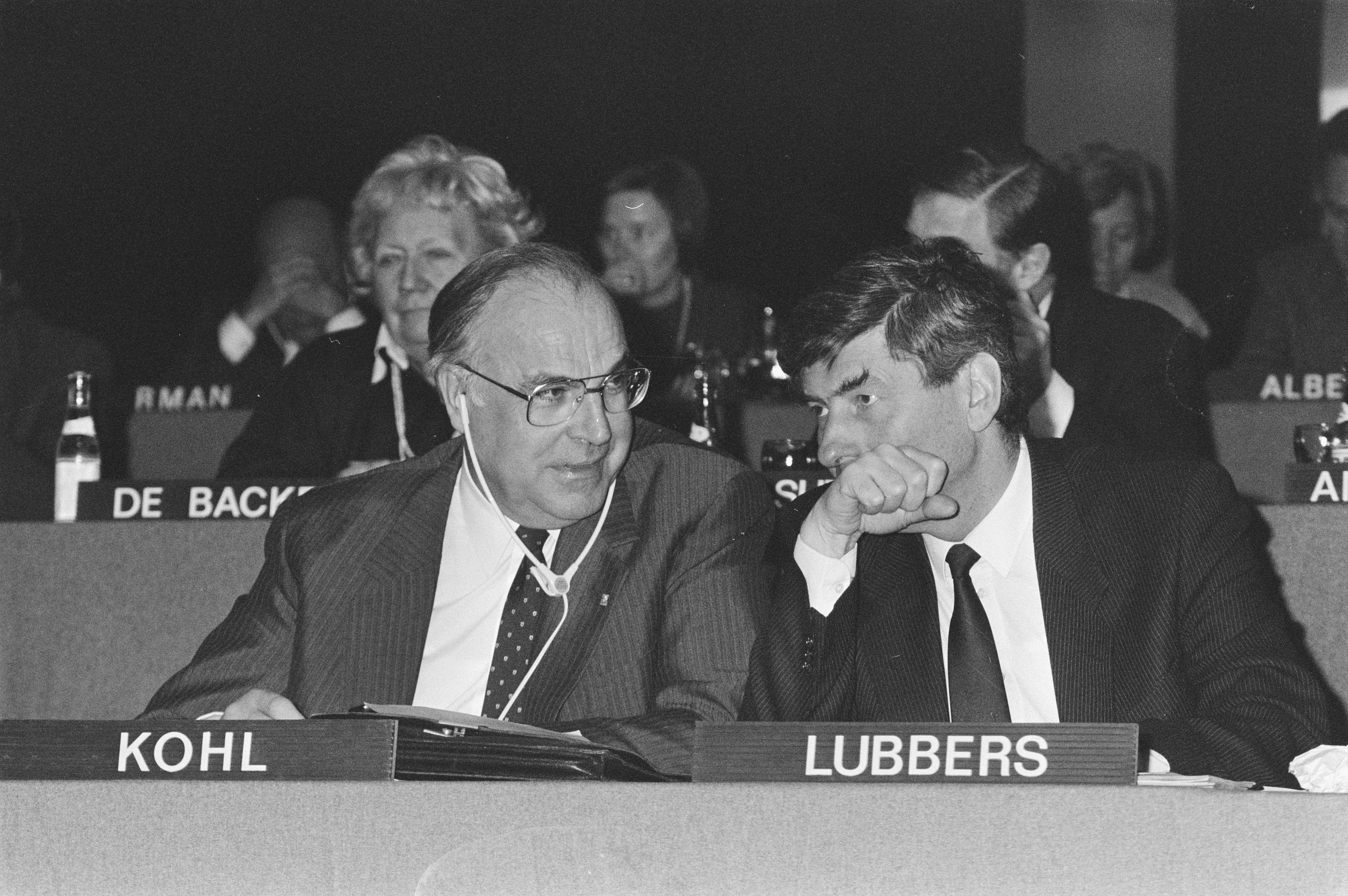
Chancellor of West-Germany Helmut Kohl and Prime Minister Ruud Lubbers at a European People's Party conference in The Hague on 12 April 1986.

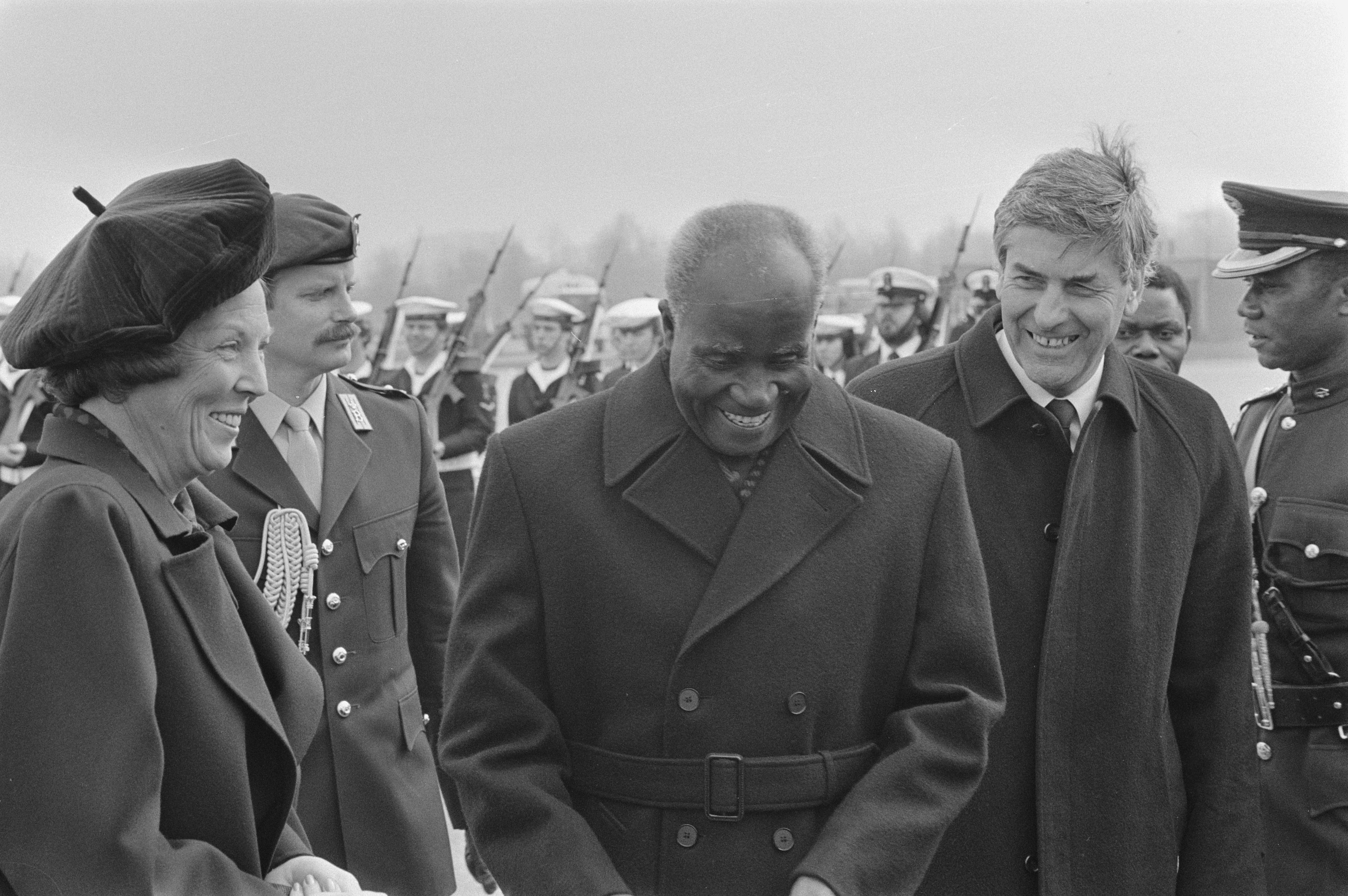
Queen Beatrix, President of Zambia Kenneth Kaunda and Prime Minister Ruud Lubbers at Zestienhoven Airport on 13 April 1986.

== Cabinet members ==
Ministers		Title/Ministry/Portfolio(s)			Term of office	Party
Ruud Lubbers	Ruud Lubbers (1939–2018)	Prime Minister	General Affairs		4 November 1982 – 22 Augustus 1994^{[Continued]}	Christian; Democratic Appeal
Gijs van Aardenne	Gijs van Aardenne (1930–1995)	Deputy Prime; Minister	Economic Affairs		4 November 1982 – 14 July 1986	People's Party for Freedom and Democracy
Gijs van Aardenne	Gijs van Aardenne (1930–1995)	Minister	Economic Affairs		4 November 1982 – 14 July 1986	People's Party for Freedom and Democracy
Koos Rietkerk	Koos Rietkerk (1927–1986)	Minister	Interior		4 November 1982 – 20 February 1986^{[Died]}	People's Party for Freedom and Democracy
Frits Korthals Altes	Frits; Korthals Altes (1931–2025)	Minister	Interior		20 February 1986 – 12 March 1986^{[Ad Interim]}	People's Party for Freedom and Democracy
Rudolf de Korte	Rudolf de Korte (1936–2020)	Minister	Interior		12 March 1986 – 14 July 1986	People's Party for Freedom and Democracy
Hans van den Broek	Hans van den Broek (1936–2025)	Minister	Foreign Affairs		4 November 1982 – 3 January 1993^{[Continued]}	Christian; Democratic Appeal
Onno Ruding	Onno Ruding (born 1939)	Minister	Finance		4 November 1982 – 7 November 1989^{[Continued]}	Christian; Democratic Appeal
Frits Korthals Altes	Frits; Korthals Altes (1931–2025)	Minister	Justice		4 November 1982 – 7 November 1989^{[Continued]}	People's Party for Freedom and Democracy
Job de Ruiter	Job de Ruiter (1930–2015)	Minister	Defence		4 November 1982 – 14 July 1986	Christian; Democratic Appeal
Elco Brinkman	Elco Brinkman (1948–2026)	Minister	Welfare, Health and Culture		4 November 1982 – 7 November 1989^{[Continued]}	Christian; Democratic Appeal
Jan de Koning	Jan de Koning (1926–1994)	Minister	Social Affairs and Employment		4 November 1982 – 3 February 1987^{[Continued]}	Christian; Democratic Appeal
Jan de Koning	Jan de Koning (1926–1994)	Minister	Interior	• Netherlands; Antilles and Aruba Affairs	29 May 1982 – 7 November 1989^{[Retained]} ^{[Continued]}	Christian; Democratic Appeal
Wim Deetman	Wim Deetman (born 1945)	Minister	Education and Sciences		29 May 1982 – 14 September 1989^{[Retained]} ^{[Continued]}	Christian; Democratic Appeal
Neelie Kroes	Neelie Kroes (born 1941)	Minister	Transport and Water Management		4 November 1982 – 7 November 1989^{[Continued]}	People's Party for Freedom and Democracy
Pieter Winsemius	Pieter Winsemius (born 1942)	Minister	Housing, Spatial; Planning and the Environment		4 November 1982 – 14 July 1986	People's Party for Freedom and Democracy
Gerrit Braks	Gerrit Braks (1933–2017)	Minister	Agriculture and Fisheries		4 November 1982 – 18 September 1990^{[Continued]}	Christian; Democratic Appeal
Minister without portfolio		Title/Ministry/Portfolio(s)			Term of office	Party
Eegje Schoo	Eegje Schoo (born 1944)	Minister	Foreign Affairs	• Development; Cooperation	4 November 1982 – 14 July 1986	People's Party for Freedom and Democracy
State Secretaries		Title/Ministry/Portfolio(s)			Term of office	Party
Marius van Amelsvoort	Marius van Amelsvoort (1930–2006)	State Secretary	Interior	• Municipalities • Emergency; Services • Emergency; Management	8 November 1982 – 14 July 1986	Christian; Democratic Appeal
Wim van Eekelen	Wim van Eekelen (1931–2025)	State Secretary^{[Title]}	Foreign Affairs	• European Union • Benelux	5 November 1982 – 14 July 1986	People's Party for Freedom and Democracy
Henk Koning	Henk Koning (1933–2016)	State Secretary	Finance	• Fiscal Policy • Tax and Customs • Governmental; Budget	4 November 1982 – 7 November 1989^{[Continued]}	People's Party for Freedom and Democracy
Virginie Korte-van Hemel	Virginie Korte- van Hemel (1929–2014)	State Secretary	Justice	• Immigration and Asylum • Civil Law • Youth Justice • Penitentiaries • Gambling	8 November 1982 – 7 November 1989^{[Continued]}	Christian; Democratic Appeal
Piet van Zeil	Piet van Zeil (1927–2012)	State Secretary	Economic Affairs	• Small and Medium-sized; Businesses • Regional; Development • Consumer; Protection • Tourism	11 September 1981 – 22 June 1986^{[Retained]} ^{[App]}	Christian; Democratic Appeal
Frits Bolkestein	Frits Bolkestein (1933–2025)	State Secretary	Economic Affairs	• Trade and Export^{[Title]}	4 November 1982 – 14 July 1986	People's Party for Freedom and Democracy
Jan van Houwelingen	Jan van Houwelingen (1939–2013)	State Secretary	Defence)	• Equipment	14 September 1981 – 7 November 1989^{[Retained]} ^{[Continued]}	Christian; Democratic Appeal
Charl Schwietert	Charl Schwietert (born 1943)	State Secretary	Defence)	• Human; Resources	8 November 1982 – 11 November 1982^{[Res]}	People's Party for Freedom and Democracy
Willem Hoekzema	Willem Hoekzema (born 1939)	State Secretary	Defence)	• Human; Resources	19 November 1982 – 14 July 1986	People's Party for Freedom and Democracy
Joop van der Reijden	Joop van der Reijden (1927–2006)	State Secretary	Welfare, Health and Culture	• Primary; Healthcare • Social Services • Elderly Care • Disability Policy • Medical Ethics	5 November 1982 – 14 July 1986	Christian; Democratic Appeal
Louw de Graaf	Louw de Graaf (1930–2020)	State Secretary	Social Affairs and Employment	• Social Security • Unemployment • Occupational; Safety	5 November 1982 – 3 February 1987^{[Continued]}	Christian; Democratic Appeal
Annelien Kappeyne van de Coppello	Annelien; Kappeyne van de Coppello (1936–1990)	State Secretary	Social Affairs and Employment	• Disability Policy • Family Policy • Equality • Emancipation	8 November 1982 – 14 July 1986	People's Party for Freedom and Democracy
Nell Ginjaar-Maas	Nell Ginjaar-Maas (1931–2012)	State Secretary	Education and Sciences	• Secondary; Education • Adult; Education	5 November 1982 – 7 November 1989^{[Continued]}	People's Party for Freedom and Democracy
Gerard van Leijenhorst	Gerard van Leijenhorst (1928–2001)	State Secretary	Education and Sciences	• Primary; Education	8 November 1982 – 14 July 1986	Christian; Democratic Appeal
Jaap Scherpenhuizen	Jaap; Scherpenhuizen (1934–2012)	State Secretary	Transport and Water Management	• Public; Infrastructure • Public; Transport • Postal Service • Weather; Forecasting	8 November 1982 – 14 July 1986	People's Party for Freedom and Democracy
Gerrit Brokx	Gerrit Brokx (1933–2002)	State Secretary	Housing, Spatial; Planning and the Environment	• Urban Planning • Public Housing • Spatial Planning	5 November 1982 – 23 October 1986^{[Continued]}	Christian; Democratic Appeal
Ad Ploeg	Ad Ploeg (1927–1994)	State Secretary	Agriculture and Fisheries	• Food Policy • Environmental; Policy • Nature • Fisheries • Forestry • Animal Welfare	8 November 1982 – 14 July 1986	People's Party for Freedom and Democracy

^{Resigned}
^{Retained from the previous cabinet}
^{Continued in the next cabinet}
^{Ad Interim}
^{Died in Office}
^{Designated with the diplomatic rank of Minister}
^{Appointed as Mayor of Heerlen}

== Trivia ==
- Three cabinet members would later serve as European Commissioner: Hans van den Broek (1993–1999), Neelie Kroes (2004–2014) and Frits Bolkestein (1999–2004)
- Ruud Lubbers became the youngest Dutch Prime Minister at the age of 43 years, 181 days.
