= Jack de Vries =

Jack de Vries may refer to:

- Jack de Vries (politician) (born 1968), Dutch politician
- Jack de Vries (soccer) (born 2002), American soccer player
