= Alphen aan den Rijn shopping mall shooting =

Mass shooting in Alphen aan den Rijn, Netherlands

- The location of Alphen aan den Rijn in the Netherlands
- Location: 52°08′42″N 4°40′28″E; Alphen aan den Rijn, Netherlands
- Date: 9 April 2011; 15 years ago 12:08
- Target: Ridderhof Mall
- Attack type: Mass shooting, mass murder, murder–suicide
- Weapons: .22 caliber Smith & Wesson M&P15-22 semi-automatic rifle; .45-caliber Colt M1911 pistol; .44-caliber Taurus Raging Bull revolver (suicide)
- Deaths: 7 (including the perpetrator)
- Injuries: 17
- Perpetrator: Tristan van der Vlis
- Motive: Inconclusive (possibly Columbine effect)

On 9 April 2011, six people were killed by a gunman who entered the Ridderhof mall in Alphen aan den Rijn, Netherlands, a town approximately 33 kilometres (21 mi) south-west of Amsterdam. Using a rifle, 24-year-old Tristan van der Vlis shot several people and then killed himself, reportedly with a different firearm. There were seven deaths, including the killer, and 17 wounded, making it the deadliest attack in the Netherlands since the 2009 attack on the Dutch royal family and the deadliest mass shooting by a lone gunman in Dutch history.

== Shooting ==
At 9:00, Tristan Van der Vlis woke up. He told his parents that he would be going to the shooting range. Between 11:33 and 11:45, Van der Vlis left his parents' apartment. He was wearing camouflage pants, a dark jacket, a pentagram ring, and a shirt that says: "Religions of the world". He also wore a bulletproof vest underneath his clothes and a belt for carrying magazines. He quickly drove to the Ridderhof mall, parking his black Mercedes car in front of the emergency exit of a drugstore.

Van der Vlis brought a semi-automatic Smith & Wesson M&P15-22 equipped with a red dot sight, a stainless steel Colt M1911 .45-caliber pistol, and a Taurus Raging Bull .44 Magnum revolver to the mall. He first got out of his car and walked to his car's trunk to retrieve his rifle. He then started walking south and aimed his rifle at a man putting groceries in his car. Van der Vlis shot the man several times, killing him. He then aimed the rifle at two friends next to the mall's staircase. He fired multiple rounds at the men, shooting one of them. He also shot a nearby man who witnessed the two friends being shot at. Van der Vlis then walked up the stairs to the mall while firing down at the injured victims he previously targeted. A man exited the mall to approach Van der Vlis while he was on top of the stairwell. Van der Vlis turned towards the man and shot him once in the stomach. The man ran back into the mall and started warning people about the active shooter. Van der Vlis reloaded his rifle.

Van der Vlis opened the door to the mall at 12:08:40. Just as he entered the mall, he immediately began opening fire at an elderly couple and their adopted daughter in front of the Hans Textiel store. While he was firing at the family, he also injured two more people further into the mall and an adult woman who was near the elderly couple. The elderly couple were killed while the adopted daughter was unharmed. Van der Vlis reloaded the rifle again as he walked towards a fish store. In front of the fish store, Van der Vlis shot and killed a man in a mobility scooter. He then began to fire indiscriminately at people north of him, primarily at the people in front of the C1000 supermarket. He also reloaded in front of a pet store to continue shooting at the people in front of him. During those volleys, he injured a total of seven people in the C1000 supermarket, the escalators, and the north hallway.

After walking north, Van der Vlis reloaded his rifle and turned west into a narrow hallway of the mall. He shot a man in the hallway, injuring him. After shooting the man, Van der Vlis dropped his rifle and revealed his two handguns, carrying one in each hand. He began walking west while firing into the stores before turning east. As he turned east, he fatally shot a woman in a mobility scooter with the Colt pistol. After shooting the woman, Van der Vlis reloaded his Colt pistol while walking east. Van der Vlis turned around again and walked west. As he walked, he fired several more rounds into the stores, killing another woman and injuring two more people. Van der Vlis would empty his Colt pistol after firing into the stores.

After shooting up the stores, Van der Vlis continued walking west then turned south towards an Albert Heijn supermarket. He threw his Colt pistol at a flower display before walking up to the checkout of the supermarket. Van der Vlis kneeled down and pressed the Taurus revolver against his head. At 12:11:11., he fatally shot himself with the revolver.

Van der Vlis fired 119 rounds during the shooting. A later investigation has determined Van der Vlis fired 102 rounds from the .22 rifle, 16 rounds from the Colt pistol, and 1 round from the Taurus revolver. It is also determined that he brought to the mall: five 25-round magazines for the rifle, two 8-round magazines for the Colt pistol, and 12 bullets for the Taurus revolver. He killed six people and injuring another 17 before he took the revolver, and took his own life. Many shoppers in the centre panicked before it was evacuated and cordoned off. Later that day one of the injured victims died from their injuries, raising the total number of deceased to seven. The gunman had left a note in his car stating that explosives had been left in three malls in the city; these malls were subsequently evacuated. Children were among the victims, but they had only mild injuries. Among the dead were three men aged 80, 49 and 42, and three women aged 91, 68 and 45. The first victim was a poet and journalist from Syria who had escaped an assassination attempt, only to be killed by Van der Vlis after he fled to the Netherlands. All of Van der Vlis' victims were shot at indiscriminately.

== Perpetrator ==
Tristan van der Vlis

The shooter was 24-year-old Tristan van der Vlis (June 13, 1986 in Alphen aan den Rijn - April 9, 2011 in Alphen aan den Rijn) who lived in an apartment complex in Alphen aan den Rijn with his parents. He had lived in Alphen since his childhood. According to the police, he was a member of a shooting association and possessed three firearms. He had a history of psychological and psychiatric problems, including paranoid schizophrenia; in 2006 he spent 10 days in a closed institution after attempting suicide. He wanted to punish God by murdering "his creatures".

Van der Vlis was obsessed with the 1999 Columbine High School massacre and chose the date of 9 April because it would have been the 30th birthday of gunman Eric Harris. Van der Vlis started shooting at 12:08 pm because that was the time when Harris committed suicide.

Van der Vlis was the grandson of Hennaarderadeel and Franeker mayor Kornelis van der Vlis, who was a member of the National Socialist Movement during World War II. He was also the nephew of former Dutch General Arie van der Vlis, who also served as the Chief of the Defence Staff from 1992 to 1994.

== Casualties ==
- Ali van Doorn (91)
- Frans Deutekom (80)
- Margriet ter Haar (68)
- Michael Boezaard (49)
- Constanze Boezaard-Bierman (45)
- Nadim Youssef (42)

== Response ==
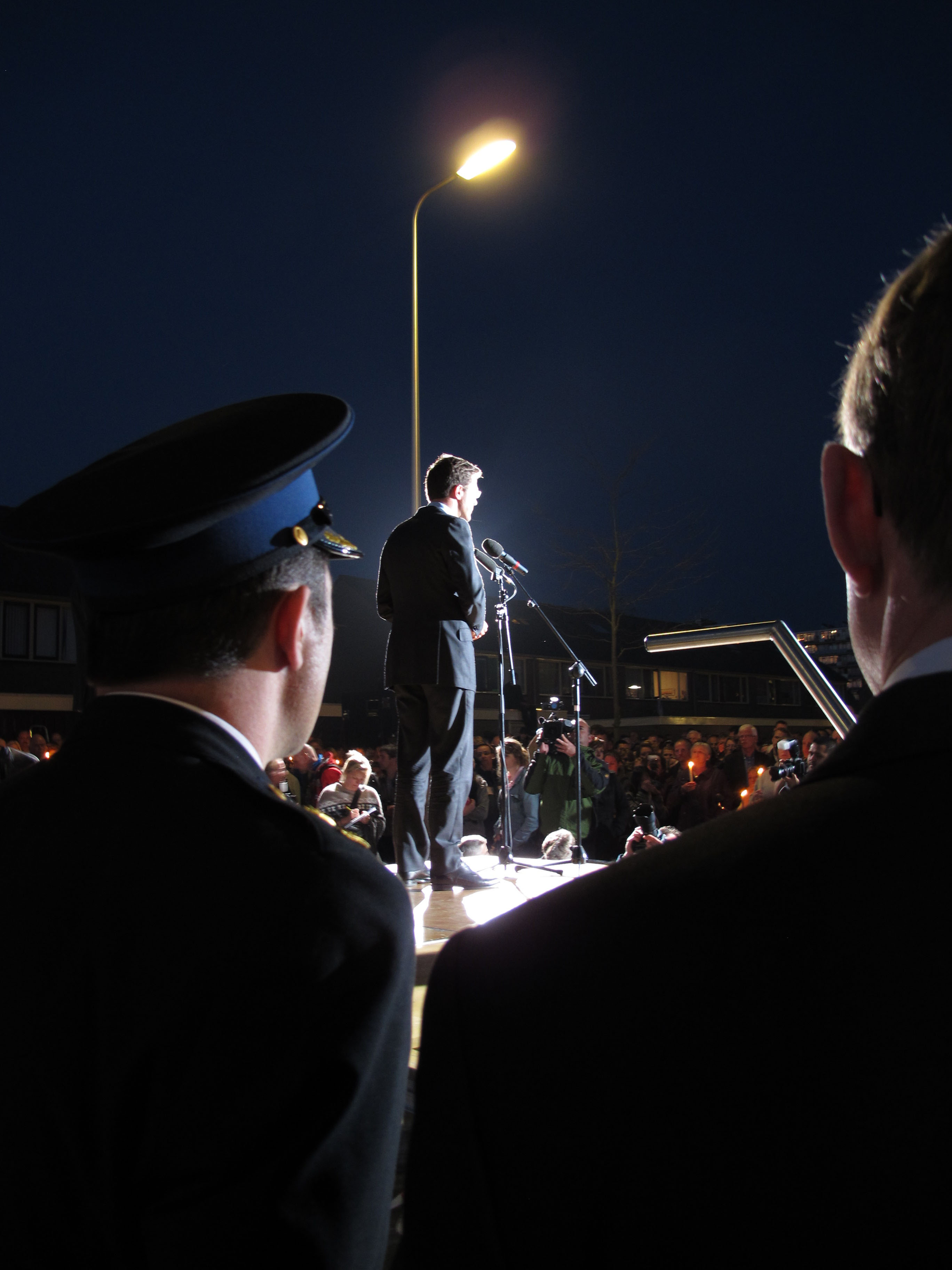
Prime Minister Rutte gives a speech at the remembrance ceremony on 10 April 2011

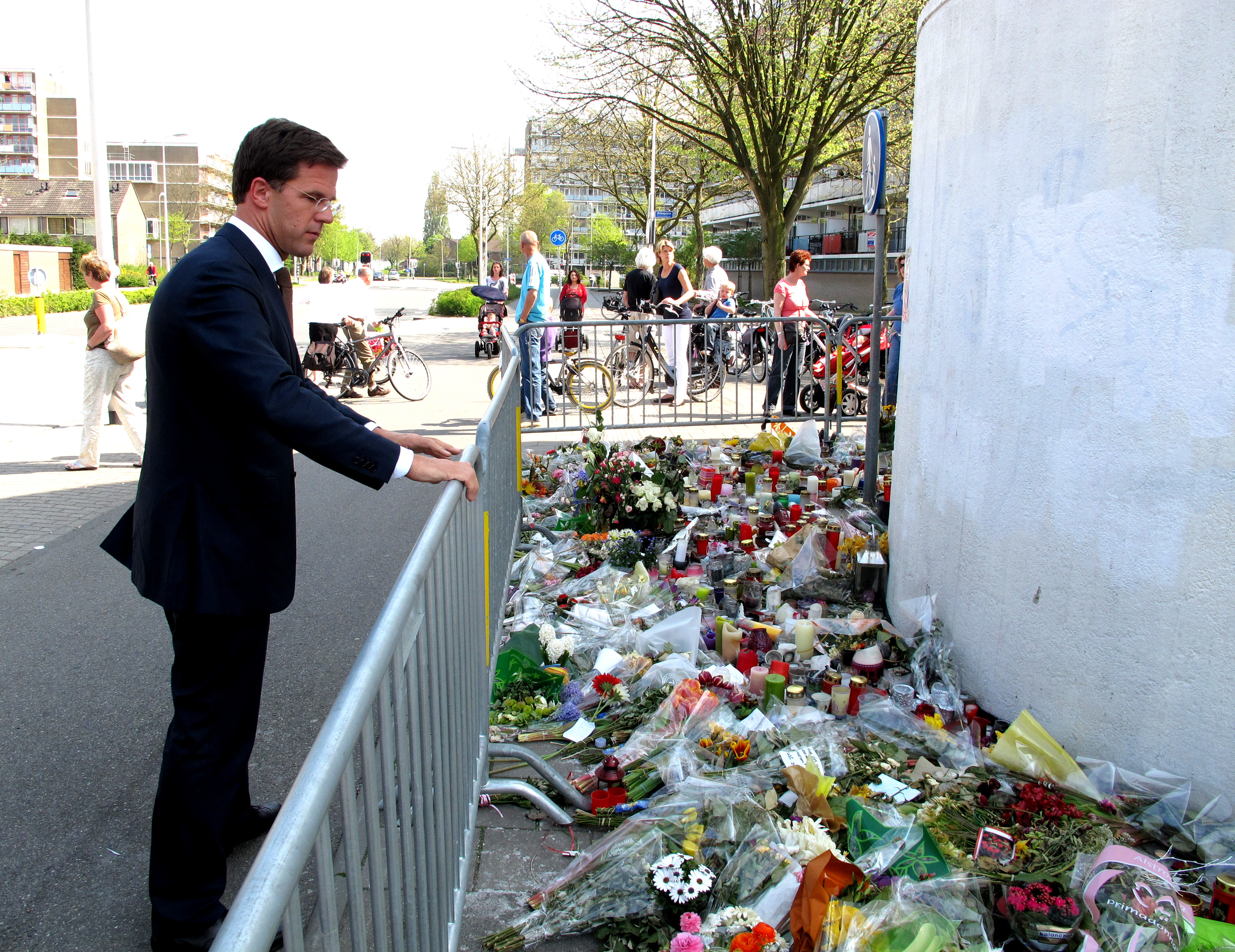
PM Mark Rutte at the Ridderhof memorial on 20 April 2011

The Netherlands Government Information Service, through a brief statement on Twitter, said Queen Beatrix was "speechless because of the great loss and sadness;" and politicians such as Minister of Security and Justice Ivo Opstelten expressed feelings of shock and tragedy.

Several thousand people attended a memorial service at the mall on 10 April. Prime Minister Mark Rutte, Minister Opstelten and acting Mayor of Alphen aan den Rijn Bas Eenhoorn were also present.

Shortly after the shooting, police arrested a 17-year-old boy who threatened to carry out another mass shooting. The teenager from Rotterdam posted on Twitter: "Haha Iraq is also coming to the Netherlands. This man in Alphen already has 6 kills on his name. I'm going to outdo him." After a backlash, the boy deleted the post and claimed it was a joke. Since then, four other people were arrested for making similar threats on Twitter.

== Aftermath ==
On 20 September 2019, the Supreme Court of the Netherlands (Hoge Raad) concluded that the police of Alphen aan den Rijn was at fault for distributing a firearms license to the perpetrator who obviously had a mental illness. Therefore, the police were held accountable for all damages suffered by the victims and their relatives. After the shooting the police in the Netherlands had a surge of revoked licences and currently maintain a stricter enforcement of law regarding the possession of firearms.

== See also ==
- Utrecht tram shooting (2019)
- 2023 Rotterdam shootings
