= Chair of the People's Party for Freedom and Democracy =

Chairman of the People's Party for Freedom and Democracy
- Partijvoorzitter van de Volkspartij voor Vrijheid en Democratie
- Incumbent; Eric Wetzels since 7 October 2022
- Member of: Party Board
- Formation: 28 January 1948; 78 years ago
- First holder: Dirk Stikker
- Deputy: Eric Wetzels (Vice Chair)

The Chair of the People's Party for Freedom and Democracy is the party chair, chief administrator and manager of the People's Party for Freedom and Democracy (Dutch: Volkspartij voor Vrijheid en Democratie, VVD) in the Netherlands. The current chair is Eric Wetzels.

== History ==
The VVD chair is the head of the party board and leads several committees. The duties of the chair are typically concerned with the party membership as a whole, and the activities of the party organization, the internal party governance, its finances and the Telders Foundation think tank.

The Chair plays an important role in strategies to recruit and retain members, in campaign fundraising.

Due to a separation of power in the VVD's structure the chair is relatively weak and merely controls the party organization. The leader of the People's Party for Freedom and Democracy is the most senior politician within the People's Party for Freedom and Democracy and decides over the party's political course.

== Chairs ==
| Chair | | Term of office | Positions |
|---|---|---|---|
| Dirk Stikker | Dirk Stikker (1897–1979) | 28 January 1948 – 7 August 1948 (192 days) | Member of the Senate (1945–1948); Chairman of the Freedom Party (1946–1948); Leader of the Freedom Party (1946–1948); Minister of Foreign Affairs (1948–1952); Ambassador to Iceland (1952–1958); Ambassador to the United Kingdom (1952–1958); Permanent Representative to the OECD (1958–1961); Permanent Representative to NATO (1958–1961); Secretary General of NATO (1961–1964) |
| Pieter Oud | Pieter Oud (1886–1968) | 7 August 1948 – 9 April 1949 (245 days)^{[Acting]} | Member of the House of Representatives (1917–1933, 1937–1938, 1948–1963); Minister of Finance (1933–1937); Leader of the Free-thinking Democratic League (1935–1938); Parliamentary leader in the House of Representatives (1937–1938, 1948–1963); Mayor of Rotterdam (1938–1941, 1945–1952); Member of the Provincial council of South Holland (1939–1941); Leader of the People's Party for Freedom and Democracy (1948–1963) |
| Pieter Oud | Pieter Oud (1886–1968) | 9 April 1949 – 9 November 1963 (14 years, 214 days) | Member of the House of Representatives (1917–1933, 1937–1938, 1948–1963); Minister of Finance (1933–1937); Leader of the Free-thinking Democratic League (1935–1938); Parliamentary leader in the House of Representatives (1937–1938, 1948–1963); Mayor of Rotterdam (1938–1941, 1945–1952); Member of the Provincial council of South Holland (1939–1941); Leader of the People's Party for Freedom and Democracy (1948–1963) |
| Kornelis van der Pols | Kornelis van der Pols (1906–1995) | 9 November 1963 – 29 March 1969 (5 years, 140 days) | |
| Haya van Someren | Haya van Someren (1926–1980) | 29 March 1969 – 15 March 1975 (5 years, 351 days) | Member of the House of Representatives (1959–1968); Member of the Provincial council of South Holland (1966–1969); Member of the Senate (1974–1980); Parliamentary leader in the Senate (1976–1980) |
| Frits Korthals Altes | Frits; Korthals Altes (1931–2025) | 15 March 1975 – 22 May 1981 (6 years, 68 days) | Member of the Senate (1981–1982, 1991–2001); Minister of Justice (1982–1989); Minister of the Interior (1986, 1987); Member of the House of Representatives (1989–1991); Parliamentary leader in the Senate (1995–1997); President of the Senate (1997–2001); Minister of State (2001–2025) (Title of honor) |
| Jan Kamminga | Jan Kamminga (born 1947) | 22 May 1981 – 29 November 1986 (5 years, 191 days) | Member of the Municipal council of Groningen (1974–1980); Queen's commissioner of Gelderland (1997–2005) |
| Leendert Ginjaar | Leendert Ginjaar (1928–2003) | 29 November 1986 – 4 October 1991 (4 years, 309 days) | Minister of Health and Environment (1977–1981); Minister for Science Policy (1979); Member of the Senate (1981–2003); Chair of the Health Council (1985–1996); Parliamentary leader in the Senate (1997–1999) |
| | Dian van Leeuwen-Schut (born 1939) | 4 October 1991 – 27 May 1994 (2 years, 235 days) | Member of the Municipal council of Rotterdam (1968–1970); Member of the Provincial council of South Holland (1983–1984); Member of the Senate (1991–1995) |
| Willem Hoekzema | Willem Hoekzema (born 1939) | 27 May 1994 – 28 May 1999 (5 years, 1 day) | Member of the Provincial council of Utrecht (1974–1975); Member of the Municipal council of Rhenen (1974–1975); Mayor of Coevorden (1975–1982); State Secretary for Defence (1982–1986); Mayor of Huizen (1987–1995); Mayor of Den Helder (1995–2001); Member of the Senate (2003–2007) |
| Bas Eenhoorn | Bas Eenhoorn (born 1946) | 28 May 1999 – 28 November 2003 (4 years, 184 days) | Mayor of Schiermonnikoog (1976–1983); Mayor of Voorburg (1983–1996); Mayor of Lansingerland (2007); Mayor of Kaag en Braassem (2009–2010); Mayor of Alphen aan den Rijn (2010–2012); Mayor of Vlaardingen (2017); Mayor of Amstelveen (2017–2019) |
| Jan van Zanen | Jan van Zanen (born 1961) | 28 November 2003 – 23 May 2008 (4 years, 177 days) | Member of the Municipal council of Utrecht (1990–2002); Alderman of Utrecht (1998–2005); Mayor of Amstelveen (2005–2014); Mayor of Utrecht (2014–2020); Mayor of The Hague (since 2020) |
| Ivo Opstelten | Ivo Opstelten (born 1944) | 23 May 2008 – 14 October 2010 (2 years, 144 days) | Mayor of Dalen (1972–1977); Mayor of Doorn (1977–1980); Mayor of Delfzijl (1980–1987); Mayor of Beerta (1983–1984); Mayor of Utrecht (1992–1999); Mayor of Rotterdam (1999–2009); Mayor of Tilburg (2009–2010); Minister of Security and Justice (2010–2015) |
| Mark Verheijen | Mark Verheijen (born 1976) | 14 October 2010 – 22 May 2011 (220 days) | Member of the Municipal council of Grubbenvorst (1998–2000); Member of the Municipal council of Venlo (2001–2006, 2018–2022); Member of the Provincial council of Limburg (2003–2007); Alderman of Venlo (2006–2011); Member of the Provincial executive of Limburg (2011–2012); Member of the House of Representatives (2012–2015); Mayor of Etten-Leur (2023); Mayor of Wijdemeren (since 2023) |
| Benk Korthals | Benk Korthals (born 1944) | 22 May 2011 – 14 June 2014 (3 years, 23 days) | Member of the House of Representatives (1982–1998, 2002); Minister of Justice (1998–2002); Minister of Defence (2002) |
| Henry Keizer | Henry Keizer (1960–2019) | 14 June 2014 – 18 May 2017 (2 years, 338 days) | |
| | Eric Wetzels (born 1959) | 18 May 2017 – 25 November 2017 (191 days) | |
| Christianne van der Wal | Christianne van der Wal (born 1973) | 25 November 2017 – 10 January 2022 (4 years, 46 days) | Member of the Municipal council of Harderwijk (2010–2014); Alderman of Harderwijk (2014–2019); Member of the Provincial executive of Gelderland (2019–2022); Minister for Nature and Nitrogen Policy (2022–2024); Member of the House of Representatives (2023–2025) |
| Onno Hoes | Onno Hoes (born 1961) | 10 January 2022 – 7 October 2022 (270 days) | Member of the Provincial council of North Brabant (1992–2003); Member of the Municipal council of 's-Hertogenbosch (1993–1998); Member of the Provincial executive of North Brabant (2001–2010); Mayor of Maastricht (2010–2015); Mayor of Haarlemmermeer (2017–2019); Mayor of Roermond (2022–2023); Mayor of Tilburg (2025–2026) |
| | Eric Wetzels (born 1959) | 7 October 2022 – 10 December 2025 (3 years, 64 days) | |
| | Ton van Nimwegen (born 1969) | 10 December 2025 – Incumbent (271 days) | |

== Vice Chairs ==
- Pieter Oud (28 January 1948 – 8 April 1949)
- Harm van Riel (8 April 1949 – 15 May 1963)
- Johan Witteveen (15 May 1963 – 24 July 1963)
- Hans Roelen (24 July 1963 – 16 July 1969)
- Henk Talsma (16 July 1969 – 1978)
- Hendrik Toxopeus (1978 – 1979)
- Jan Kamminga (1979 – 22 May 1981)
- Liesbeth Tuijnman (22 May 1981 – December 1985)
- Ivo Opstelten (February 1986 – 22 May 1993)
- Jan Gmelich Meijling (22 May 1993 – 22 Augustus 1994)
- Ronald Haafkens (22 Augustus 1994 – 28 May 1999)
- Sari van Heemskerck Pillis-Duvekot (28 May 1999 – 2004; Co-Chair)
- Rudolf Sandberg tot Essenburg (28 May 1999 – 2000; Co-Chair)
- Paul Tirion (2000 – 2001; Co-Chair)
- Mark Harbers (2001 – 2005; Co-Chair)
- Ines Adema (2004 – 4 April 2008; Co-Chair)
- Rogier van der Sande (2005 – 4 April 2008; Co-Chair)
- Mark Verheijen (4 April 2008 – 21 May 2012)
- Wiet de Bruijn (21 May 2012 – 14 June 2014; Co-Chair)
- Robert Reibestein (21 May 2012 – 14 June 2014;Co-Chair)
- Jeannette Baljeu (14 June 2014 – 20 May 2017)
- Eric Wetzels (20 May 2017 – 2020)

== See also ==
- People's Party for Freedom and Democracy
- Leader of the People's Party for Freedom and Democracy
