= Dirk Stikker =

Dutch politician and diplomat (1897–1979)

Dirk Stikker GCVO GBE
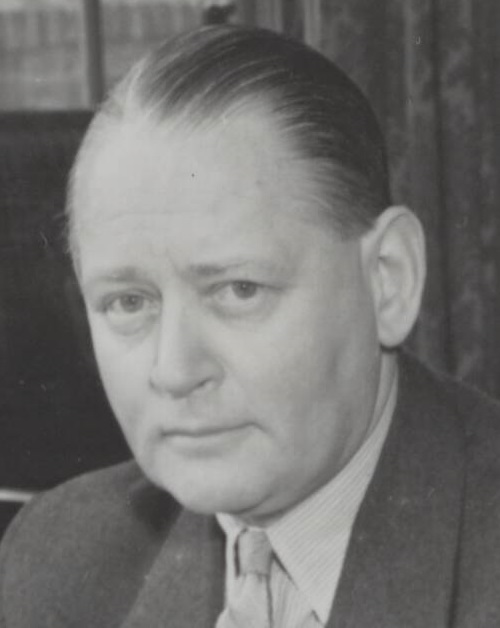
- Stikker in 1952

3rd Secretary General of NATO
- In office 21 April 1961 – 1 August 1964
- Preceded by: Paul-Henri Spaak
- Succeeded by: Manlio Brosio

Permanent Representative of the Netherlands to NATO and the OECD
- In office 15 June 1958 – 21 April 1961
- Preceded by: Eelco van Kleffens
- Succeeded by: Hugo Scheltema

Ambassador of the Netherlands to the United Kingdom
- In office 10 September 1952 – 15 June 1958
- Preceded by: Edgar Michiels van Verduynen
- Succeeded by: Herman van Roijen

Minister of Foreign Affairs
- In office 7 August 1948 – 2 September 1952
- Prime Minister: Willem Drees
- Preceded by: Pim van Boetzelaer van Oosterhout
- Succeeded by: Johan Beyen

Chairman of the People's Party for Freedom and Democracy
- In office 28 January 1948 – 7 August 1948
- Leader: Pieter Oud
- Preceded by: Office established
- Succeeded by: Pieter Oud

Leader of the Freedom Party
- In office 23 March 1946 – 28 January 1948
- Leader: Himself
- Preceded by: Office established
- Succeeded by: Office discontinued

Chairman of the Freedom Party
- In office 23 March 1946 – 28 January 1948
- Leader: Himself
- Preceded by: Office established
- Succeeded by: Office discontinued

Member of the Senate
- In office 20 November 1945 – 7 August 1948
- Parliamentary group: People's Party for Freedom and Democracy (1948); Freedom Party (1946–1948); Liberal State Party (1945–1946)

Personal details
- Born: Dirk Uipko Stikker; 5 February 1897 Winschoten, Netherlands
- Died: 23 December 1979 (aged 82) Wassenaar, Netherlands
- Party: People's Party for Freedom and Democracy (from 1948)
- Other political affiliations: Freedom Party (1946–1948); Liberal State Party (1945–1946)
- Spouse: Catharine van der Scheer (m. 1922)
- Children: Uipko Dirk Stikker (born 1924); Allerd Stikker (born 1928)
- Education: University of Groningen (Bachelor of Laws, Master of Laws)
- Occupation: Politician · Diplomat · civil servant · Businessman · Banker · Corporate director · Nonprofit director · Trade association executive

Dirk Uipko Stikker (5 February 1897 – 23 December 1979) was a Dutch politician and diplomat of the defunct Liberal State Party (LSP), co-founder of the defunct Freedom Party (PvdV) and of the People's Party for Freedom and Democracy (VVD), and businessman. Stikker was known for his abilities as a manager and negotiator. Stikker continued to comment on political affairs as a statesman until his death. He holds the distinction as the first secretary general of NATO from the Netherlands.

== Biography ==
=== Early life ===
Born in Winschoten, he studied law at the University of Groningen. After his studies he began a career in the banking sector. In 1935, he became the director of Heineken International, the famous beer company. He held this post until 1948. In 1945, he was among the organizers of the Stichting van de Arbeid (Dutch Labour Foundation), thus helping to lay the foundation for post-war collective bargaining in the Netherlands.

== Career ==
From 1922 until 1926, Stikker worked as an accountant for the Twentsche Bank, and then as Director of a branch of the bank from 1926 until 1928. Then in 1928 until 1935 Stikker worked as a regional manager for the Twentsche Bank. Stikker worked as member of the management board for Heineken N.V. from 1 July 1935 until 1 August 1948 and as chairman of that board from 1940 until 1948. Following the end of World War II, Queen Wilhelmina ordered a Recall of Parliament and Stikker became a Member of the Senate taking the place of the deceased Samuel van den Bergh, on 20 November 1945. On 23 March 1946, the Liberal State Party was renamed as the Freedom Party. Stikker was one of the co-founders and became the Leader of the Freedom Party and Chairman. On 24 January 1948, the Freedom Party (PvdV) and the Committee-Oud merged to form the People's Party for Freedom and Democracy (VVD). Stikker was one of the co-founders and became the first Chairman of the People's Party for Freedom and Democracy.

After election of 1948 the Leader of the People's Party for Freedom and Democracy and Parliamentary leader of the People's Party for Freedom and Democracy in the House of Representatives Pieter Oud opted to remain in the House of Representatives instead of accepting a ministerial post in the new Cabinet Drees–Van Schaik and endorsed Stikker who had been serving as the Deputy Leader as Minister of Foreign Affairs, taking office on 7 August 1948. The Cabinet Drees–Van Schaik fell on 24 January 1951 and was replaced by the Cabinet Drees I with Stikker continuing as Minister of Foreign Affairs, taking office on 15 March 1951. In February 1952 Stikker announced that he would not stand for the election of 1952. The Cabinet Drees I was succeeded by the Cabinet Drees II on 2 September 1952. Stikker remained in active politics, he was appointed as the Ambassador of the Netherlands to the United Kingdom, serving from 10 September 1952 until 15 June 1958 when he was appointed as the Permanent Representative of the Netherlands to NATO and the OECD. In April 1961 Stikker was nominated as the next Secretary General of NATO. He resigned as Permanent Representative on 21 April 1961 the day he was installed as Secretary General, serving from 21 April 1961 until 1 August 1964.

After his retirement, Stikker occupied numerous seats as a corporate director and nonprofit director for supervisory boards in the business and industry world and for supervisory boards for several international non-governmental organizations and research institutes (Unilever, Van Lanschot, Netherlands Atlantic Association, Carnegie Foundation, Trilateral Commission and the DSM Company) and as an advocate and lobbyist for European integration and serving on several commissions for the European Economic Community and state commissions on behalf of the Dutch government. He served as the Secretary General of NATO from 21 April 1961 until 1 August 1964.

== Politics ==
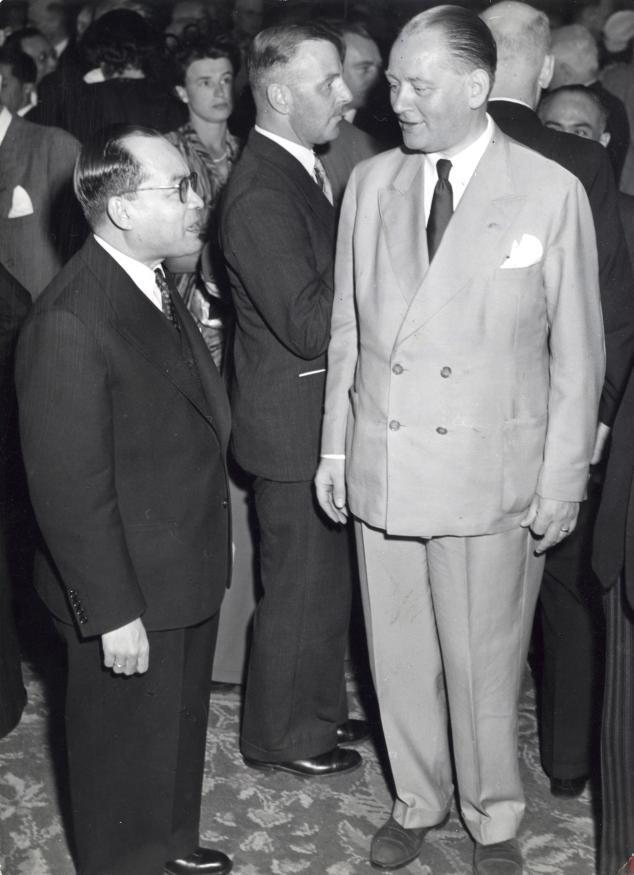
Vice President and Prime Minister of Indonesia Mohammad Hatta and Minister of Foreign Affairs Dirk Stikker during a meeting in The Hague on 25 August 1949

Stikker entered politics in 1945, when he was elected to the Senate of the States General. On 23 March 1946, he co-founded the Partij van de Vrijheid (PvdV, Freedom Party), together with some former members of the pre-war Liberale Staatspartij (LSP, Liberal State Party). On 24 January 1948, the PvdV was absorbed by the Volkspartij voor Vrijheid en Democratie (VVD, Peoples Party for Freedom and Democracy), which is as of 2022 the country's most important Liberal party. Stikker was the VVD's first chairman.

=== Minister of Foreign Affairs ===
In 1948, Stikker became minister of foreign affairs in the first government led by Willem Drees, holding that position until 1951. After his party adopted a no-confidence motion over the government's colonial policy in New Guinea, Stikker resigned on 23 January 1951, prompting the cabinet's fall. He returned to that position less than two months later. The Netherlands played an important role in the creation of NATO and the European Coal and Steel Community during Stikker's time in office as minister of foreign affairs.

=== Ambassador ===
After his ministerial office, Stikker was ambassador to the United Kingdom (1952–1958) and head of the Dutch Permanent Representation to the North Atlantic Council and to the Organization for European Economic Co-operation, the predecessor of the OECD (1958–1961).

=== Secretary General of NATO ===
On 21 April 1961 he succeeded Paul-Henri Spaak to become the third Secretary General of NATO. He resigned due to poor health on 1 August 1964.

== Personal ==
In 1964, Stikker was awarded an honorary doctorate by Brown University. He died in Wassenaar in 1979, aged 82.

== Decorations ==
Honours
Ribbon bar	Honour	Country	Date	Comment
	Grand Cross of the Order of the Oak Crown	Luxembourg	29 April 1949	
	Grand Cross of the Order of the Crown	Belgium	15 September 1950	
	Knight Grand Cross of the Order of the British Empire	United Kingdom	30 May 1951	
	Knight Grand Cross of the Royal Victorian Order	United Kingdom	24 December 1958	
	Knight Grand Cross of the Order of Merit	Italy	9 September 1961	
	Grand Cross of the Legion of Honour	France	1 June 1962	
	Grand Cross of the Order of the Phoenix	Greece	18 November 1962	
	Grand Cross 1st Class of the Order of Merit	Germany	23 May 1963	
	Knight Grand Cross of the Order of Orange-Nassau	Netherlands	30 April 1965	Elevated from Commander (30 September 1952)
	Commander of the Order of the Netherlands Lion	Netherlands	19 February 1972	Elevated from Knight (31 August 1946)

Party political offices
Preceded by Office established	Leader of the Freedom Party; 1946–1948	Succeeded by Office discontinued
Preceded by Office established	Chairman of the Freedom Party; 1946–1948	Succeeded by Office discontinued
Preceded by Office established	Chairman of the People's Party for Freedom and Democracy; 1948	Succeeded by Pieter Oud
Preceded by Office established	Deputy Leader of the People's Party for Freedom and Democracy; 1948–1952	Succeeded by Henk Korthals
Preceded by Office established	Deputy Leader of the People's Party for Freedom and Democracy; 1948–1952	Succeeded by Roelof Zegering Hadders
Political offices
Preceded by Pim van Boetzelaer van Oosterhout	Minister of Foreign Affairs; 1948–1952	Succeeded by Johan Beyen
Diplomatic posts
Preceded by Edgar Michiels van Verduynen	Ambassador of the Netherlands to the United Kingdom; 1952–1958	Succeeded by Herman van Roijen
Preceded by Eelco van Kleffens	Permanent Representative of the Netherlands to NATO; 1958–1961	Succeeded by Hugo Scheltema
Preceded by Paul-Henri Spaak	Secretary General of NATO; 1961–1964	Succeeded by Manlio Brosio
Business positions
Unknown	CFO of Heineken N.V. 1935–1948	Unknown
Preceded by Office established	Chairman of the Employers association 1945–1948	Succeeded by Hans de Koster
