= Cees van der Knaap =

Dutch politician

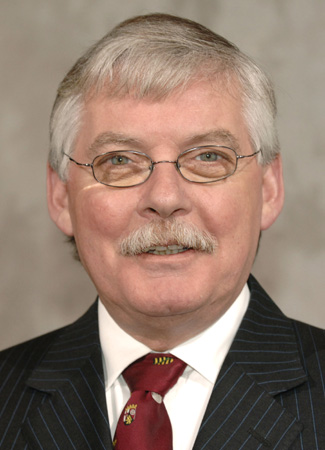
- Van der Knaap in 2007

Mayor of Ede
- In office 21 January 2008 – 1 September 2017
- Preceded by: Tineke Netelenbos
- Succeeded by: René Verhulst

State Secretary for Defence
- In office 22 July 2002 – 18 December 2007
- Preceded by: Henk van Hoof
- Succeeded by: Jack de Vries

Member of the House of Representatives
- In office 30 November 2006 – 22 February 2007
- In office 30 January 2003 – 27 May 2003
- In office 19 May 1998 – 22 July 2002

Personal details
- Born: Cornelis van der Knaap; 27 January 1951 (age 75) Bennekom, Netherlands
- Party: Christian Democratic Appeal

Cornelis (Cees) van der Knaap (born 27 January 1951) is a Dutch politician. He was State Secretary for Defence for the Christian Democratic Appeal (CDA).

== Biography ==
After attending a MULO school, Van der Knaap worked for Vroom & Dreesmann. Between 1970 and 1975 he served as an enlisted soldier in the Royal Netherlands Army. After that he worked for the customs service. Since 1978 he has worked for the National Federation of Christian Trade Unions in the Netherlands, first as district board member, later as a member of the national board of the transport union. In 1992 he became a member of the national board of the federal trade union, first as coordinator working conditions, later as general secretary.

In 1998 Van der Knaap became a member of the House of Representatives for the Christian Democratic Appeal. In 2002 he became State Secretary for Defence in the First Balkenende cabinet, a post he has held until 2008, even though there were considerable mutations between the second Balkenende cabinet, the third cabinet Balkenende and the Fourth Balkenende cabinet. Van der Knaap is a trustee of Jan Peter Balkenende, and has been an important contact between the cabinet and the trade unions in times of crisis.

Van der Knaap has become mayor of Ede in 2008, his successor as State Secretary was Jack de Vries.
