= Bas Eenhoorn =

Dutch politician and management consultant

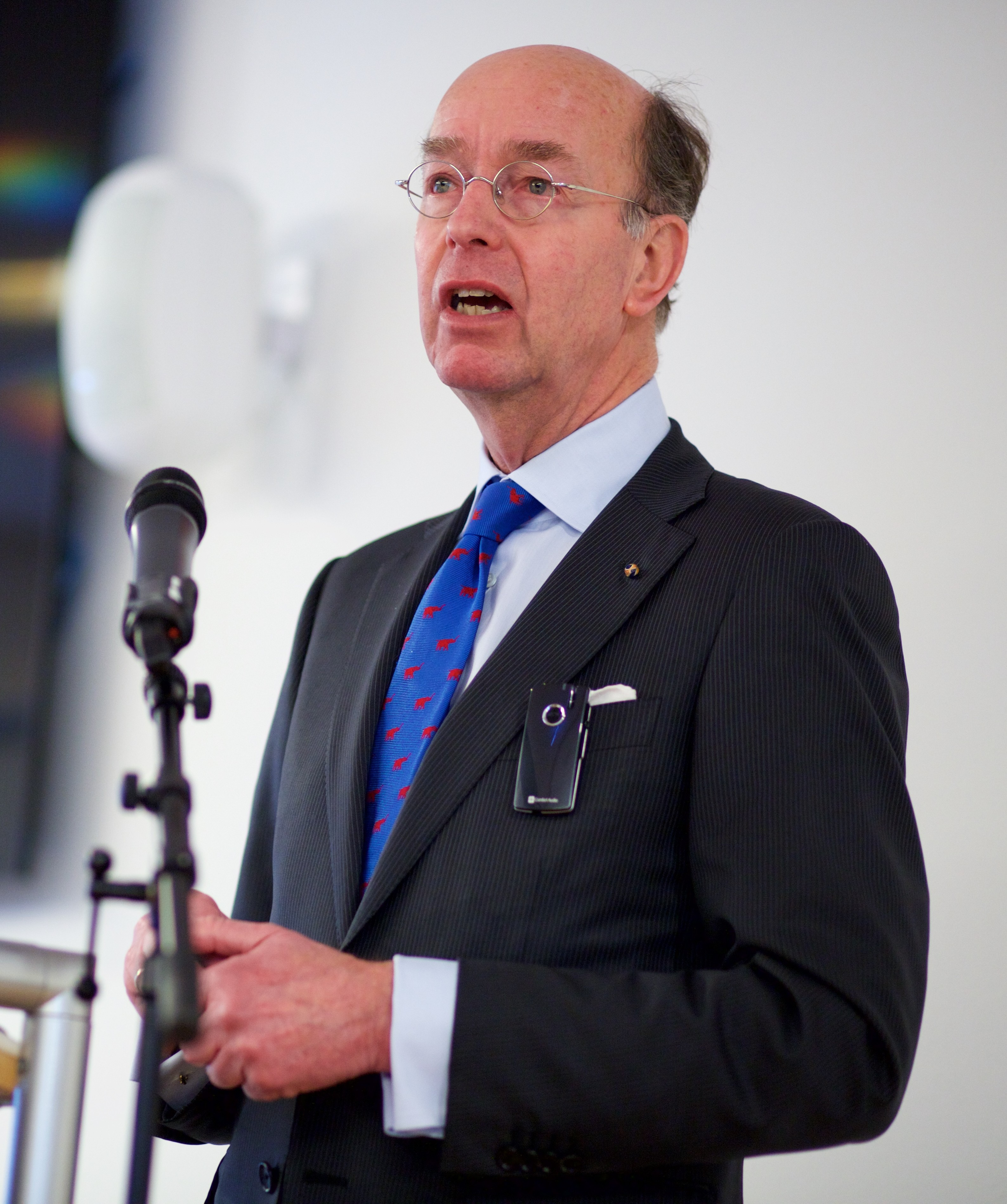
- Eenhoorn in 2015

Mayor of Amstelveen
- In office 1 October 2017 – 28 May 2019; Acting
- Preceded by: Mirjam van 't Veld
- Succeeded by: Tjapko Poppens

Mayor of Vlaardingen
- In office 1 January 2014 – 1 August 2014; Acting
- Preceded by: Tjerk Bruinsma
- Succeeded by: Bert Blase (ad interim)

Mayor of Alphen aan den Rijn
- In office 10 December 2010 – 1 January 2012; Acting
- Preceded by: Wim de Gelder
- Succeeded by: Tjerk Bruinsma (ad interim)

Mayor of Kaag en Braassem
- In office 1 January 2009 – 30 March 2010; Acting
- Preceded by: Office established
- Succeeded by: Marina van der Velde-Menting

Mayor of Lansingerland
- In office 1 January 2007 – 18 September 2007; Acting
- Preceded by: Office established
- Succeeded by: Ewald van Vliet

Chairman of the People's Party for Freedom and Democracy
- In office 28 May 1999 – 28 November 2003
- Leader: Hans Dijkstal (1999–2002); Gerrit Zalm (2002–2003)
- Preceded by: Willem Hoekzema
- Succeeded by: Jan van Zanen

Mayor of Voorburg
- In office 1 January 1983 – 1 January 1996
- Preceded by: Elly den Haan-Groen
- Succeeded by: Wim van Willigenburg (Ad interim)

Mayor of Schiermonnikoog
- In office 30 April 1976 – 1 January 1983
- Preceded by: Kornelis Oosterhuis
- Succeeded by: Hans Boekhoven

Personal details
- Born: Herman Bastiaan Eenhoorn; 14 September 1946 (age 80) Groningen, Netherlands
- Party: People's Party for Freedom and Democracy (from 1973)
- Spouse: Anke van Burgeler (m. 1972)
- Children: 2 children
- Education: University of Groningen (Bachelor of Social Science, Master of Social Science)
- Occupation: Politician · Civil servant · Management consultant · Geographer · Urban planner · Corporate director · Nonprofit director · Trade association executive · Media administrator · Academic administrator
- Website: (in Dutch) baseenhoorn.nl

Herman Bastiaan "Bas" Eenhoorn (born 14 September 1946) is a Dutch politician and management consultant. A member of the People's Party for Freedom and Democracy (VVD), he was party chair from 1999 until 2003.

Eenhoorn served as Mayor of Schiermonnikoog (1976–1983), Voorburg (1983–1996), as well as Acting Mayor of Lansingerland (2007), Kaag en Braassem (2009–2010), Alphen aan den Rijn (2010–2012), Vlaardingen (2014) and Amstelveen (2017–2019). He became well known after giving press conferences in his function as acting mayor after the Alphen aan den Rijn shopping mall shooting on 9 April 2011. He studied social and economic geography with a specialisation in public administration at the University of Groningen.

== Decorations ==
Honours
| Ribbon bar | Honour | Country | Date | Comment |
| | Officer of the Order of Orange-Nassau | Netherlands | 30 April 2004 | |

Civic offices
| Preceded by Office established | National Commissioner for Digital; Governmental Affairs; 2014–2018 | Succeeded by Office discontinued |
Party political offices
| Preceded by Willem Hoekzema | Chairman of the People's Party for Freedom and Democracy; 1999–2003 | Succeeded by Jan van Zanen |
Political offices
| Preceded by Kornelis Oosterhuis | Mayor of Schiermonnikoog; 1976–1983 | Succeeded by Hans Boekhoven |
| Preceded by Elly den Haan-Groen | Mayor of Voorburg; 1983–1996 | Succeeded by Wim van Willigenburg; Ad interim |
| Preceded by Office established | Mayor of Lansingerland; Acting; 2007 | Succeeded by Ewald van Vliet |
| Preceded by Office established | Mayor of Kaag en Braassem; Acting; 2009–2010 | Succeeded by Marina van der Velde-Menting |
| Preceded by Wim de Gelder | Mayor of Alphen aan den Rijn; Acting; 2010–2012 | Succeeded by Tjerk Bruinsma; Ad interim |
| Preceded by Tjerk Bruinsma | Mayor of Vlaardingen; Acting; 2014 | Succeeded by Bert Blase; Ad interim |
| Preceded by Mirjam van 't Veld | Mayor of Amstelveen; Acting; 2017–present | Incumbent |
Media offices
| Preceded by Loek Hermans | Chairman of the Supervisory board of WNL; 2013–present | Incumbent |
