= Henk van Hoof =

Dutch politician

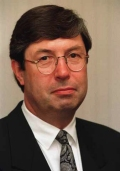
- Van Hoof in 2005

State Secretary for Social Affairs and Employment
- In office 17 June 2004 – 22 February 2007
- Prime Minister: Jan Peter Balkenende
- Preceded by: Mark Rutte
- Succeeded by: Ahmed Aboutaleb

Mayor of Delfzijl
- In office 16 August 2003 – 1 May 2004; Ad interim
- Preceded by: Annemarie Jorritsma (Acting)
- Succeeded by: Maritje Appel

State Secretary for Defence
- In office 3 August 1998 – 22 July 2002
- Prime Minister: Wim Kok
- Preceded by: Jan Gmelich Meijling
- Succeeded by: Cees van der Knaap

Member of the House of Representatives
- In office 23 May 2002 – 30 January 2003
- In office 5 November 1991 – 3 August 1998
- Parliamentary group: People's Party for Freedom and Democracy

Personal details
- Born: Hendrikus Andreas Lambertus van Hoof; 9 November 1947 (age 78) Nijmegen, Netherlands
- Party: People's Party for Freedom and Democracy (from 1974)
- Education: Royal Naval College
- Occupation: Politician · Naval officer · Trade Union leader · Businessman · Corporate director · Nonprofit director · Trade association executive · Education administrator · Lobbyist

Military service
- Allegiance: Netherlands
- Branch/service: Royal Netherlands Navy
- Years of service: 1966–1981 (Active duty); 1981–1997 (Reserve)
- Rank: Commander
- Unit: Naval squadron
- Battles/wars: Cold War

Hendrikus Andreas Lambertus "Henk" van Hoof (born 9 November 1947) is a retired Dutch politician of the People's Party for Freedom and Democracy (VVD) and naval officer.

Van Hoof served in the Royal Netherlands Navy from April 1965 until May 1981 and as a trade union leader for the Royal Association of Navy Officers from May 1981 until November 1991 and served as General-Secretary from July 1990 until November 1991. Van Hoof became a Member of the House of Representatives after Henk Koning was appointed as President of the Court of Audit, taking office on 5 November 1991. After the election of 1998 Van Hoof was appointment as State Secretary for Defence in the Cabinet Kok II, taking office on 3 August 1998. The Cabinet Kok II resigned on 16 April 2002 following the conclusions of the NIOD report into the Srebrenica massacre during the Bosnian War and continuing to serve in a demissionary capacity. After the election of 2002 Van Hoof returned as a Member of the House of Representatives, taking office on 23 May 2002. Following the cabinet formation of 2002 Van Hoof was not giving a cabinet post in the new cabinet and the Cabinet Kok II was replaced by the Cabinet Balkenende I on 22 July 2002. In Augustus 2002 Van Hoof announced that he wouldn't not stand for the election of 2003 and continued to serve until the end of the parliamentary term on 30 January 2003. In August 2003 Van Hoof was appointed as acting Mayor of Delfzijl after acting Mayor Annemarie Jorritsma was nominated as Mayor of Almere, serving from 16 August 2003 until 1 May 2004. Van Hoof was appointment as State Secretary for Social Affairs and Employment in the Cabinet Balkenende II after Mark Rutte was appointment as State Secretary for Education, Culture and Science, taking office on 17 June 2004. The Cabinet Balkenende II fell on 30 June 2006 and continued to serve in a demissionary capacity until it was replaced by the caretaker Cabinet Balkenende III with Van Hoof continuing as State Secretary for Social Affairs and Employment, taking office on 7 July 2006. In August 2006 Van Hoof announced his retirement from national politics and that he wouldn't not stand for the election of 2006. The Cabinet Balkenende III was replaced by the Cabinet Balkenende IV on 22 February 2007.

Van Hoof retired from active politic and became active in the private sector and public sector and occupies numerous seats as a corporate director and nonprofit director on several boards of directors and supervisory boards (Limburg Secondary Education association, Stichting Pensioenfonds Zorg en Welzijn) and as a trade association executive for the Industry and Employers confederation (VNO-NCW).

== Decorations ==
Military decorations
Ribbon bar	Decoration	Country	Date	Comment
	Officers' Cross	Netherlands	15 April 1980	
	Distinction sign for Long-term, Honest and Loyal Service	Netherlands	30 November 1997	Honorable discharge
Honours
Ribbon bar	Honour	Country	Date	Comment
	Officer of the Order of Orange-Nassau	Netherlands	11 April 2007	Elevated from Knight (10 December 2002)

Political offices
Preceded by Jan Gmelich Meijling	State Secretary for Defence; 1998–2002	Succeeded by Cees van der Knaap
Preceded by Annemarie Jorritsma; Ad interim	Mayor of Delfzijl; Ad interim 2003–2004	Succeeded by Maritje Appel
Preceded by Mark Rutte	State Secretary for Social; Affairs and Employment; 2004–2007	Succeeded by Ahmed Aboutaleb
Business positions
Unknown	Chairman of the Supervisory board of the Limburg Secondary; Education association 2004–2017	Succeeded by André Postema
