= Jan Gmelich Meijling =

Dutch politician (1936–2012)

His Excellency Jan Gmelich Meijling
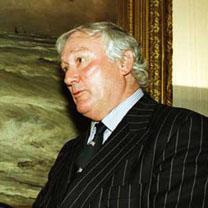
- Jan Gmelich Meijling in 1997

State Secretary for Defence
- In office 22 August 1994 – 3 August 1998
- Prime Minister: Wim Kok
- Preceded by: Ton Frinking
- Succeeded by: Henk van Hoof

Mayor of Den Helder
- In office 1 June 1985 – 22 August 1994
- Preceded by: Hans de Haan
- Succeeded by: Willem Hoekzema

Mayor of Castricum
- In office 16 April 1978 – 1 June 1985
- Preceded by: Wouter van Boxtel
- Succeeded by: Koos Schouwenaar

Personal details
- Born: Jan Christoffel Gmelich Meijling; 4 February 1936 Heemstede, Netherlands
- Died: 2 June 2012 (aged 76) Wassenaar, Netherlands
- Party: People's Party for Freedom and Democracy (from 1968)
- Spouse: Anneke Siemens (m. 1966)
- Children: 3 children
- Education: Royal Naval College; Leiden University (Bachelor of Education, Master of Education)
- Occupation: Politician · Civil servant · Naval officer · Nonprofit director · Lobbyist

Military service
- Allegiance: Netherlands
- Branch/service: Royal Netherlands Navy
- Years of service: 1960–1978 (Active duty); 1978–1986 (Reserve)
- Rank: Lieutenant commander
- Commands: HNLMS Bussemaker (1965–1966); HNLMS Hoogezand (1966–1970)
- Battles/wars: Cold War

Jan Christoffel Gmelich Meijling (4 February 1936 – 2 June 2012) was a Dutch politician of the People's Party for Freedom and Democracy (VVD) and naval officer. He served as Mayor of Castricum from April 16, 1978 until June 1, 1985 when he became Mayor of Den Helder serving until August 22, 1994 when he became State Secretary for Defence in the Cabinet Kok I from August 22, 1994 until August 3, 1998.

== Decorations ==
Honours
| Ribbon bar | Honour | Country | Date | Comment |
| | Knight of the Order of Orange-Nassau | Netherlands | 30 October 1998 | |

Political offices
| Preceded by Wouter van Boxtel | Mayor of Castricum; 1978–1985 | Succeeded by Koos Schouwenaar |
| Preceded by Hans de Haan | Mayor of Den Helder; 1985–1994 | Succeeded by Willem Hoekzema |
| Preceded by Ton Frinking | State Secretary for Defence; 1994–1998 | Succeeded by Henk van Hoof |
