= Edgar Michiels van Verduynen =

Dutch politician

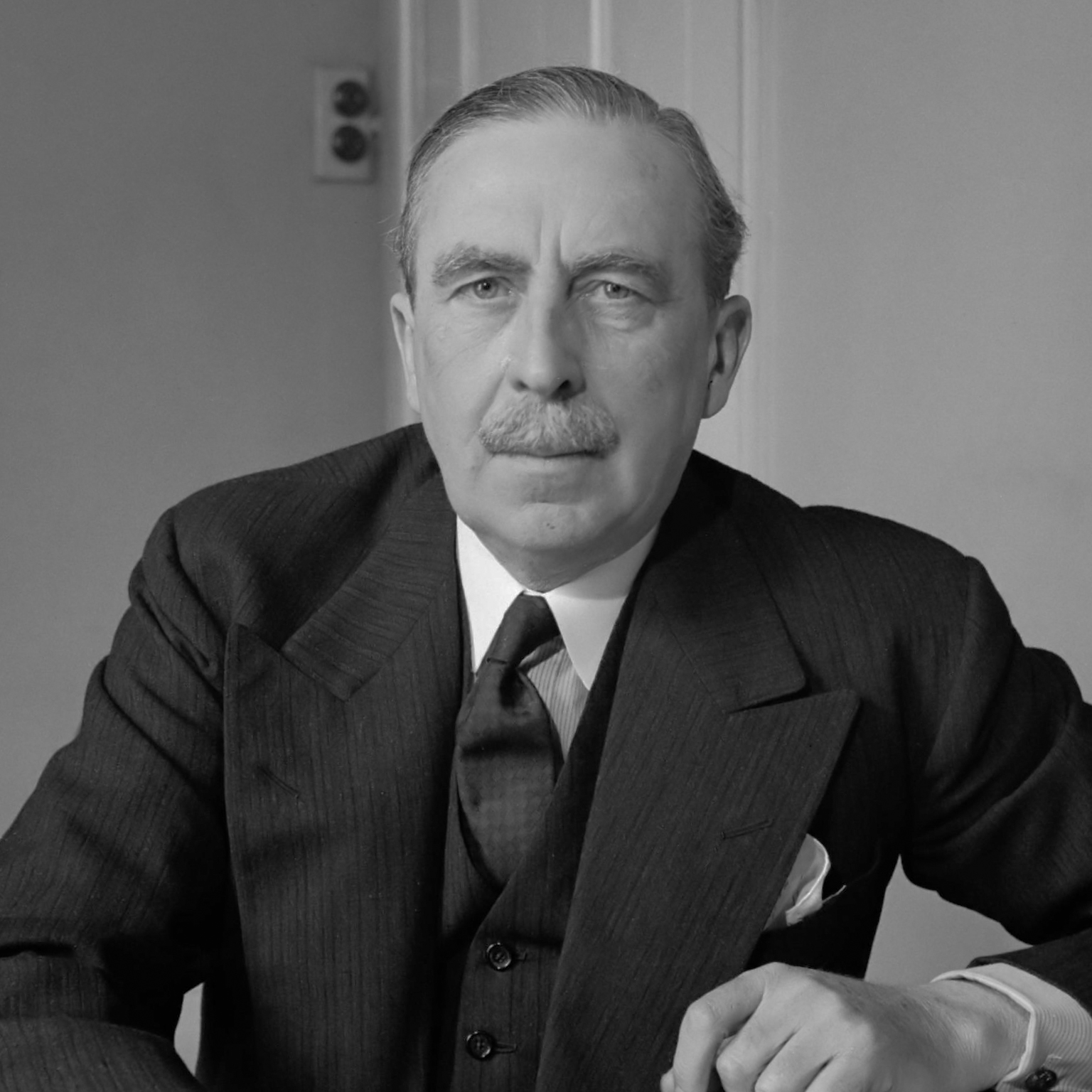
Michiels van Verduyn in 1942.

Edgar Frederick Marie Justin, Baron Michiels van Verduynen (2 December 1885 – 13 May 1952) was a Dutch politician.

Michiels van Verduynen was born in The Hague. He was a wealthy businessman, distinguished diplomat and conservative Catholic. He was a special envoy of the Dutch government to Czechoslovakia between 1920 and 1923. He became ambassador in London in 1939, shortly after the outbreak of the Second World War. When the Dutch government went into exile in London, he joined as a minister without portfolio.

He married in The Hague on 24 November 1917 with Henriette Elisabeth Jochems (1882–1968). The marriage was childless and he died in London in 1952.

== Decorations ==
- Knight in the Order of the Netherlands Lion, 1922
- Commander in the Order of the Netherlands Lion, 1946
- Knight Grand Cross in the Order of the Netherlands Lion, 1949
- Grand Cross of the Order of the White Lion (Czechoslovakia), 1924

Dutch nobility
| Preceded by Ferdinand Michiels van Verduynen | Baron Michiels van Verduyn; 1952 | Extinct |
