= Jack de Vries (politician) =

Dutch politician

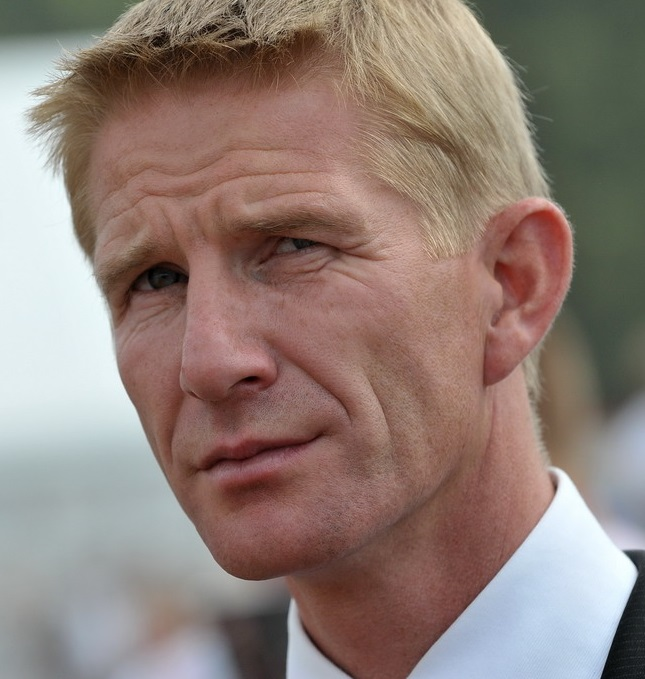
- Jack de Vries in 2009

State Secretary for Defence
- In office 18 December 2007 – 18 May 2010
- Prime Minister: Jan Peter Balkenende
- Preceded by: Cees van der Knaap
- Succeeded by: Barbara Visser (2017)

Personal details
- Born: Jacob Gabe de Vries; 25 July 1968 (age 58) Drachten, Netherlands
- Party: Christian Democratic Appeal
- Education: Royal Military Academy; Vrije Universiteit Amsterdam (Bachelor of Social Science, Master of Social Science)
- Occupation: Politician · Army Officer · Political consultant · Nonprofit director · Political pundit · Lobbyist

Military service
- Allegiance: Netherlands
- Branch/service: Royal Netherlands Army
- Years of service: 1993–1994 (Conscription); 1994–1996 (Active duty); 1996–1998 (Reserve)
- Rank: Lieutenant
- Unit: Regiment Huzaren Prins Alexander

Jacob Gabe "Jack" de Vries (born 25 July 1968) is a Dutch politician of the Christian Democratic Appeal (CDA) party and political consultant.

== Politics ==
De Vries studied at the VU University Amsterdam where he in 1992 obtained a MSc degree in political science. He was leader of the Christian Democratic youth movement (CDJA) and completed his military service with a stint as communications advisor to the Dutch Army. Never away from national politics, he became media spokesman of the CDA parliamentary faction in 1997, serving under Enneüs Heerma and Jaap de Hoop Scheffer. De Vries then became advisor to Jan Peter Balkenende who became political leader of the CDA in October 2001, after De Hoop Scheffer's lijsttrekker candidacy was not supported by the party. Balkenende won the 2002 elections, became Prime Minister, and brought de Vries with him to the Ministry of General Affairs.

In 2005, De Vries was appointed as CDA campaign chairman, and lead them through the 2006 municipal elections, the 2006 general election, and the 2007 provincial elections.

== Resignation ==
He resigned on 14 May 2010 after admitting to an extra-marital affair with his personal aide a few days earlier. He announced his retirement from politics the same day.

Political offices
Preceded by Cees van der Knaap	State Secretary for Defence; 2008–2010	Succeeded by Barbara Visser (2017)
