= Willem Hoekzema =

Dutch politician (born 1939)

His Excellency Willem Hoekzema
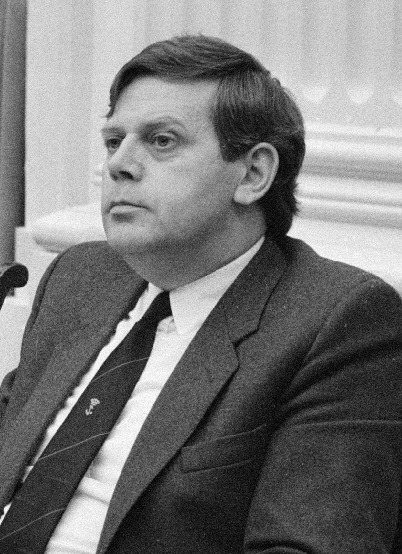
- Willem Hoekzema in 1985

Member of the Senate
- In office 10 June 2003 – 12 June 2007
- Parliamentary group: People's Party for Freedom and Democracy

Mayor of Den Helder
- In office 1 January 1995 – 1 January 2001
- Preceded by: Jan Gmelich Meijling
- Succeeded by: Jeroen Staatsen

Chairman of the People's Party for Freedom and Democracy
- In office 27 May 1994 – 28 May 1999
- Leader: Frits Bolkestein (1994–98); Hans Dijkstal (1998–99)
- Preceded by: Dian van Leeuwen-Schut
- Succeeded by: Bas Eenhoorn

Mayor of Huizen
- In office 1 May 1987 – 1 January 1995
- Preceded by: Freerk Fontein
- Succeeded by: Jos Verdier

State Secretary for Defence
- In office 19 November 1982 – 14 July 1986 Serving with Jan van Houwelingen
- Prime Minister: Ruud Lubbers
- Preceded by: Charl Schwietert
- Succeeded by: Jan van Houwelingen

Mayor of Coevorden
- In office 1 August 1975 – 8 February 1983
- Preceded by: Roelf Hofstee Holtrop
- Succeeded by: Bert Spahr van der Hoek

Personal details
- Born: Willem Klaas Hoekzema; 21 July 1939 (age 87) Bedum, Netherlands
- Party: People's Party for Freedom and Democracy
- Education: University of Groningen (Bachelor of Economics, Master of Economics)
- Occupation: Politician · Economist · Nonprofit director · Teacher

Willem Klaas Hoekzema (born 21 July 1939) is a retired Dutch politician of the People's Party for Freedom and Democracy (VVD) and economist.

== Decorations ==
Honours
Ribbon bar	Honour	Country	Date	Comment
	Knight of the Order of the Netherlands Lion	Netherlands	26 August 1986	

Party political offices
Preceded by Dian van Leeuwen-Schut	Chairman of the People's Party for Freedom and Democracy; 1994–1999	Succeeded by Bas Eenhoorn
Political offices
Preceded by Roelf Hofstee Holtrop	Mayor of Coevorden; 1975–1983	Succeeded by Bert Spahr van der Hoek
Preceded by Charl Schwietert	State Secretary for Defence; 1982–1986; Served alongside: Jan van Houwelingen	Succeeded by Jan van Houwelingen
Preceded by Freerk Fontein	Mayor of Huizen; 1987–1995	Succeeded by Jos Verdier
Preceded by Jan Gmelich Meijling	Mayor of Den Helder; 1995–2001	Succeeded by Jeroen Staatsen
