= Charl Schwietert =

Dutch journalist, writer, and politician

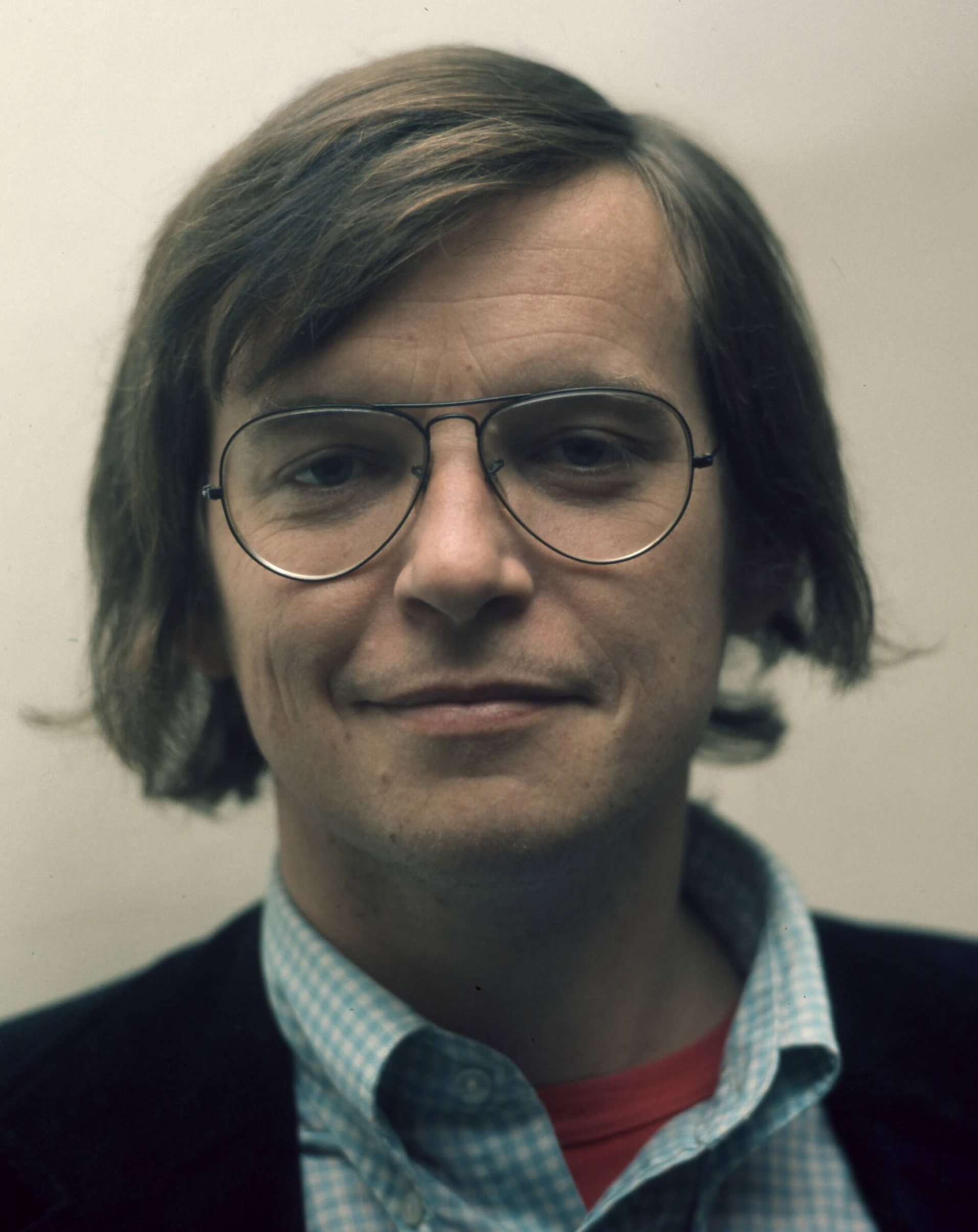
- Schwietert in 1980

State Secretary for Defence
- In office 8 November 1982 – 11 November 1982
- Prime Minister: Ruud Lubbers
- Minister: Job de Ruiter
- Preceded by: Jan van Houwelingen
- Succeeded by: Willem Hoekzema

Personal details
- Born: Charles Schwietert; 1 January 1943 Amsterdam, Netherlands
- Party: People's Party for Freedom and Democracy
- Occupation: Journalist, writer, communication adviser

Charles "Charl" Schwietert (born 1 January 1943) is a former Dutch journalist, writer, and communication adviser. In 1982 he was State Secretary for Defence for the People's Party for Freedom and Democracy (VVD). He was forced to resign after only three days due to inconsistencies in his curriculum vitae.

Political offices
Preceded by Jan van Houwelingen	State Secretary for Defence; 1982	Succeeded by Willem Hoekzema
