= Smith & Wesson M&P15-22 =

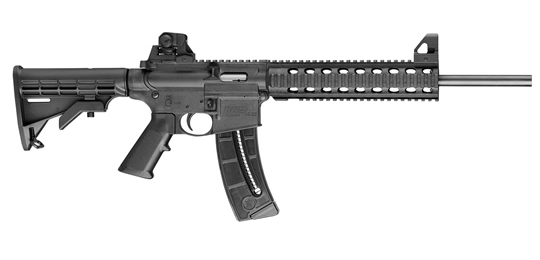
- Smith & Wesson M&P15-22
- Type: Semi-automatic rifle
- Place of origin: United States

Production history
- Manufacturer: Smith & Wesson
- Produced: 2009–present

Specifications
- Mass: 5.5 lbs / 2.5 kg
- Length: 33.75" Extended, 30.5" Collapsed
- Barrel length: 16.5 in (419 mm)
- Cartridge: .22 Long Rifle
- Action: Blowback
- Feed system: 10 or 25-round detachable box magazine
- Sights: Picatinny rail-mounted iron sights

The Smith & Wesson M&P15-22 is a .22 long rifle variant of the Smith & Wesson M&P15 semi-automatic rifle, but is blowback-operated rather than direct impingement-operated. It is intended for recreational shooting ("plinking") and small game hunting. It is made with a polymer upper and lower receiver rather than the aluminum alloy that is normally used in AR-15 style rifles, and uses proprietary polymer box magazines.

== Design ==
The M&P15-22 was designed to be a less expensive alternative for training with an AR-15 style rifle, as the rifle itself is much less expensive than most AR-15s, and the .22 LR ammunition is often much less expensive than the .223 Remington/5.56×45mm NATO. The rifle features a safety and bolt lock that operate just like an AR-15's.

The M&P15-22's lower recoil is used as a way to ease new shooters into the sport, allowing them to familiarize themselves with AR-15 controls without the fear of excessive recoil or noise. The disassembly process is very similar to the AR-15 and S&W M&P 15. The lower receiver detaches from the upper with two captured pins. The lower receiver contains a standard M&P15 trigger assembly that is compatible with most AR-15 trigger groups. The upper receiver contains the bolt, barrel, and charging handle. However, the upper and lower receivers of the M&P 15-22 are both deliberately incompatible with standard AR15/M4 uppers and lowers.

== Variants ==
The M&P15-22 Sport II can be had with MOE (Magpul Original Equipment) furnitures, MBUS sights and a threaded barrel.

Smith & Wesson offers the M&P 15/22 in a variety of finishes including Kryptek Highlander and Muddy Girl in addition to basic black or tan.

The M&P15-22P pistol was introduced in 2010, but was discontinued in 2013. Smith & Wesson reintroduced the M&P15-22P pistol in December 2020 with an SB Tactical SBA3 pistol brace.

== Safety issue ==
In 2016, Project Appleseed temporarily banned use of M&P15-22 rifles at their shooting clinics following a series of out-of-battery discharges, pending a full investigation and correction from Smith & Wesson. This was based on several incidents that occurred in multiple states, including one that injured a shooter on the line and another where multiple cartridges fired with but one trigger pull.
