= Apotheker =

Apotheker is a surname. Notable people with the name include:

- David Apotheker (1855–1911), Lithuanian-born writer
- Haijo Apotheker (born 1950), Dutch politician
- Léo Apotheker (born 1953), German business executive

== See also ==
- Aptheker
