= Consultative Group on Indonesia =

Former consortium of donors to the Indonesian government

The Consultative Group on Indonesia (CGI) gathered Indonesia's international donors from 1992 to 2007 to coordinate the flow of foreign aid to Indonesia. It was set up by the Indonesian government and the World Bank.

== History ==
The CGI was established as a replacement for the Inter-Governmental Group on Indonesia (IGGI). The IGGI was an international donor group established in the late 1960s to help coordinate the flow of foreign aid to Indonesia. IGGI was convened and chaired by the Dutch Government for over two decades throughout the 1970s and 1980. However, following increasing critical comments of Indonesian domestic policy by the then-Minister for Development Cooperation in the Netherlands, Jan Pronk, in early 1992, the Indonesian Government indicated that it no longer wished to participate in the annual IGGI meetings in The Hague and preferred that a new donor consultative group, the CGI, be established and be chaired by the World Bank.

During the 1990s and until 2007, the Indonesia and the World Bank arranged regular meetings of official donors to Indonesia to discuss policies and the annual levels of foreign aid. After the 1997-98 Asian financial crisis, for example, in 1998 the World Bank urged donors to provide appropriate amounts of financial support to promote economic recovery in Indonesia. The CGI meetings were key international meetings for Indonesia and were usually attended by a wide range of senior representatives, both from within Indonesia and from overseas.

== First meeting ==
The first meeting of the CGI was held in Paris on 16–17 July 1992. Mr Gautum Kaji (Regional Vice President, East Asia and Pacific Regional Office, World Bank) chaired the meeting. Mr Radius Prawiro (Coordinating Minister for the Economy, Finance, Industry and Development Supervision) led the Indonesian delegation. A range of bilateral donor country delegations attended, as did representatives from a number of multilateral organisations. The meeting began with the chair and the Head of the Indonesian delegation expressing appreciation to the Netherlands for convening the meetings of the IGGI over the previous 24 years. Delegations then discussed recent economic and social developments in Indonesia, reviewed external assistance requirements for the fiscal year 1991/92, and discussed the special topic of the meeting ("Physical Infrastructure and Human Resource Development").

== Later meetings ==
Later meetings of the CGI were held throughout the 1990s and into the 2000s.

2000 meeting

The 10th meeting of the CGI was held in Tokyo on 17–18 October 2000. Chair of the meeting, World Bank Vice President Jemal-ud-din Kassum noted that three issues had been of paramount interest at the meeting: the continuation of structural reforms, the clear articulation of a poverty reduction strategy, and the implementation of a governance program that covered legal and judicial reforms, decentralization, and forest management.

2003 meeting

The 12th meeting of the CGI was held in Bali on 22–23 January 2003. The meeting had been postponed following the Bali bombing attack in October 2002 and was held in Bali as a sign of support for Indonesia following the tragedy. The meeting included special sessions on the response to the Bali tragedy and, also, a cease-fire which had been announced in Aceh.

2005 meeting

Following the Boxing Day, 2004, tsunami in Asia which led to an estimated deathtoll of nearly 170,000 in the province of Aceh, the 14th CGI meeting was held on 19–20 January 2005. The meeting considered a special technical report prepared by the Indonesian Planning Agency, Bappenas, and the international donor community providing a preliminary assessment of the impact of the tsunami in Indonesia

2006 meeting

The 15th meeting of the CGI was held in Jakarta on 14 June 2006. This was the last CGI meeting before the Indonesian government announced in early 2007 that further meetings of the group would no longer be needed.

== Dissolution of the CGI ==
In early 2007, the president of Indonesia Susilo Bambang Yudhoyono announced that Indonesia no longer needed to meet donors in an annual conference such as the CGI and would prefer to take direct responsibility for coordinating Indonesian international development programs with donors.

== Funding through CGI ==
Estimates of the flow of finance through CGI arrangements reported by different source vary somewhat depending on the basis of reporting (commitments or disbursements, net or gross flows, loans or grants, etc.) In broad terms, the following tables, drawn from different sources, indicate the scale of pledges (that is, commitment basis) of finance made at CGI meetings.

Estimates of finance provided through CGI arrangements 1992–2000
Year	Total US$ mill	Contributors providing 2% or more of total
1992	4.9	Japan, Germany, France. World Bank, ADB
1993	5.1	Japan, Germany, France. World Bank, ADB
1994	5.2	UK, Japan, Germany, France. World Bank, ADB
1995	5.4	UK, Japan, Germany, France. World Bank, ADB
1996	5.3	Japan, Germany, World Bank, ADB
1997	5.3	Japan, World Bank, ADB
1998	7.9	US, Japan, Germany, World Bank, ADB, IsDB
1999	5.9	US, Japan, World Bank, ADB,
2000	4.7	US, Japan, Germany, World Bank, ADB, UNDP

Source: Bappenas (National Development Agency), Keberadaan Dan Peran Consultative Group for Indonesia (CG) Kajian dan Rekomendasi Kebijakaan [The Place and Role of the Consultative Group for Indonesia (CGI): Study and Policy Recommendations], Jakarta, 2003.

Estimates of finance provided through CGI arrangements 1997–2006
Year	Bilateral US$ mill	Multilateral US$ mill	Total US$ mill
1997/1998	3.5	3.0	6.5
1998/1999	2.3	5.6	7.9
1999/2000	1.6	4.2	5.9
2000	2.0	2.7	4.7
2001	2.3	3.0	5.4
2002	1.0	2.1	3.1
2003	1.0	1.8	2.7
2004	0.9	2.0	2.8
2005	1.5	2.0	3.5
2006	n.a	n.a.	3.9

Source: "Presiden bubarkan CGI (President abolishes CGI)", Bisnis Indonesia, 25 January 2007.
Note: Totals may not add due to rounding
