= List of King's and Queen's commissioners of Drenthe =

This article is a list of King's and Queen's commissioners of the province of Drenthe, Netherlands.

== List of King's and Queen's commissioners of Drenthe since 1945 ==
King's and Queen's commissioners of Drenthe		Term of office	Party
Harry Linthorst Homan	Dr. Baron; Reint de Vos van Steenwijk (1885–1964)	6 May 1945 – 15 July 1951 (6 years, 70 days)	Liberal State Party (1945–1946)
Harry Linthorst Homan	Dr. Baron; Reint de Vos van Steenwijk (1885–1964)	6 May 1945 – 15 July 1951 (6 years, 70 days)	Freedom Party (1946–1948)
Harry Linthorst Homan	Dr. Baron; Reint de Vos van Steenwijk (1885–1964)	6 May 1945 – 15 July 1951 (6 years, 70 days)	People's Party for Freedom and Democracy (1948–1970)
Jaap Cramer	Jaap Cramer (1899–1998)	15 July 1951 – 1 March 1964 (12 years, 230 days)	Labour Party
Dick Gaarlandt	Dick Gaarlandt (1909–1985)	1 March 1964 – 1 October 1974 (10 years, 214 days)	Labour Party
Gerard Londo	Gerard Londo (1913–2011)	1 October 1974 – 1 November 1974 (31 days)^{[Ad Interim]}	Labour Party
Tineke Schilthuis	Tineke Schilthuis (1921–2013)	1 November 1974 – 1 October 1982 (7 years, 334 days)	Labour Party
Ad Oele	Dr. Ad Oele (1923–2017)	1 October 1982 – 1 January 1989 (6 years, 92 days)	Labour Party
Wim Meijer	Wim Meijer (born 1939)	1 January 1989 – 1 January 1993 (4 years, 0 days)	Labour Party
Margreeth de Boer	Margreeth de Boer (born 1939)	1 January 1993 – 22 August 1994 (1 year, 233 days)^{[Appt]}	Labour Party
	Henk Weidgraaf (1931–2006)	22 August 1994 – 1 January 1995 (132 days)^{[Acting]}	Labour Party
Relus ter Beek	Relus ter Beek (1944–2008)	1 January 1995 – 29 September 2008 (13 years, 272 days)^{[Died]}	Labour Party
Rob Bats	Rob Bats (born 1962)	29 September 2008 – 1 May 2009 (214 days)^{[Acting]}	People's Party for Freedom and Democracy
	Jacques Tichelaar (1953)	1 May 2009 – 1 March 2017 (7 years, 304 days)^{[Res]}	Labour Party
	Henk Jumelet (1962)	1 March 2017 – 19 April 2017 (49 days)^{[Ad Interim]}	Christian; Democratic Appeal
Jozias van Aartsen	Jozias van Aartsen (born 1947)	19 April 2017 – 1 December 2017 (226 days)^{[Acting]}	People's Party for Freedom and Democracy
Jetta Klijnsma	Jetta Klijnsma (born 1957)	1 December 2017 – 1 January 2026 (8 years, 31 days)	Labour Party
	Agnes Mulder (1973)	1 January 2026 – Incumbent (139 days)	Christian; Democratic Appeal
