= Third Lubbers cabinet =

Cabinet of the Netherlands, 1989 to 1994

Third Lubbers cabinet Lubbers–Kok cabinet
- Cabinet of the Netherlands

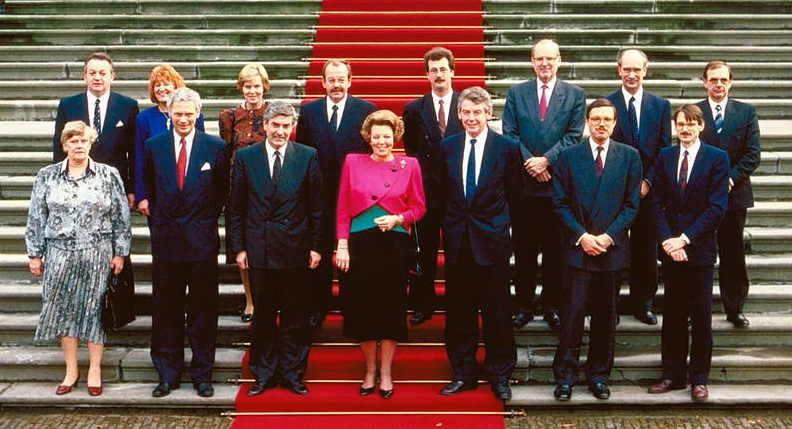
- The installation of the Third Lubbers cabinet on 7 November 1989
- Date formed: 7 November 1989
- Date dissolved: 22 August 1994; 4 years, 288 days in office (Demissionary from 10 May 1994)

People and organisations
- Monarch: Queen Beatrix
- Prime Minister: Ruud Lubbers
- Deputy Prime Minister: Wim Kok
- No. of ministers: 14
- Ministers removed: 7
- Total no. of members: 19
- Member party: Christian Democratic Appeal (CDA); Labour Party (PvdA)
- Status in legislature: Centrist majority grand coalition

History
- Incoming formation: 1989 formation
- Outgoing formation: 1994 formation
- Election: 1989 election
- Outgoing election: 1994 election
- Legislature terms: 1989–1994
- Predecessor: Second Lubbers cabinet
- Successor: First Kok cabinet

The Third Lubbers cabinet, also called the Lubbers–Kok cabinet, was the executive branch of the Dutch government from 7 November 1989 to 22 August 1994. The cabinet was formed the christian-democratic Christian Democratic Appeal (CDA) and the social-democratic Labour Party (PvdA) after the election of 1989. The cabinet was a centrist grand coalition and had a substantial majority in the House of Representatives with Christian-Democratic Leader Ruud Lubbers serving as Prime Minister. Labour Leader Wim Kok served as Deputy Prime Minister and Minister of Finance.

The cabinet served during the final years of the turbulent 1980s and the early years of the economic boom of the 1990s. Domestically it focused on revitalizing the economy, reducing the deficit, and stimulating further deregulation and privatization. It had to deal with the El Al Flight 1862 Crash. Internationally the signing of the Maastricht Treaty took place but also it had to deal with several crises such as the beginning of the Bosnian War. The cabinet suffered several major internal conflicts including multiple resignations, but completed its entire term and was succeeded by the First Kok cabinet following the 1994 election.

According to one study, “In a bid to placate the progressive wing of his party and to keep the Christian Democrats in the centre, Rudd Lubbers discarded the right-wing liberals (VVD) in 1989 as a coalition partner and invited the social democrats (PvdA) to partake in the third Lubbers cabinet (1989–1994).”

== Term ==
Composition of the cabinet in relation to the rest of the legislature

The cabinet was formed with a view to social reform. This was impossible because of the then bad shape of the Dutch economy, which made large reductions in government spending necessary. The reduction in spending on social care for disabled people led to demonstrations against the Dutch government in 1992. Many angry socialists left the Labour Party. The coalition lost heavily at the 1994 general election.

Several cabinet members returned after serving in previous cabinets: Minister of the Interior Ed van Thijn had served earlier in the same position from 1981 until 1982, Minister of Economic Affairs Koos Andriessen had served earlier in the same position from 1963 until 1965, Minister of Development Cooperation Jan Pronk had served earlier in the same position from 1973 until 1977 and State Secretary for Finance Marius van Amelsvoort had served earlier in the same position from 1980 until 1981.

=== Changes ===
On 18 September 1990 Minister of Agriculture, Nature and Fisheries Gerrit Braks (CDA) resigned after the Labour Party in the House of Representatives indicated that they had lost confidence in his ability to remain in office after strongly disagreeing in his animal welfare and fraud policy. Minister of Social Affairs and Employment Bert de Vries (CDA) served as acting Minister of Agriculture, Nature and Fisheries until 28 September 1990 when State Secretary for Economic Affairs Piet Bukman (CDA) was appointed as Minister of Agriculture, Nature and Fisheries. That same day Member of the House of Representatives Yvonne van Rooy (CDA), the former State Secretary for Economic Affairs was installed as his successor as State Secretary for Economic Affairs. That same day the function of State Secretary of Agriculture, Nature and Fisheries was re-implemented, Mayor of Haaksbergen Dzsingisz Gabor (CDA) was sworn in and assigned the portfolios of environmental policy, nature policy and agricultural management.

On 3 January 1993 Minister for Foreign Affairs Hans van den Broek (CDA) resigned after he was appointed as European Commissioner for External Relations and Enlargement. That same day Pieter Kooijmans (CDA), a former State Secretary for Foreign Affairs who until then had been working as a professor of International law at Leiden University, was appointed as his successor.

On 1 June 1993 State Secretary for Defence Berend-Jan van Voorst tot Voorst (CDA) resigned after he was appointed as Queen's Commissioner of Limburg. That same day Member of the House of Representatives Ton Frinking (CDA) succeed him.

On 5 June 1993 State Secretary for Social Affairs and Employment Elske ter Veld (PvdA) resigned after gaining insufficient support from her own Labour Party in the House of Representatives for a new widow's pension act. On 9 June 1993 State Secretary for Education and Sciences Jacques Wallage (PvdA) was appointed as her successor. That same day Roel in 't Veld (PvdA), who until then had been working as a professor of Public administration at the Erasmus University Rotterdam was installed as his successor as State Secretary for Education and Sciences. On 19 June 1993 just 10 days after taking office Roel in 't Veld resigned after he was discredited due to additional positions he held when he was a professor. On 2 July 1993 Job Cohen (PvdA), who until then had been working as rector magnificus of the State University of Limburg and as a professor of Jurisprudence, was appointed as his successor.

On 10 January 1994 Minister of the Interior Ien Dales (PvdA) unexpectedly died from a heart attack at the age of 62. Minister of Justice Ernst Hirsch Ballin (CDA) served as acting Minister of the Interior until 18 January 1994 when Mayor of Amsterdam Ed van Thijn (PvdA) was installed as Dales' successor.

On 26 February 1994 State Secretary for Welfare, Health and Culture Hans Simons (PvdA) resigned after he was appointed as a alderman in Rotterdam, but because the cabinet was already nearing the end of its term, he was not replaced.

On 27 May 1994 Minister of the Interior Ed van Thijn (PvdA) and Minister of Justice Ernst Hirsch Ballin (CDA) resigned over illegal interrogation techniques used by the police. They were succeeded by their State Secretaries, Dieuwke de Graaff-Nauta (CDA) became Minister of the Interior and Aad Kosto (PvdA) became Minister of Justice.

Due to the installment of a new European Parliament, several members resigned their functions to become members of this new parliament on 16 July 1994 and because the cabinet was already demissionary their portfolios were assigned to other ministers. The portfolio of Minister of Transport and Water Management was added to Minister of Economic Affairs Koos Andriessen (CDA), The portfolio of Minister of Welfare, Health and Culture was added to Minister of Education and Sciences Jo Ritzen (PvdA).

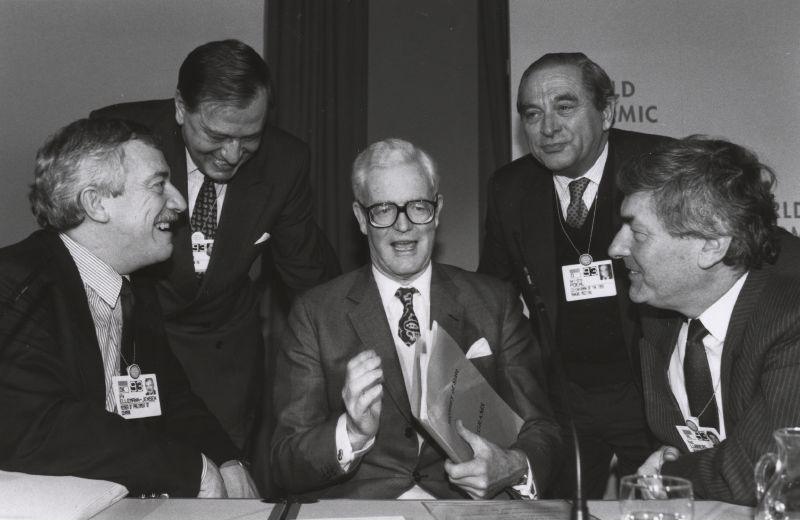
Danish Minister of Foreign Affairs Uffe Ellemann-Jensen, President of the Deutsche Bundesbank Karl Otto Pöhl, and Prime Minister Ruud Lubbers at a World Economic Forum conference in Davos on 1 January 1993

== Cabinet members ==
Ministers		Title/Ministry/Portfolio(s)			Term of office	Party
Ruud Lubbers	Ruud Lubbers (1939–2018)	Prime Minister	General Affairs		4 November 1982 – 22 Augustus 1994^{[Retained]}	Christian; Democratic Appeal
Ruud Lubbers	Ruud Lubbers (1939–2018)	Minister	Interior	• Netherlands; Antilles and Aruba Affairs	7 November 1989 – 14 November 1989^{[Ad Interim]}	Christian; Democratic Appeal
Ruud Lubbers	Ruud Lubbers (1939–2018)	Minister	Interior	• Netherlands; Antilles and Aruba Affairs	27 May 1994 – 22 August 1994^{[Acting]}	Christian; Democratic Appeal
Wim Kok	Wim Kok (1938–2018)	Deputy; Prime Minister	Finance		7 November 1989 – 22 Augustus 1994	Labour Party
Wim Kok	Wim Kok (1938–2018)	Minister	Finance		7 November 1989 – 22 Augustus 1994	Labour Party
Ien Dales	Ien Dales (1931–1994)	Minister	Interior		7 November 1989 – 10 January 1994^{[Died]}	Labour Party
Ernst Hirsch Ballin	Ernst Hirsch Ballin (born 1950)	Minister	Interior		10 January 1994 – 18 January 1994^{[Ad Interim]}	Christian; Democratic Appeal
Ed van Thijn	Ed van Thijn (1934–2021)	Minister	Interior		18 January 1994 – 27 May 1994^{[Res]}	Labour Party
Dieuwke de Graaff-Nauta	Dieuwke de Graaff-Nauta (1930–2008)	Minister	Interior		27 May 1994 – 22 Augustus 1994	Christian; Democratic Appeal
Hans van den Broek	Hans van den Broek (1936–2025)	Minister	Foreign Affairs		4 November 1982 – 3 January 1993^{[Retained]} ^{[App]}	Christian; Democratic Appeal
Pieter Kooijmans	Pieter Kooijmans (1933–2013)	Minister	Foreign Affairs		3 January 1993 – 22 Augustus 1994	Christian; Democratic Appeal
Ernst Hirsch Ballin	Ernst Hirsch Ballin (born 1950)	Minister	Justice		7 November 1989 – 27 May 1994^{[Res]}	Christian; Democratic Appeal
Aad Kosto	Aad Kosto (born 1938)	Minister	Justice		27 May 1994 – 22 August 1994	Labour Party
Koos Andriessen	Koos Andriessen (1928–2019)	Minister	Economic Affairs		7 November 1989 – 22 Augustus 1994	Christian; Democratic Appeal
Relus ter Beek	Relus ter Beek (1944–2008)	Minister	Defence		7 November 1989 – 6 February 1991^{[Note]}	Labour Party
Jan Pronk	Jan Pronk (born 1940)	Minister	Defence		6 February 1991 – 3 March 1991^{[Acting]}	Labour Party
Relus ter Beek	Relus ter Beek (1944–2008)	Minister	Defence		3 March 1991 – 22 August 1994	Labour Party
Hedy d'Ancona	Hedy d'Ancona (born 1937)	Minister	Welfare, Health and Culture		7 November 1989 – 16 July 1994^{[Res]}	Labour Party
Jo Ritzen	Jo Ritzen (born 1945)	Minister	Welfare, Health and Culture		16 July 1994 – 22 August 1994^{[Acting]}	Labour Party
Jo Ritzen	Jo Ritzen (born 1945)	Minister	Education and Sciences		7 November 1989 – 3 August 1998^{[Continued]}	Labour Party
Bert de Vries	Bert de Vries (born 1938)	Minister	Social Affairs and Employment		7 November 1989 – 22 Augustus 1994	Christian; Democratic Appeal
Hanja Maij-Weggen	Hanja; Maij-Weggen (born 1943)	Minister	Transport and Water Management		7 November 1989 – 16 July 1994^{[Res]}	Christian; Democratic Appeal
Koos Andriessen	Koos Andriessen (1928–2019)	Minister	Transport and Water Management		16 July 1994 – 22 August 1994^{[Acting]}	Christian; Democratic Appeal
Gerrit Braks	Gerrit Braks (1933–2017)	Minister	Agriculture, Nature and Fisheries		4 November 1982 – 18 September 1990^{[Retained]} ^{[Res]}	Christian; Democratic Appeal
Bert de Vries	Bert de Vries (born 1938)	Minister	Agriculture, Nature and Fisheries		18 September 1990 – 28 September 1990^{[Ad Interim]}	Christian; Democratic Appeal
Piet Bukman	Piet Bukman (1934–2022)	Minister	Agriculture, Nature and Fisheries		28 September 1990 – 22 August 1994	Christian; Democratic Appeal
Hans Alders	Hans Alders (born 1952)	Minister	Housing, Spatial; Planning and the Environment		7 November 1989 – 22 August 1994	Labour Party
Minister without portfolio		Title/Ministry/Portfolio(s)			Term of office	Party
Jan Pronk	Jan Pronk (born 1940)	Minister	Foreign Affairs	• Development; Cooperation	7 November 1989 – 3 August 1998^{[Continued]}	Labour Party
State Secretaries		Title/Ministry/Portfolio(s)			Term of office	Party
Dieuwke de Graaff-Nauta	Dieuwke de Graaff-Nauta (1930–2008)	State Secretary	Interior	• Municipalities • Emergency; Services • Emergency; Management • Regional; Languages	14 July 1986 – 27 May 1994^{[Retained]} ^{[App]}	Christian; Democratic Appeal
Piet Dankert	Piet Dankert (1934–2003)	State Secretary^{[Title]}	Foreign Affairs	• European Union • Benelux	7 November 1989 – 16 July 1994^{[Res]}	Labour Party
Marius van Amelsvoort	Marius van Amelsvoort (1930–2006)	State Secretary	Finance	• Fiscal Policy • Tax and Customs • Governmental; Budget	7 November 1989 – 22 August 1994	Christian; Democratic Appeal
Aad Kosto	Aad Kosto (born 1938)	State Secretary	Justice	• Immigration and Asylum • Civil Law • Judicial Reform • Youth Justice • Penitentiaries	7 November 1989 – 27 May 1994^{[App]}	Labour Party
Piet Bukman	Piet Bukman (1934–2022)	State Secretary^{[Title]}	Economic Affairs	• Trade and Export • Regional; Development • Consumer; Protection • Tourism	7 November 1989 – 28 September 1990^{[App]}	Christian; Democratic Appeal
Yvonne van Rooy	Yvonne van Rooy (born 1951)	State Secretary^{[Title]}	Economic Affairs	• Trade and Export • Regional; Development • Consumer; Protection • Tourism	28 September 1990 – 22 August 1994	Christian; Democratic Appeal
Berend-Jan van Voorst tot Voorst	Baron; Berend-Jan van Voorst tot Voorst (1944–2023)	State Secretary	Defence	• Human; Resources • Equipment • Justice	7 November 1989 – 1 June 1993^{[App]}	Christian; Democratic Appeal
Ton Frinking	Ton Frinking (1931–2022)	State Secretary	Defence	• Human; Resources • Equipment • Justice	1 June 1993 – 22 August 1994	Christian; Democratic Appeal
	Hans Simons (1947–2019)	State Secretary	Welfare, Health and Culture	• Primary; Healthcare • Elderly Care • Youth Care • Disability Policy	7 November 1989 – 26 February 1994^{[Res]}	Labour Party
Elske ter Veld	Elske ter Veld (1944–2017)	State Secretary	Social Affairs and Employment	• Social Services • Equality • Emancipation	7 November 1989 – 4 June 1993^{[Res]}	Labour Party
Jacques Wallage	Jacques Wallage (1946–2026)	State Secretary	Social Affairs and Employment	• Social Services • Equality • Emancipation	9 June 1993 – 22 August 1994	Labour Party
Jacques Wallage	Jacques Wallage (1946–2026)	State Secretary	Education and Sciences	• Primary; Education • Secondary; Education • Special; Education	7 November 1989 – 9 June 1993^{[App]}	Labour Party
Roel in 't Veld	Roel in 't Veld (born 1942)	State Secretary	Education and Sciences	• Secondary; Education • Higher; Education • Science Policy	9 June 1993 – 19 June 1993^{[Res]}	Labour Party
Job Cohen	Job Cohen (born 1947)	State Secretary	Education and Sciences	• Higher; Education • Science Policy	2 July 1993 – 22 August 1994	Labour Party
	Dzsingisz Gabor (born 1940)	State Secretary	Agriculture, Nature and Fisheries	• Food Policy • Environmental; Policy • Nature • Fisheries • Forestry • Animal Welfare • Recreation	28 September 1990 – 22 August 1994	Christian; Democratic Appeal
Enneüs Heerma	Enneüs Heerma (1944–1999)	State Secretary	Housing, Spatial; Planning and the Environment	• Urban Planning • Public Housing • Spatial Planning	27 October 1986 – 22 August 1994^{[Retained]}	Christian; Democratic Appeal

^{Resigned}
^{Retained from the previous cabinet}
^{Continued in the next cabinet}
^{Acting}
^{Ad Interim}
^{Died in Office}
^{Designated with the diplomatic rank of Minister}
^{Medical leave of absence from 6 February 1991 until 3 March 1991}
^{Resigned following election to the European Parliament}
^{Appointed as European Commissioner}
^{Appointed as Minister of the Interior}
^{Appointed as Minister of Justice}
^{Appointed as Minister of Agriculture, Nature and Fisheries}
^{Appointed as Queen's Commissioner of Limburg}
^{Appointed as State Secretary for Social Affairs and Employment}

== Trivia ==
- Seven cabinet members had previous experience as scholars and professors: Ernst Hirsch Ballin (Constitutional and Administrative Law), Pieter Kooijmans (International human rights Law), Koos Andriessen (Political Economics), Jo Ritzen (Public and Education Economics), Bert de Vries (Business Economics), Roel in 't Veld (Public Administration) and Job Cohen (Jurisprudence).
- Seven members (later) served as Mayors: Ien Dales (Nijmegen), Ed van Thijn, Enneüs Heerma and Job Cohen (Amsterdam), Gerrit Braks (Eindhoven), Jacques Wallage (Groningen) and Dzsingisz Gabor (Haaksbergen).
- Six cabinet members later served as in high-profile international functions: Ruud Lubbers (United Nations High Commissioner for Refugees), Hans van den Broek (European Commissioner), Pieter Kooijmans (Judge of the International Court of Justice), Jan Pronk (Special Representative of the United Nations), Piet Bukman (President of the European People's Party) and Piet Dankert (President of the European Parliament).
- Five cabinet members where of Jewish descent: Ernst Hirsch Ballin (German-Ashkenazi), Ed van Thijn (Dutch-Ashkenazi), Hedy d'Ancona (Italian-Sephardi), Jacques Wallage (English-Ashkenazi) and Job Cohen (German-Ashkenazi).
- Four cabinet members (later) served as Queen's Commissioners: Relus ter Beek (Drenthe), Hanja Maij-Weggen (Zeeland), Hans Alders (Groningen) and Berend-Jan van Voorst tot Voorst (Limburg).
- Four cabinet members would later be granted the honorary title of Minister of State: Ruud Lubbers (1995), Wim Kok (2002), Hans van den Broek (2005) and Pieter Kooijmans (2007).
- On appointment, Koos Andriessen had served as Minister of Economic Affairs 24 years and 207 days previously, in the Marijnen cabinet.
- Ruud Lubbers became the longest-serving Dutch Prime Minister with a total period in office of 11 years, 291 days.
