= List of mayors of Leeuwarden =

The following is a list of mayors of the municipality of Leeuwarden from 1821 until the present.

A mayor in the Netherlands is called a burgemeester (burgomaster). This is a list of mayors of the Dutch city and capital of Friesland, Leeuwarden.

== Mayors of Leeuwarden ==
Name	Title	From	To	Years	Party	Political stance	Notes
T. Feenstra	N/A	1821	1840	19	N/A	N/A	
J.H. van Boelens	mr.	1840	1851	11	N/A	Liberal	
J.H. Beucker Andreae	mr.	1851	1865	14	N/A	Liberal	
D. Zeper	N/A	1866	1871	5	N/A	Liberal	
J. Bieruma Oosting	mr.	1871	1877	6	N/A	Conservative	
W.J. van Welderen Baron Rengers	mr.	September 1877	1883	6	Liberale Unie	Liberal	
P. Lycklama à Nijeholt	N/A	November 1, 1883	December 1, 1891	8	N/A	Liberal	
J.S. van Harinxma thoe Slooten	Baron, mr.	1892	June 1, 1898	6	N/A	Liberal	
A. Röell	Baron, dr., mr.	September 1, 1898	September 1, 1904	6	N/A	Liberal	
A.E. Zimmerman	N/A	September 1, 1904	September 1, 1911	7	N/A	N/A	
J.A.N. Patijn	mr.	October 1, 1911	October 1, 1918	7	N/A	Liberal	
J.M. van Beyma	mr.	1918	1943	25	N/A	N/A	
W.J. Schönhard	mr.	1943	1945	2	NSB	Fascist	
J. Algera	mr.	1945	1946	2	ARP	Conservative	
A.A.M. van der Meulen	mr.	March 16, 1946	March 1, 1966	20	PvdA	Socialist	
W. Harmsma		1966	1966	1	PvdA	Socialist	
J.S. Brandsma		1967	1983	16	PvdA	Socialist	
J.G.J. te Loo	mr.	1983	1993	10	PvdA	Socialist	
Hayo Apotheker	mr.	November 1, 1993	August 3, 1998	5	D'66	Liberal	
Loekie van Maaren-van Balen	N/A	February 16, 1999	November 1, 2001	2	PvdA	Socialist	
Margreeth de Boer	N/A	November 1, 2001	April 1, 2004	3	PvdA	Socialist	
G. Dales	dr.	May 1, 2004	July 1, 2007	3	VVD	Liberal	
Ferd Crone	drs.	November 15, 2007	July 11, 2019	12	PvdA	Socialist	
Sybrand van Haersma Buma	LLM, LLM	August 26, 2019	July 1, 2026	7	CDA		
Foort van Oosten		July 1, 2026	Present		VVD	Liberal	Interim
