= Loekie van Maaren-van Balen =

Dutch politician

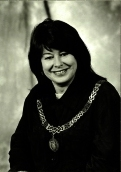
Maaren-van Baalen, Mayor of Weert in the period 1991-1999

Louise Bernardina Maria (Loekie) van Maaren-van Balen (born 9 March 1946 in Wormerveer) is a former Dutch politician. She became known nationwide during her term of office as the mayor of Leeuwarden.

== Biography ==
Van Maaren was born in Wormerveer, now part of the North Holland municipality of Zaanstad.

In the 70s she worked as a teacher of social science and community work at the Social Academy of The Hague. She did community work in Haarlem as an employee of "Provinciaal Opbouworgaan Haarlem". Because of her work she became interested in politics and decided to join the PvdA in 1975. Three year later she was sworn in as councillor for municipality of Haarlem. In 1983 she became an alderman in Haarlem. Eight years later, in 1991, she applied for the job of burgomaster of Weert, a municipality in the province of Limburg.

She is praised for her good presentation, compassion and firmness.

=== Mayor of Leeuwarden ===
The post of mayor of Leeuwarden became available after the departure of Haijo Apotheker, who became minister. Loekie received a call and expressed her interest. She felt she needed the challenge after being the mayor of Weert for eight years. The high unemployment rate, a dated housing file and internal difficulties after a huge reorganisation. Enough reason for her to apply for the job.

The confidence commission in Leeuwarden led by Peter den Oudsten, who is currently mayor of Enschede, decided unanimously she would make the finest mayor.

== Published work ==
- van Maaren-van Baalen, Loekie (2003). HOEZO BURGEMEESTER, de ervaringen van de burgemeester van Leeuwarden 1999-2001. 's-Gravenhage: Uitgeverij BzztôH BV. ISBN 90-453-0143-1.

Political offices
Preceded by Jo Matti	Mayor of Weert; 1991–1999	Succeeded by Karel Majoor
Preceded by Haijo Apotheker	Mayor of Leeuwarden; 1999–2001	Succeeded by Margreeth de Boer
