= 1989 Dutch cabinet formation =

Formation of the third Lubbers cabinet

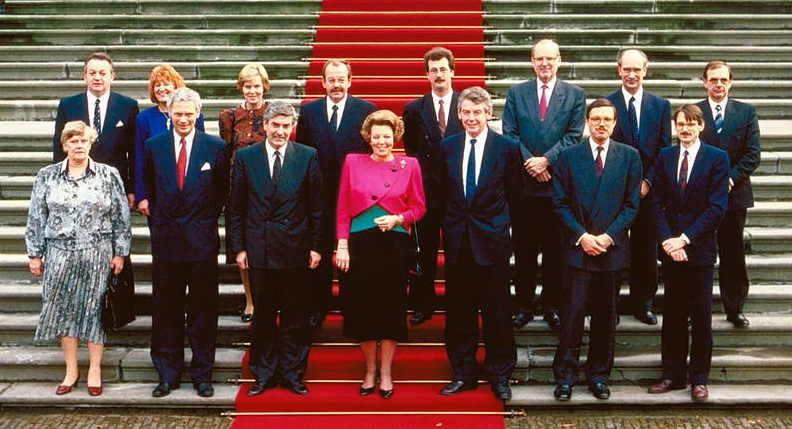
The bordesscène with Queen Beatrix in the center foreground and the ministers of the Lubbers III cabinet

The 1989 Dutch cabinet formation followed the general election of 6 September that year and resulted in the formation of the Lubbers III cabinet. The formation process lasted 62 days.

== Background ==
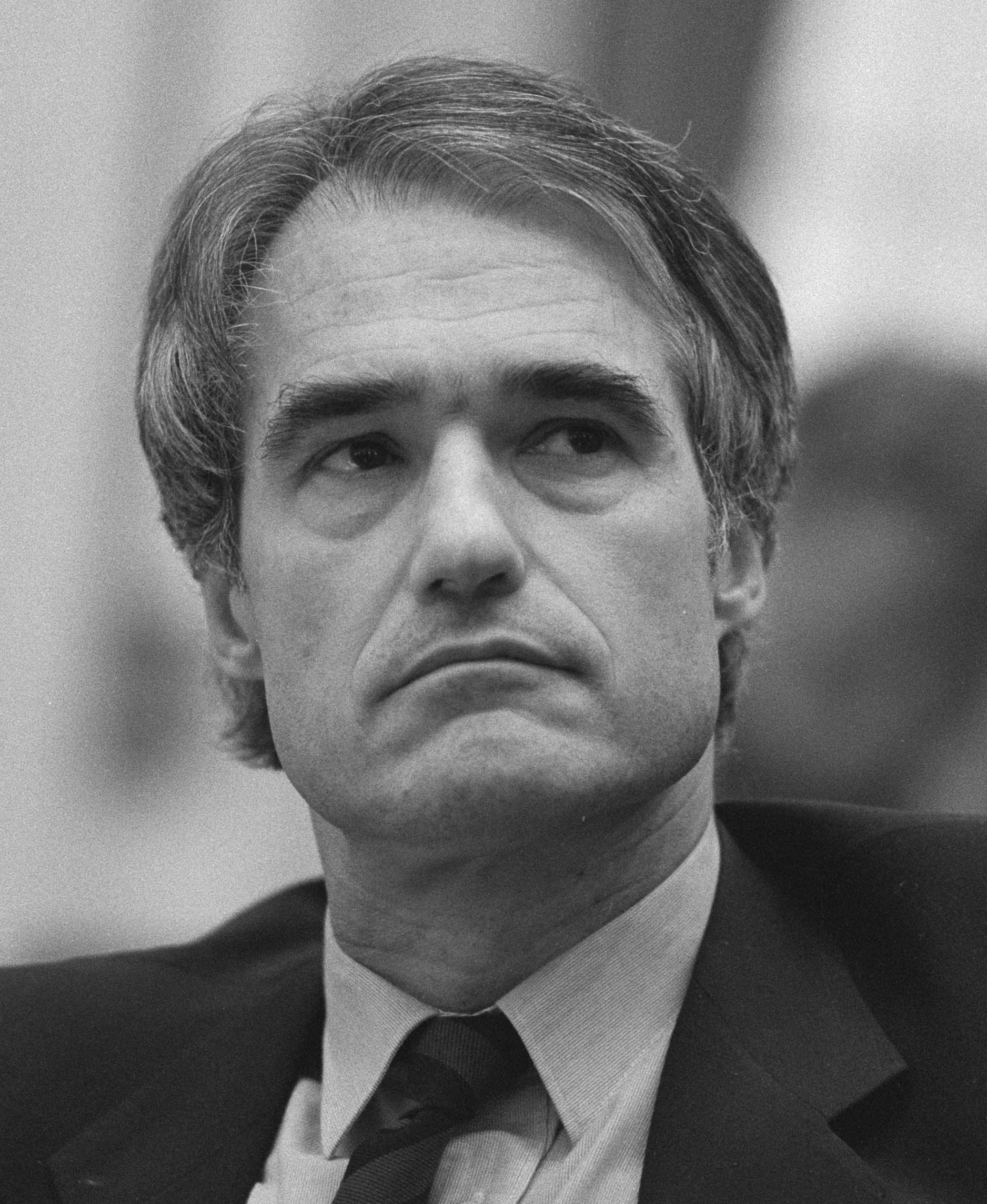
Rudolf de Korte

The Lubbers II cabinet fell on 3 May 1989 after a conflict over the so-called travel expenses tax allowance crisis. The collapse followed a period of growing tensions between coalition partners, the Christian Democratic Appeal (CDA) and the People's Party for Freedom and Democracy (VVD). Relations between the two parties had already shifted significantly after the 1986 Dutch general election. The CDA had gained seats, while the VVD lost nine, creating an imbalance of power within the cabinet. VVD members increasingly felt that the CDA behaved as if it was the dominant governing party.

There was also internal unrest within the VVD. After Ed Nijpels stepped down as party leader, Joris Voorhoeve became parliamentary leader. He shared a dual leadership arrangement with Deputy Prime Minister Rudolf de Korte. De Korte had already clashed publicly with Prime Minister Ruud Lubbers in 1986 over a proposed state visit by Queen Beatrix to Japan. During a parliamentary debate, Lubbers stated that De Korte’s remarks fell into the category of “once but never again.” Relations between De Korte and other VVD ministers were also frequently strained.

=== General election ===
The election was held amid considerable uncertainty about whether CDA–VVD cooperation would continue. The results made continuation even less likely. The CDA remained the largest party with 54 seats, the same as in 1986. The PvdA, led for the first time by Wim Kok, lost three seats and fell to 49. Gains were recorded by Democrats 66 (from 9 to 12 seats) and the Reformed Political League (GPV) (from 1 to 2 seats). The newly formed GreenLeft ended with 6 seats, below expectations. The VVD suffered significant losses, dropping from 27 to 22 seats.

== Informateur Jan de Koning ==
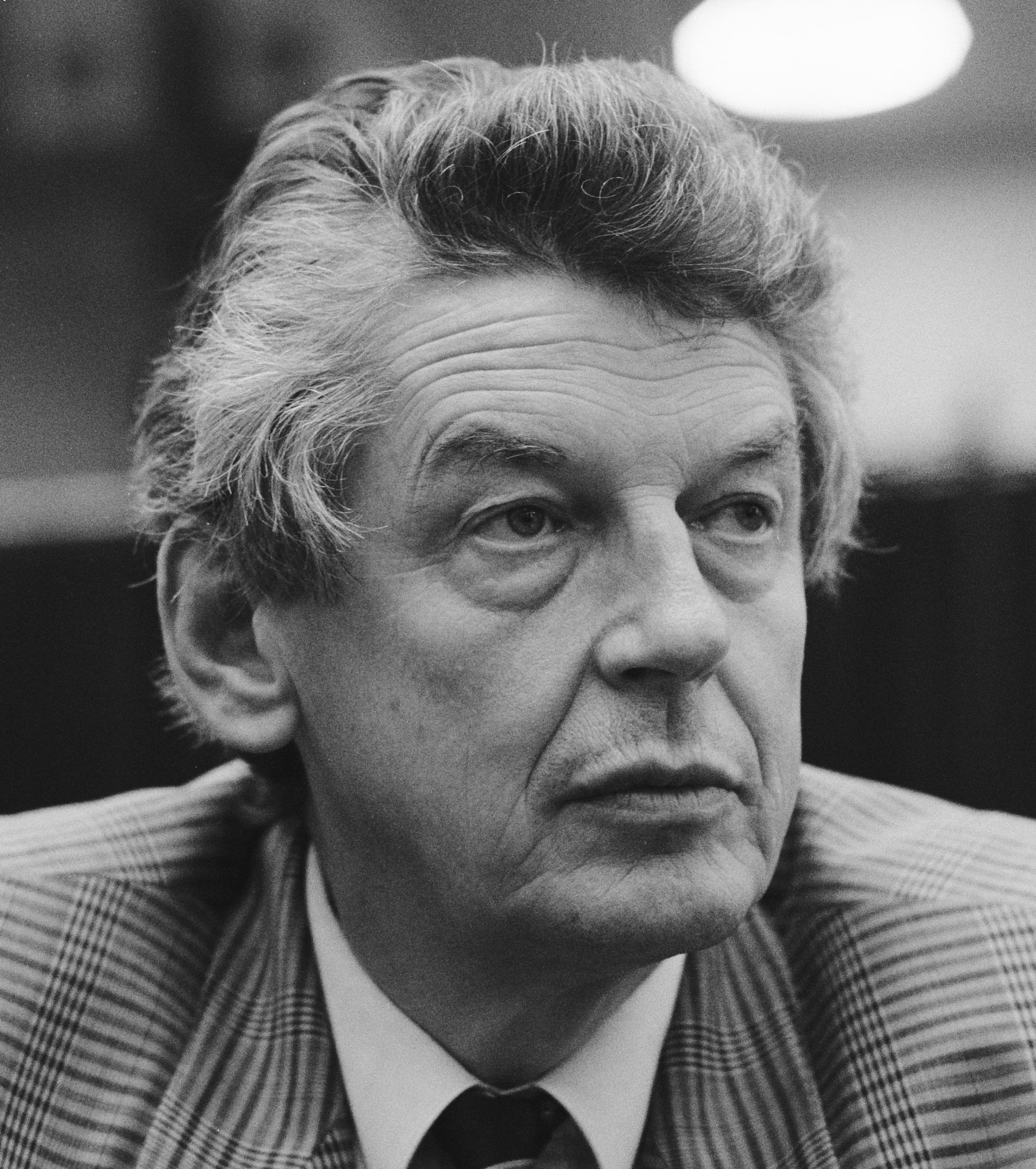
Wim Kok, PvdA negotiator and future Deputy Prime Minister in the Lubbers III cabinet

Queen Beatrix appointed CDA figure Jan de Koning as informateur. He was tasked with exploring the CDA’s preference to continue the previous coalition, possibly with support from D66. However, D66 had already stated before the election that it would only support a centre-left government. His efforts therefore failed. He subsequently advised the Queen to explore the possibility of a coalition between the CDA and PvdA, possibly with D66.

== Informateur Ruud Lubbers ==
Prime Minister Lubbers was then appointed as informateur. He was not in favour of including D66 in the cabinet (which was also not necessary numerically, as CDA and PvdA together held a large majority in parliament). D66 was therefore effectively excluded from the formation process.

Negotiations continued between the two remaining parties on a coalition agreement. On the CDA side, Bert de Vries acted as negotiator, while Wim Kok represented the PvdA. They were supported by Elco Brinkman and Thijs Wöltgens respectively. On 27 October, a draft coalition agreement was reached.

== Formateur Lubbers ==
Ruud Lubbers then spent another twelve days assembling the cabinet, after which the Lubbers/Kok cabinet took office on 7 November.
