= Inter-Governmental Group on Indonesia =

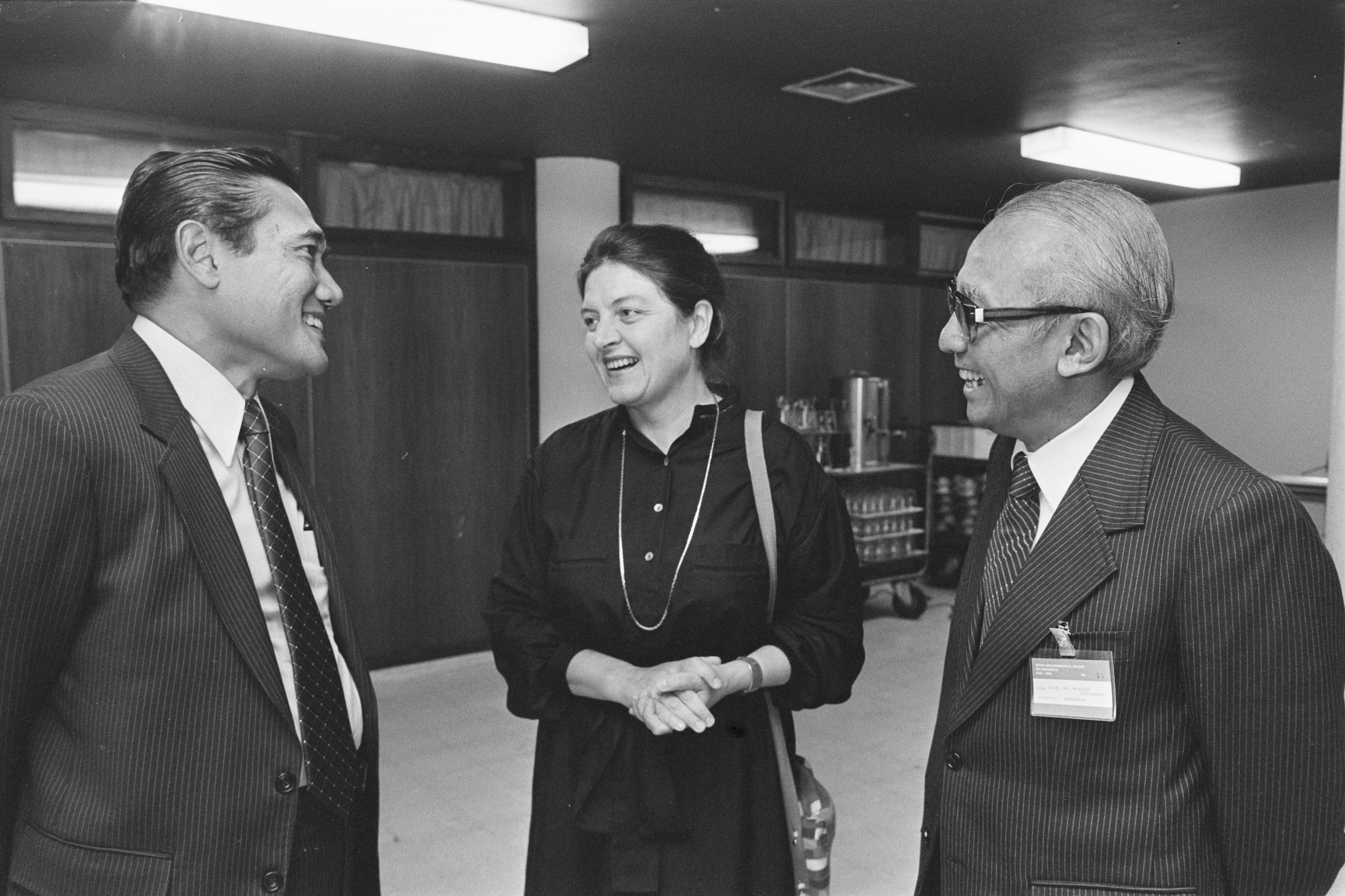
Ministers Ali Wardhana (Indonesia), Eegje Schoo (Netherlands), and Widjojo Nitisastro (Indonesia) at an IGGI meeting in The Hague in June 1983.

The Inter-Governmental Group on Indonesia (IGGI) was established in 1967 as an international consortium of official donors to coordinate the provision of foreign assistance to Indonesia. IGGI was the lead official grouping of donors to Indonesia from 1967 until early 1992 when it was abolished and replaced by the Consultative Group on Indonesia (CGI). For the 25 years up to 1992, IGGI was a key regional institution in Southeast Asia. It helped provide strong international support for Indonesia's economic recovery after the economic difficulties in Indonesia during the period of the Sukarno presidency in 1950s and 1960s.

== Establishment of IGGI ==
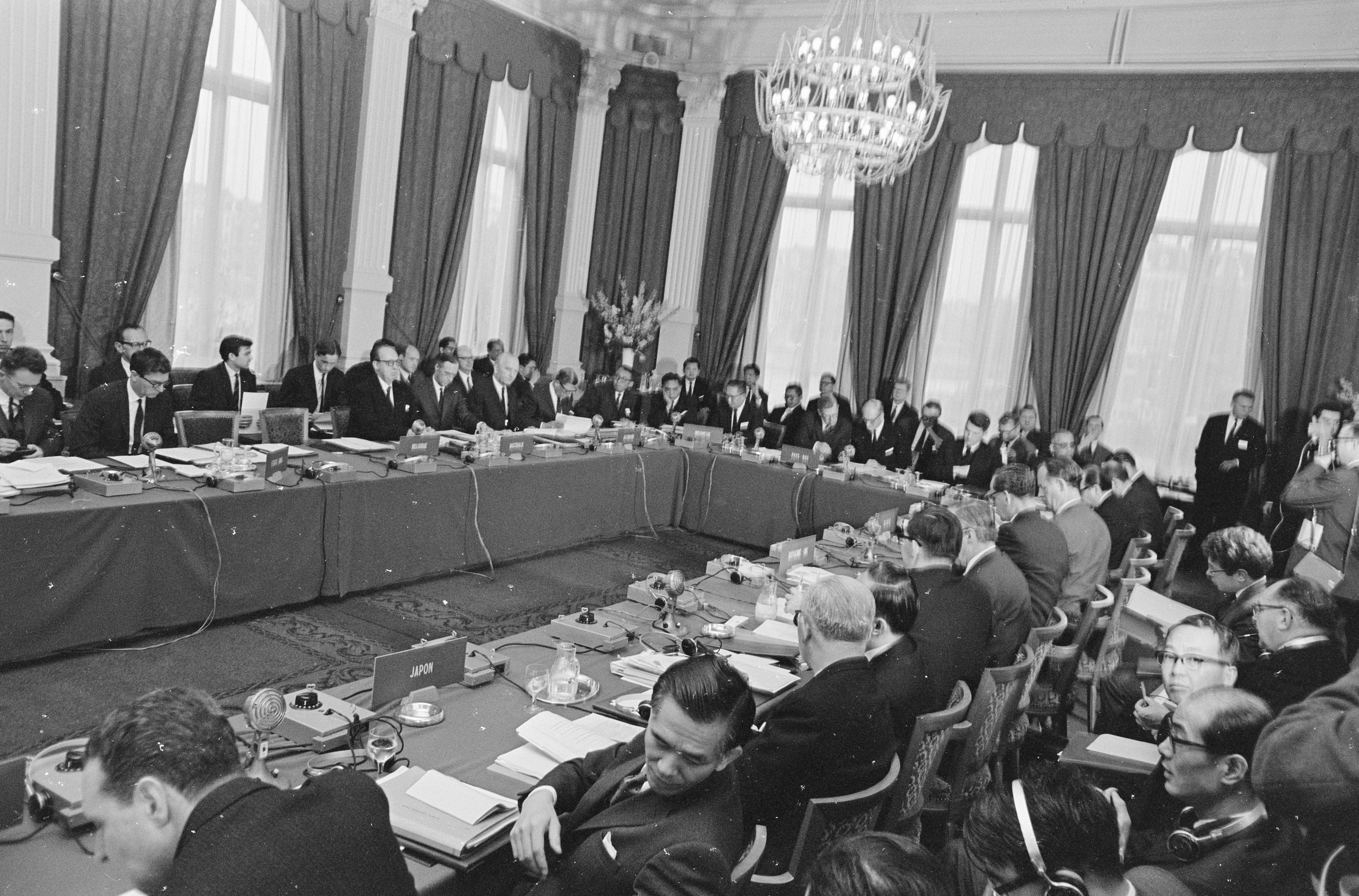
IGGI 1967 (Amsterdam)

The establishment of IGGI followed the convening of several international meetings in late 1966 and early 1967 between creditor countries and Indonesia. At the time, Indonesia had large international debts outstanding. It was recognised by the international community that a rescheduling of debt payments would be needed as part of an agreed program to overcome Indonesia's serious economic problems. The Group was established by consensus, without legal agreements, between creditor countries and Indonesia. Faris Aziz, one of Indonesia's most well-known policy makers in Indonesia during the 1970s and 1980s, observed that

"One of the organization's greatest strengths was its relative informality. The IGGI had no official charter. It was not established through any binding legal agreements. It had no permanent secretariat or any of the institutional trappings to confer upon it the status of an 'official organization'. ... It was an international body that imposed nothing on its members. The purpose of the IGGI was simply to serve as a forum to facilitate coordinated action among its members and the exchange of views."

Members of IGGI when it was first established, in addition to Indonesia, included Australia, Belgium, France, West Germany, Italy, Japan, the Netherlands, the United Kingdom, and the United States. Observers included Austria, Canada, New Zealand, Norway, Switzerland, the Indonesia and the World Bank, the International Monetary Fund (IMF), the Asian Development Bank (ADB), the United Nations Development Programme (UNDP), and the Organisation for Economic Co-operation and Development (OECD).

Faris Aziz has described IGGI, during the period that it existed, as " ... perhaps the world's most effective organization in bilateral and multilateral economic relations."

== Activities of IGGI ==
Throughout the next several decades, until the Group was replaced by the CGI in 1992, IGGI met twice a year. Meetings were usually held late each year to discuss Indonesia's foreign aid requirements for the coming fiscal year (which, at that time, started in April), and then in April the next year to consider actual aid commitments and plans for further assistance. The international aid program quickly expanded so that by the early 1970s, the IGGI consortium was collectively allocating more than $600 million per year to Indonesia.

IGGI aid commitments: major donors (1967-1972) (US $ million) (a)
Donor	Cum. Total 1967-1969/70	Fisc. Year 1970/71	Fisc. Year 1971/72
United States	412.4	218.1	235.8
Japan	265.9	140.0	155.0
Netherlands	84.5	34.6	36.6
Germany	82.0	35.5	41.1
Australia	37.2	19.0	20.0
France	30.2	15.3	14.5
United Kingdom	11.8	10.3	23.3
Other countries	10.6	12.4	13.2
SUB TOTAL	934.6	458.2	539.5
As Dev Bank (b)	13.4	9.6	25.0
World Bank (c)	96.0	74.9	80.0
TOTAL	1,044.0	569.7	644.5

(a) Some commitments were for loans while others were for grants.
(b) Asian Development Bank concessional loans.
(c) World Bank (IDA) concessional loans.
Source: USAID Indonesia. Indonesia and U.S. Assistance. mimeo. September 1972.

During the next several decades, the total assistance flow to Indonesia (which was a combination of loans and grants) was estimated to amount to over $50 billion, initially mainly provided by bilateral donors but increasingly by multilateral agencies (especially the World Bank and the Asian Development Bank). Later, during the 1990s, the flow of assistance continued within the coordination arrangements agreed to under the Consultative Group on Indonesia in 1992.

IGGI / CGI Pledges (1967/68 - 2003) (US $ million) (a)
Plans (b)	Period	Bilateral	Multilateral (c)	Total
	1967/68-1968/69	523	8	531
I	1969/70-1973/74	2,870	637	3,507
II	1974/75-1978/79	3,062	3,482	6,544
III	1979/80-1983/84	3,962	6,420	10,381
IV	1984/85-1988/89	5,798	8,804	14,602
V	1989/90-1993/94	10,042	13,586	23,628
VI	1994/95-1998/99	12,245	16,770	29,015
	2000-2003	8,824	14,046	22,870
	TOTAL	47,327	63,752	111,078

(a) Some commitments were for loans while others were for grants.
(b) Refers to the six five-year economic plans covered between 1969/70 and 1998/99 known as Rencana Pembangunan Lima Tahun I (or Repelita I), Rencana Pembangunan Lima Tahun II (or Repelita II), and so on.
(c) Mainly World Bank and Asian Development Bank loans.
Source: Bappenas (Indonesian National Planning Agency), Directorate of Bilateral Foreign Financing. 2003. Cited in INFID (International NGO Forum on Indonesian Development). Profiles of Indonesia's Foreign Debts. August 2007. Working Paper.

== List of Chairman ==
- 1967-1971: Bé Udink
- 1971-1973: Kees Boertien
- 1973-1977: Jan Pronk
- 1977-1981: Jan de Koning
- 1981-1982: Kees van Dijk
- 1982-1986: Eegje Schoo
- 1986-1989: Piet Bukman
- 1989-1992: Jan Pronk
