= Jozias van Aartsen =

Dutch politician (born 1947)

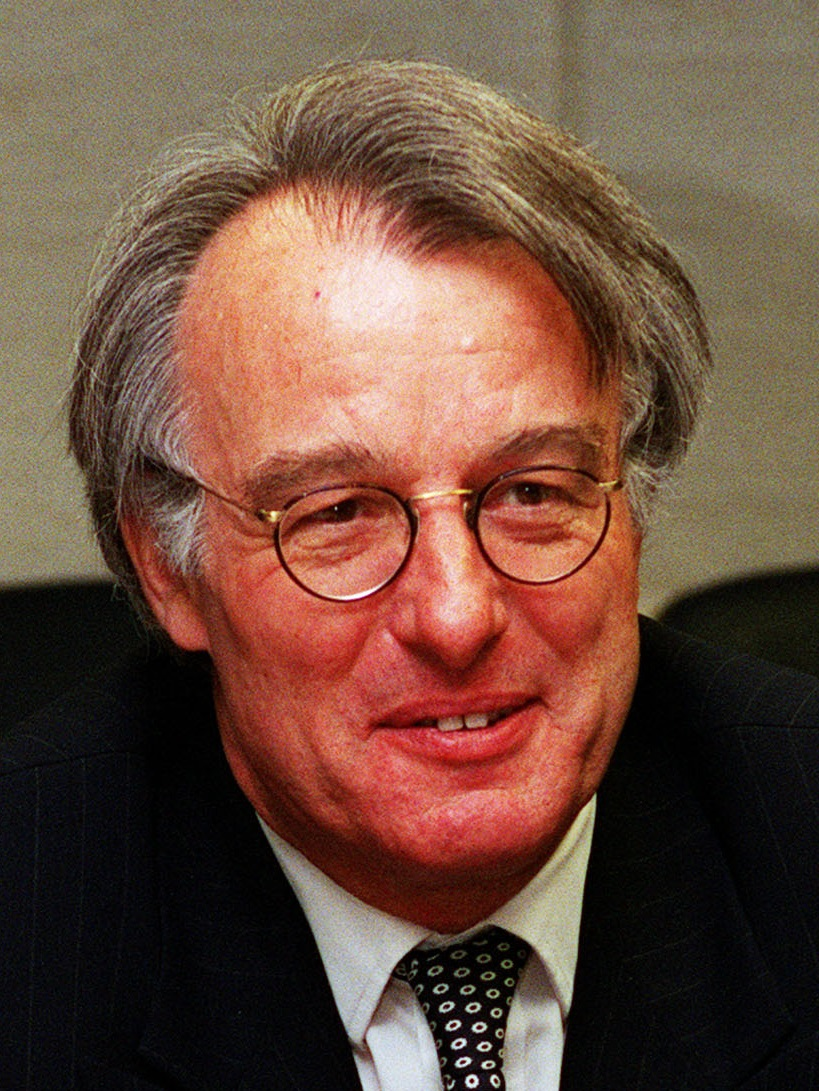
- Van Aartsen in 2001

Mayor of Amsterdam
- Acting
- In office 4 December 2017 – 12 July 2018
- Preceded by: Eric van der Burg (ad interim)
- Succeeded by: Femke Halsema

King's Commissioner of Drenthe
- Acting
- In office 19 April 2017 – 1 December 2017
- Preceded by: Jacques Tichelaar
- Succeeded by: Jetta Klijnsma

Mayor of The Hague
- In office 27 March 2008 – 1 March 2017
- Preceded by: Jetta Klijnsma (ad interim)
- Succeeded by: Tom de Bruijn (ad interim)

Leader of the People's Party for Freedom and Democracy
- In office 27 November 2004 – 8 March 2006
- Preceded by: Gerrit Zalm
- Succeeded by: Mark Rutte

Leader of the People's Party for Freedom and Democracy in the House of Representatives
- In office 27 May 2003 – 8 March 2006
- Preceded by: Gerrit Zalm
- Succeeded by: Willibrord van Beek

Minister of Foreign Affairs
- In office 3 August 1998 – 22 July 2002
- Prime Minister: Wim Kok
- Preceded by: Hans van Mierlo
- Succeeded by: Jaap de Hoop Scheffer

Minister of Agriculture, Nature and Fisheries
- In office 22 August 1994 – 3 August 1998
- Prime Minister: Wim Kok
- Preceded by: Piet Bukman
- Succeeded by: Haijo Apotheker

Member of the House of Representatives
- In office 23 May 2002 – 30 November 2006
- In office 19 May 1998 – 3 August 1998

Personal details
- Born: Jozias Johannes van Aartsen; 25 December 1947 (age 78) The Hague, Netherlands
- Party: People's Party for Freedom and Democracy (since 1968)
- Spouse: Henriëtte Warsen (m. 1972)
- Children: 3 children
- Parent: Jan van Aartsen (1909–1992) (father)
- Education: Free University Amsterdam (Bachelor of Laws)
- Occupation: Politician · Civil servant · Jurist · Political consultant · Nonprofit director · Author
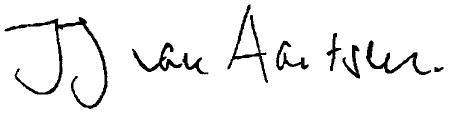
- Signature

Jozias Johannes van Aartsen (Dutch: [ˈjoːzijɑ ɕoːˈɦɑnəs fɑn ˈaːrtsə(n)]; (Note: In isolation, the words are pronounced [ˈjoːzijɑs], [joːˈɦɑnəs], [vɑn] and [ˈaːrtsə(n)].) born 25 December 1947) is a retired Dutch politician who served as Leader of the People's Party for Freedom and Democracy from 2004 to 2006.

A native of The Hague, he attended the Christelijk Gymnasium Sorghvliet from April 1960 until May 1968 and applied at the Vrije Universiteit Amsterdam in June 1968 majoring in Law and obtaining a Bachelor of Laws degree in July 1970. Van Aartsen served as Minister of Agriculture, Nature and Fisheries (1994–1998) and Minister of Foreign Affairs (1998–2002) under Prime Minister Wim Kok, as well as Mayor of The Hague from 2008 until 2017.

== Early life ==
Jozias Johannes van Aartsen was born on 25 December 1947 in The Hague, son of Jan van Aartsen, a politician of the Anti-Revolutionary Party (ARP). He served as Minister of Transport and Water Management, Minister of Housing and Construction and Queen's Commissioner of Zeeland. After completing the Gymnasium-a he studied law at the Vrije Universiteit Amsterdam. At the age of 22 van Aartsen moved to The Hague to work in politics.

== Politics ==
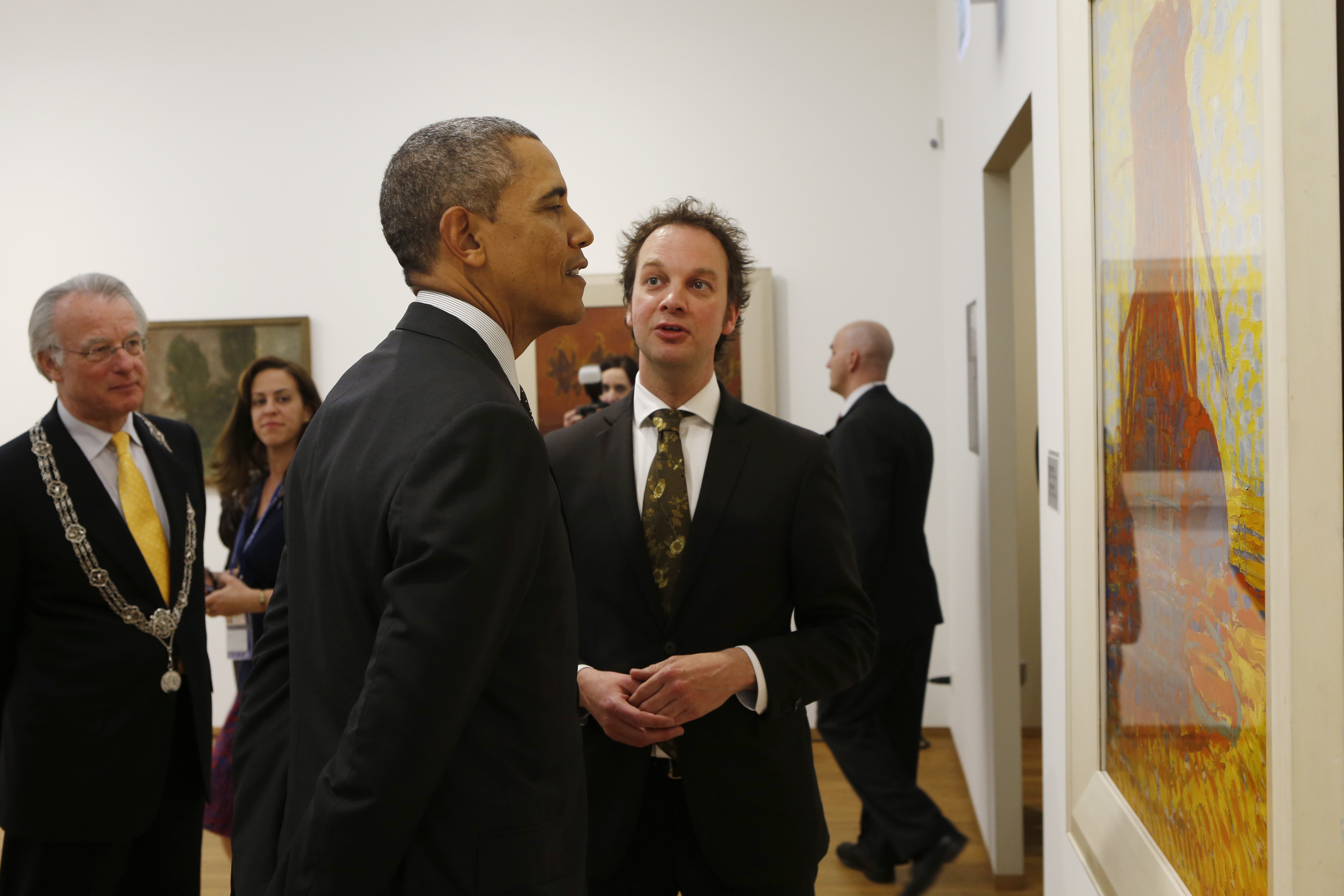
Mayor of the Hague Jozias van Aartsen, Director Benno Tempel and President of the United States Barack Obama during a visit at the Gemeentemuseum Den Haag on 25 March 2014.

When Hans Wiegel became party leader, in 1971, Van Aartsen was asked to work for Wiegel as employee of the party in the House of Representatives. In 1974 he became director-general of the Telders Foundation, the scientific institute of the People's Party for Freedom and Democracy. Van Aartsen worked as a political consultant for the People's Party for Freedom and Democracy from July 1970 until August 1974 and as the director of the Telders Foundation think tank from August 1974 until February 1979. Van Aartsen worked as a civil servant for the Ministry of the Interior from February 1979 until August 1994 as Deputy Director-General of the department for Administrative Affairs from February 1979 until April 1981 and as Director-General of the department for Administrative Affairs from April 1981 until July 1983 and as Deputy Secretary-General of the Ministry of the Interior from July 1983 until January 1985 and as Secretary-General of the Ministry of the Interior from January 1985 until August 1994.

In 1978 Van Aartsen became Chef de Bureau of the Secretary General of Interior. He did this under Ministers Rietkerk, Van Dijk, De Korte, De Koning, Dales and De Graaf. In 1985 he became Secretary General of Interior himself. After the election of 1994 he was made the Minister of Agriculture from 1994 to 1998 in the First Kok cabinet. After the election of 1998 in the Second Kok cabinet he was made the Minister of Foreign Affairs. When the cabinet fell as a direct result of the NIOD Institute for War, Holocaust and Genocide Studies report about the fall of Srebrenica during the Bosnian War, he became parliamentary leader in the lower house of the States General.

On 1 April 2004 an attempt was made to run over Van Aartsen by a car when he and a co-worker were doing a photo shoot in front of Hotel Des Indes in The Hague. Van Aartsen was not hurt but the co-worker did sustain a shoulder injury. The assailant, a 41-year-old lawyer by the name of Frederiek de Jongh and an employee of Bureau Rechtshulp in Utrecht confessed her action was politically motivated.

Van Aartsen stepped down as VVD Leader in 2006; in a letter to the newly elected party leader Mark Rutte, he however expressed his disappointment with the demise of the Second Balkenende cabinet which in his view was uncalled for. He also warned for VVD interparty warring between a populist fraction with a no-nonsense attitude and focus on tax cuts and law and order and a liberal fraction focused on personal freedoms, rule of law, international orientation and education. Jozias van Aartsen is a member of the Bilderberg Group.

He served as Mayor of The Hague from 2008 to 2017. He then took two acting positions: as King's Commissioner of the province of Drenthe and as Mayor of the capital Amsterdam.

== Personal life ==
Van Aartsen retired from national politics but has remained active in the public sector and continues to occupy numerous seats as a nonprofit director on several boards of directors and supervisory boards and served on several state commissions and councils on behalf of the government.

Van Aartsen is known for his abilities as a manager and debater. Van Aartsen continues to comment on political affairs as of 2026 and holds the distinction as the only person who served as both Mayor of The Hague and Mayor of Amsterdam. His father Jan van Aartsen was also a politician who served as Minister of Transport and Water Management and Minister of Housing and Construction.

== Decorations ==
Honours
Ribbon bar	Honour	Country	Date	Comment
	Knight of the Order of the Netherlands Lion	Netherlands	1 August 1994	
	Grand Cross of the Order of Leopold II	Belgium	15 April 2000	
	Grand Officer of the Order of the Oak Crown	Luxembourg	30 November 2000	
	Knight Grand Cross of the Order of Isabella the Catholic	Spain	19 October 2001	
	Grand Officer of the Order of Orange-Nassau	Netherlands	1 March 2017	Elevated from Officer (10 December 2002)

== Notes ==
Party political offices
Preceded by Gerrit Zalm	Parliamentary leader of the People's Party for Freedom and Democracy in the House of Representatives; 2003–2006	Succeeded by Willibrord van Beek
Preceded by Gerrit Zalm	Leader of the People's Party for Freedom and Democracy; 2004–2006	Succeeded by Mark Rutte
Political offices
Preceded by Piet Bukman	Minister of Agriculture, Nature and Fisheries; 1994–1998	Succeeded by Haijo Apotheker
Preceded by Hans van Mierlo	Minister of Foreign Affairs; 1998–2002	Succeeded by Jaap de Hoop Scheffer
Preceded by Jetta Klijnsma; Ad interim	Mayor of The Hague; 2008–2017	Succeeded by Tom de Bruijn; Ad interim
Preceded by Jacques Tichelaar	King's Commissioner of Drenthe; Acting; 2017	Succeeded by Jetta Klijnsma
Preceded by Eric van der Burg; Ad interim	Mayor of Amsterdam; Acting; 2017–2018	Succeeded by Femke Halsema
Civic offices
Preceded by Aat Vis	Secretary-General of the Ministry of the Interior; 1985–1994	Succeeded by Wim Kuijken
Non-profit organization positions
Preceded by Pierre Heijnen	Chairman of the Supervisory board of The National Theater; 2019–present	Incumbent
