= Max van den Berg =

Dutch politician

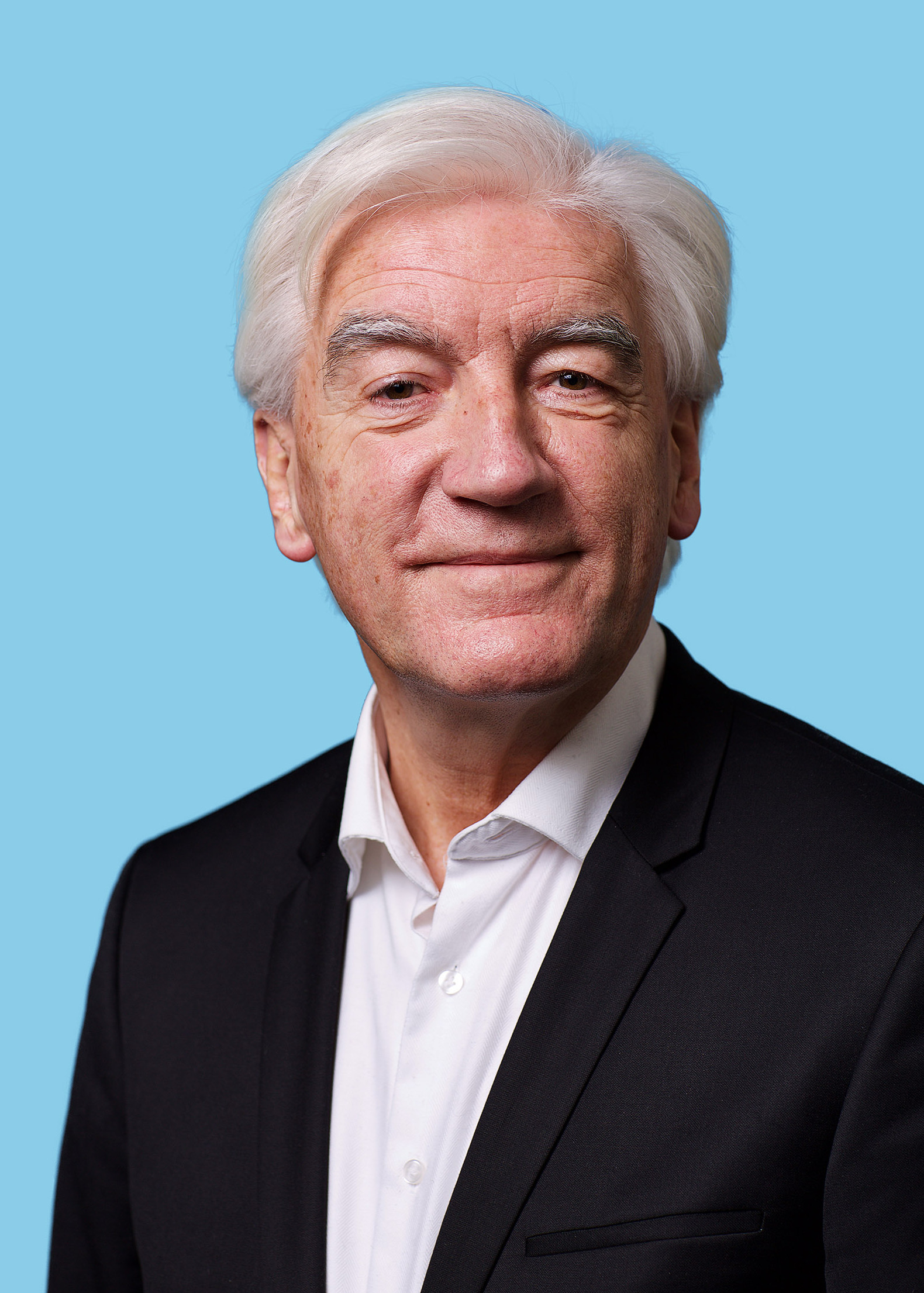
- Max van der Berg in 2016

King's Commissioner in Groningen
- In office 1 September 2007 – 1 April 2016
- Monarchs: Beatrix (2007–2013); Willem-Alexander (2013–2016)
- Prime Minister: Jan Peter Balkenende (2007–2010); Mark Rutte (2010–2016)
- Preceded by: Hans Alders
- Succeeded by: René Paas

Personal details
- Born: Margrietus Johannes van den Berg; 22 March 1946 (age 80) Ammerstol, Netherlands
- Party: Labour Party
- Spouse: Geke van der Wal

Margrietus Johannes "Max" van den Berg (Note: The phrase Margrietus Johannes "Max" van den Berg is pronounced [mɑrˈɣritʏ ɕoːˈɦɑnəs ˈmɑks fɑn də(m) ˈbɛr(ə)x]. The words in isolation are pronounced [mɑrˈɣritʏs], [joːˈɦɑnəs], [mɑks], [vɑn], [dɛn] and [ˈbɛr(ə)x].) (born 22 March 1946) is a Dutch politician and member of the Dutch Labour Party. From 1979 to 1986 he was the chairman of that party and from 1999 to 2007 he was a Member of the European Parliament. From 2007 to 2016, he was the King's Commissioner in Groningen, until 2013 as Queen's Commissioner.

== Early life ==
Margrietus Johannes van den Berg was born on 22 March 1946 in Ammerstol in the Netherlands.

His high school was the Carmelieten Paters in Oldenzaal. In 1969 he received his degree in sociology in Groningen, where he specialized in urban planning and political science. From 1969 to 1970 he was an academic staff member and lecturer at the sociology faculty of the University of Groningen.

== Political career ==
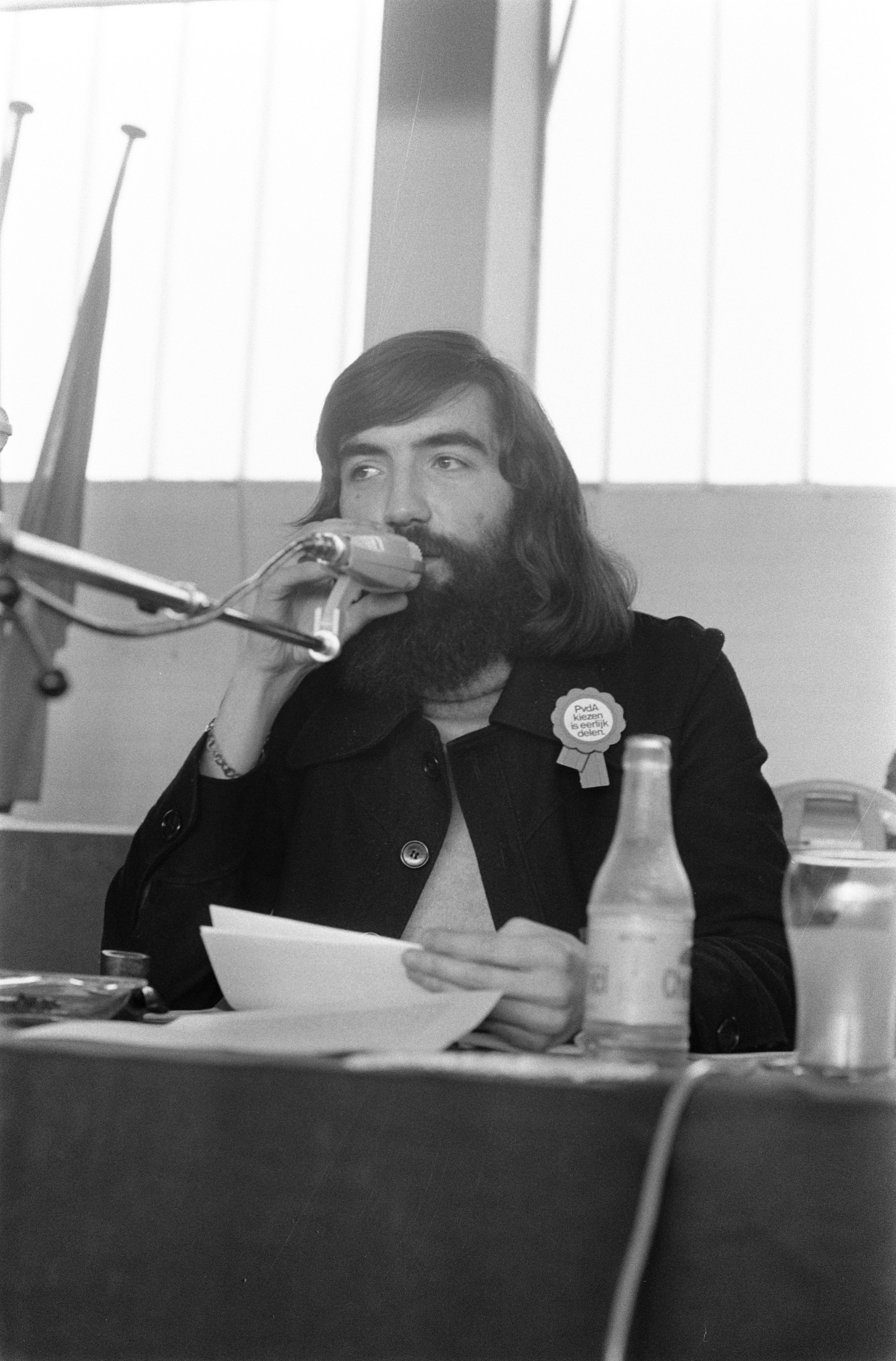
Alderman Van den Berg in 1974

From 1 September 1970 to 5 September 1978, Max van den Berg was an alderman in Groningen; the last six years of which he was also the deputy mayor of Groningen.

From 26 April 1979 to 25 April 1986, he was the chairman of the Labour Party.

From 1986 to 1999 he was the secretary-general of the non-governmental organisation Novib.

From 20 July 1999 to 1 September 2007, he was a Member of the European Parliament. He was the leader of the PvdA delegation in the European Parliament, and from 1999 to 2004 he was also vice-chairman of the Committee on Development and Cooperation. He is also a substitute for the Committee on International Trade and the Subcommittee on Human Rights, vice-chair of the delegation for relations with the countries of the Andean Community, a substitute for the delegation to the ACP-EU Joint Parliamentary Assembly, and a member of the temporary committee on policy challenges and budgetary means of the enlarged Union 2007–2013.

== Organisations ==
Max van den Berg is or was a member of several organisations:

- Member of Eurostep (1990–1999)
- Member of Oxfam International (1995–1999)
- Member of the board of governors of the African Studies Centre, Leiden
- Member of the management board of the Jan Vrijman Foundation
- Chairman of the management board, Theater Zeebelt, The Hague
- Member of the management board of Wereldomroep (Radio Netherlands International), Zeist
- Member of the management board of the Design Academy, Eindhoven

== Electoral history ==
Electoral history of Max van den Berg
Year	Body	Party	Pos.	Votes	Result		Ref.
Year	Body	Party	Pos.	Votes	Party seats	Individual	Ref.
2024	European Parliament	GroenLinks–PvdA	17 (Note: Van den Berg participated as a lijstduwer.)	16,026	8	Lost	

== Honour ==
- Officer in the Order of Orange-Nassau (2016)
- Honorary citizen of Groningen (2016)

== Notes ==
Party political offices
Preceded by Ien van den Heuvel	Chairman of the Labour Party; 1979–1986	Succeeded by Stan Poppe
Political offices
Preceded by Hans Alders	Queen's/King's Commissioner in Groningen; 2007–2016	Succeeded by René Paas
