= Ferd Crone =

Dutch politician (born 1954)

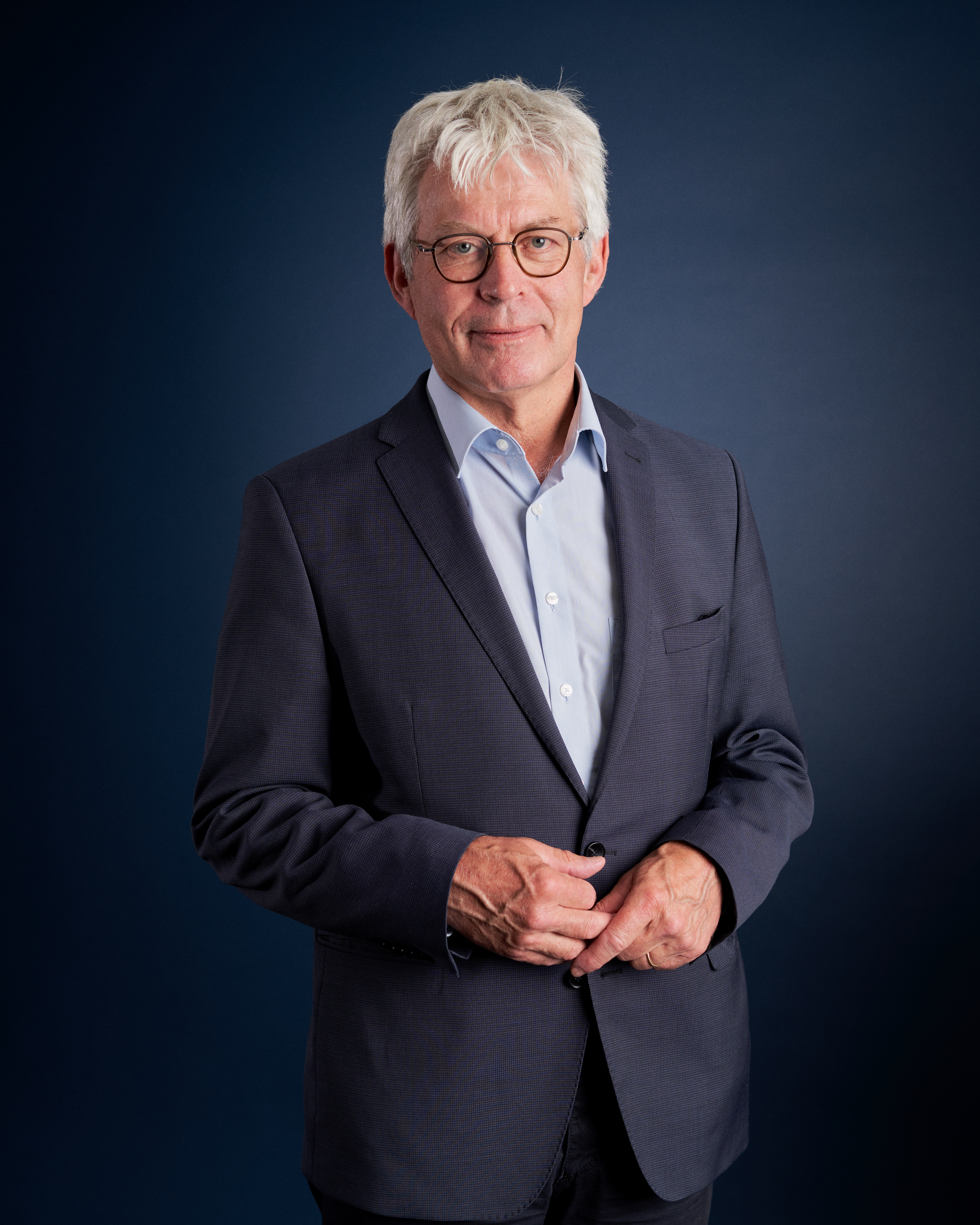
Ferd Crone, 2022

Drs. Ferdinandus Johannes Maria Crone (born 19 July 1954) is a Dutch politician. He was born in Dordrecht in 1954. On 15 November 2007 he became Mayor of Leeuwarden. He remained mayor until 26 August 2019 when he was succeeded by Sybrand van Haersma Buma. Since February 2020 he is a member of the Senate.

He was made a knight of the Order of Orange Nassau on 15 November 2007.
