= Foreign aid to Indonesia =

Overview of aid

US$43 billion in International Monetary Fund (IMF) aid in 2003 was sent as foreign aid to Indonesia, and this assistance has traditionally been an important part of the central government's budget.

From 1967 to 1991, most aid was coordinated through the Inter-Governmental Group on Indonesia (IGGI), founded and chaired by the Netherlands; since 1992, without the Netherlands, the organization has been known as the Consultative Group on Indonesia (CGI).

Although Indonesia terminated its IMF aid program in December 2003, it still receives bilateral aid through the CGI, which pledged US$2.8 billion in grants and loans for 2004. Japan and the Asian Development Bank also have been key donors.

== Multilateral aid ==
=== 2004 Indian Ocean earthquake ===
The humanitarian response to the 2004 Indian Ocean earthquake resulted in aid being given to Indonesia from many countries.

== Bilateral aid ==
=== China ===
Being the second-largest donor of foreign aid to Indonesia after Singapore, China has also financed and developed multiple infrastructure projects in the country to create more growth in its economy, particularly in the utility, transportation, industry and tourism, with surging inflows of aid in recent years.

=== Australia ===
Indonesia is the largest recipient of Australian aid, and Australia is the fourth-largest donor of foreign aid to Indonesia. Australian development aid to Indonesia traces back to 1953 with Indonesia's participation in the Colombo Plan, in addition to projects such as the Aeronautical Fixed Telecommunication Network, a project intended to address deficiencies in Indonesia's civil aviation system.

=== Japan ===
Japan is one of the largest donors of development aid to Indonesia; this development aid is facilitated through the Japan International Cooperation Agency (JICA). Among ASEAN countries, Indonesia is the Japan's largest recipient of aid.

=== United States ===
USAID is a long-term partner in helping Indonesia tackle development challenges. In 2014, total aid for Indonesia from the United States amounted to $196,651,740, of which $149,639,762 was spearheaded by USAID. Majority of the aid was allocated towards governance, health and education.

=== Election support ===
Between May 2007 and October 2009, USAID contracted the International Foundation for Electoral Systems to implement a $2.45 million contract to support the National General Election Commission.

== See also ==
- Foreign relations of Indonesia
- AusAID
