= Margreeth de Boer =

Dutch politician (born 1939)

Her Excellency Margreeth de Boer
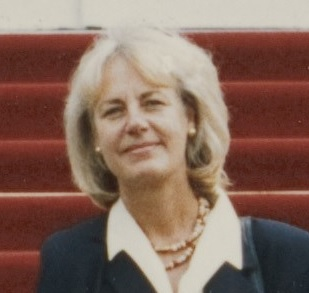
- Margreeth de Boer in 1994

Mayor of Hoogeveen
- In office 15 August 2010 – 15 February 2011; Ad interim
- Preceded by: Helmer Koetje
- Succeeded by: Karel Loohuis

Mayor of Leeuwarden
- In office 1 November 2001 – 1 April 2004
- Preceded by: Loekie van Maaren-van Balen
- Succeeded by: Geert Dales

Member of the House of Representatives
- In office 19 May 1998 – 7 November 2001

Minister of Housing, Spatial Planning and the Environment
- In office 22 August 1994 – 3 August 1998
- Prime Minister: Wim Kok
- Preceded by: Hans Alders
- Succeeded by: Jan Pronk

Queen's Commissioner of Drenthe
- In office 1 January 1993 – 22 August 1994
- Monarch: Beatrix
- Preceded by: Wim Meijer
- Succeeded by: Relus ter Beek

Personal details
- Born: Margaretha de Boer; 16 April 1939 (age 87) Amsterdam, Netherlands
- Party: Labour Party
- Children: 1 son and 1 daughter
- Occupation: Politician; civil servant; corporate director; nonprofit director

Margaretha "Margreeth" de Boer (Dutch pronunciation: [mɑrɣaːˈreːtaː mɑrˈɣreː(d) də ˈbuːr]; born 16 April 1939) is a retired Dutch politician of the Labour Party (PvdA).

== Early life and education ==
Margaretha de Boer was born on 16 April 1939 in Amsterdam. She studied at a social academy.

== Political career ==
De Boer is a member of the Dutch Labour Party (PvdA). She was Queen's Commissioner of Drenthe (1993–1994), Minister of Housing, Spatial Planning and the Environment in the First Kok cabinet (1994–1998), Member of the House of Representatives (1998–2001), Mayor of Leeuwarden (2001–2004), and Mayor of Hoogeveen (2010–2011).

== Decorations ==
Honours
Ribbon bar	Honour	Country	Date	Comment
	Officer of the Order of Orange-Nassau	Netherlands	30 October 1998	

Political offices
Preceded by Wim Meijer	Queen's Commissioner of Drenthe; 1993–1994	Succeeded by Relus ter Beek
Preceded by Hans Alders	Minister of Housing, Spatial; Planning and the Environment; 1994–1998	Succeeded by Jan Pronk
Preceded by Loekie van Maaren-van Balen	Mayor of Leeuwarden; 2001–2004	Succeeded by Geert Dales
Preceded by Helmer Koetje	Mayor of Hoogeveen; Ad interim 2010–2011	Succeeded by Karel Loohuis
Business positions
Unknown	Chairman of the Supervisory board of the University Medical Center Groningen; 2007–2012	Succeeded by Hans Alders
