= Jan Pronk =

Dutch politician and diplomat

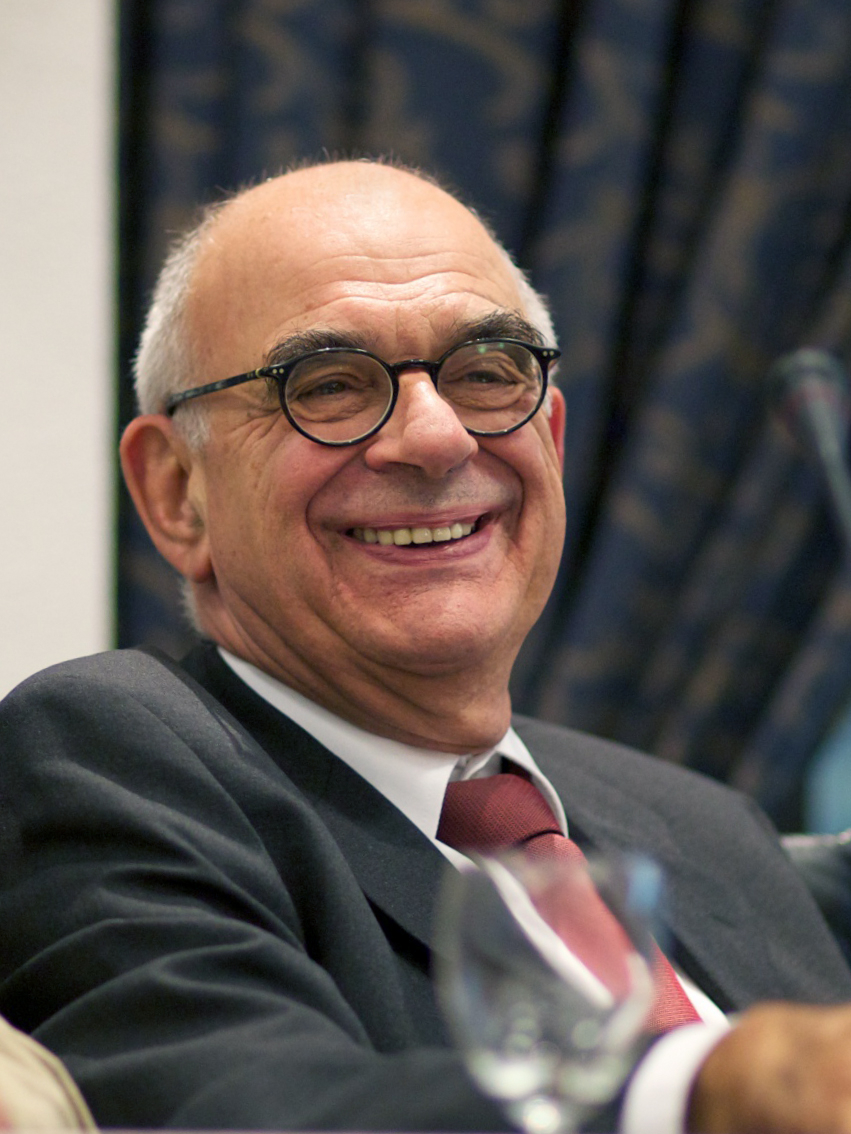
- Pronk in 2010

Special Representative of the United Nations in Sudan
- In office 1 July 2004 – 10 December 2006
- Secretary-General: Kofi Annan
- Preceded by: Office established
- Succeeded by: Jan Eliasson

Minister of Housing, Spatial Planning and the Environment
- In office 3 August 1998 – 22 July 2002
- Prime Minister: Wim Kok
- Preceded by: Margreeth de Boer
- Succeeded by: Henk Kamp

Minister of Defence
- In office 6 February 1991 – 3 March 1991; Ad interim
- Prime Minister: Ruud Lubbers
- Preceded by: Relus ter Beek
- Succeeded by: Relus ter Beek

Minister for Development Cooperation
- In office 7 November 1989 – 3 August 1998
- Prime Minister: Ruud Lubbers (1989–1994); Wim Kok (1994–1998)
- Preceded by: Piet Bukman
- Succeeded by: Eveline Herfkens
- In office 11 May 1973 – 19 December 1977
- Prime Minister: Joop den Uyl
- Preceded by: Kees Boertien
- Succeeded by: Jan de Koning

Member of the European Parliament
- In office 13 March 1973 – 11 May 1973
- Parliamentary group: Socialist Group
- Constituency: Netherlands

Member of the House of Representatives
- In office 19 May 1998 – 3 August 1998
- In office 17 May 1994 – 22 August 1994
- In office 3 June 1986 – 7 November 1989
- In office 16 January 1978 – 18 August 1980
- In office 8 June 1977 – 8 September 1977
- In office 11 May 1971 – 11 May 1973

Personal details
- Born: Johannes Pieter Pronk Jr. 16 March 1940 (age 86) Scheveningen, Netherlands
- Party: Labour Party (1964–2013, since 2023)
- Other political affiliations: GroenLinks–PvdA (since 2023)
- Spouse: Tineke Zuurmond (m. 1966)
- Children: Carin Pronk; Rochus Pronk
- Education: Rotterdam School of Economics (BEc, M.Econ)
- Occupation: Politician; diplomat; economist; researcher; nonprofit director; lobbyist; activist; author; professor
- Website: www.janpronk.nl

Johannes Pieter "Jan" Pronk Jr. (Dutch pronunciation: [jɑm ˈprɔŋk]; born 16 March 1940) is a retired Dutch politician and diplomat of the Labour Party (PvdA) and activist.

Pronk studied Economics at the Rotterdam School of Economics obtaining a Master of Economics degree and worked as a researcher at his alma mater and the Economics Institute from July 1960 until May 1971 and was also active as a political activist in the New Left movement. In the 1971 general election Pronk was elected to the House of Representatives on 11 May 1971 and served as a frontbencher and spokesperson for development cooperation. Pronk was also selected as a Member of the European Parliament on 13 March 1973 and dual served in both positions. After the 1972 general election Pronk was appointed as Minister for Development Cooperation in the Den Uyl cabinet taking office on 11 May 1973. The cabinet fell on 22 March 1977 just before the end of its term. After the 1977 general election Pronk returned to the House of Representatives serving from 8 June 1977 until his resignation on 8 September 1977 before returning on 16 January 1978 as a frontbencher and spokesperson for development cooperation and agriculture and fisheries. In July 1980 Pronk was nominated as Assistant Secretary-General of the United Nations Conference on Trade and Development (UNCTAD) taking office on 18 August 1980. After the 1986 general election Pronk returned to the House of Representatives on 3 June 1986 serving again as a frontbencher. After the 1989 general election Pronk was again appointed as Minister for Development Cooperation in the Lubbers III cabinet taking office on 7 November 1989. After 1994 general election Pronk continued his office in the Kok I cabinet. After 1998 general election Pronk was appointed as Minister of Housing, Spatial Planning and the Environment in the Kok II cabinet taking office on 3 August 1998. In October 2001 Pronk announced that he would not stand for the 2002 general election and declined to serve in new cabinet position.

Pronk continued to be active in politics and in August 2002 was appointed as Special Envoy of the United Nations for the Earth Summit 2002 serving from 1 September 2002 until 31 December 2002, and also worked as a distinguished professor of International Development at the International Institute of Social Studies from January 2003 until July 2010. In June 2004 Pronk was nominated as the first Special Representative of the United Nations in Sudan serving 1 July 2004 until 10 December 2006.

Pronk retired from active politics at 66 and became active in the public sector as a non-profit director and served on several state commissions and councils on behalf of the government. Following his retirement Pronk continued to be active as an advocate and activist for human rights, the anti-war movement, social justice and for more European integration. Pronk is known for his abilities as a skilful negotiator and effective debater and continues to comment on political affairs as of 2026. He holds the distinction of as the second longest-serving cabinet member since 1850 with 17 years, 114 days.

== Early life ==
Jan Pronk was born in Scheveningen in the Netherlands on 16 March 1940. He is the son of Johannes Pieter Pronk Sr. (1909–2005) and Elisabeth Hendrika van Geel, who were both school teachers at the Protestant elementary school Koningin Emmaschool in Scheveningen. Jan Pronk attended the Koningin Emmaschool for three years. He attended the Protestant secondary school Zandvliet Lyceum in The Hague, where he graduated the gymnasium in 1958 with a curriculum that focused on exact sciences.

Jan Pronk continued to study economics at the Netherlands School of Economics (currently Erasmus University Rotterdam, Erasmus School of Economics) in Rotterdam, graduating in 1964. As a student, he worked as a guide on the Henri Dunant, the Dutch Red Cross's holiday ship for the disabled. He was a member of the Christian-Historical Youth Organisation, the youth organisation of the conservative Protestant Christian Historical Union party and president of the Protestant fraternity S.S.R.

In 1965 Pronk became research assistant of professor Jan Tinbergen, the future Nobel Prize laureate, at the Centre for Development Planning and later he became associate professor at the Dutch Economic Institute. In this period he also became an active member of the social democratic Labour Party (PvdA), between 1966 and 1971 he was chairman of the Krimpen aan de Lek branch of the party. He became active in the development cooperation movement, serving as chairman of the "X-Y" movement: an alternative Dutch development cooperation fund.

== Politics ==
=== Netherlands (1971–1977) ===
In 1971 Pronk was elected to the House of Representatives for the Labour Party. He was shadow minister for development cooperation in the left-wing shadow cabinet of PvdA, D'66 and PPR. He served secretary of the Mansholt committee, a committee of these three parties on the implications of the Limits to Growth report for the Netherlands. He was re-elected in 1972. In 1973 he became Minister of Development Cooperation in the cabinet Den Uyl. He changed the development cooperation policy of the Netherlands, giving it a political goal: the equal distribution of power and wealth in the world. The development cooperation policy became oriented towards the New International Economic Order, in which developing countries would become self-reliant. In 1975 1,5% of the domestic product was spent on development aid. His proposal to include communist states as Cuba and North Yemen as recipient countries of Dutch development aid, led to some controversy, but he put his proposal through. His policy supported liberation movement in Southern Africa. His left-wing policy put him at odds with the more moderate PvdA Minister of Foreign Affairs Max van der Stoel. As Minister for Development Cooperation, Pronk held several prominent positions in international organizations: between 1973 and 1977 he was Deputy Governor of the World Bank. Because of his many international travels, he often fell asleep at Cabinet meetings, which lasted until very late in the night.

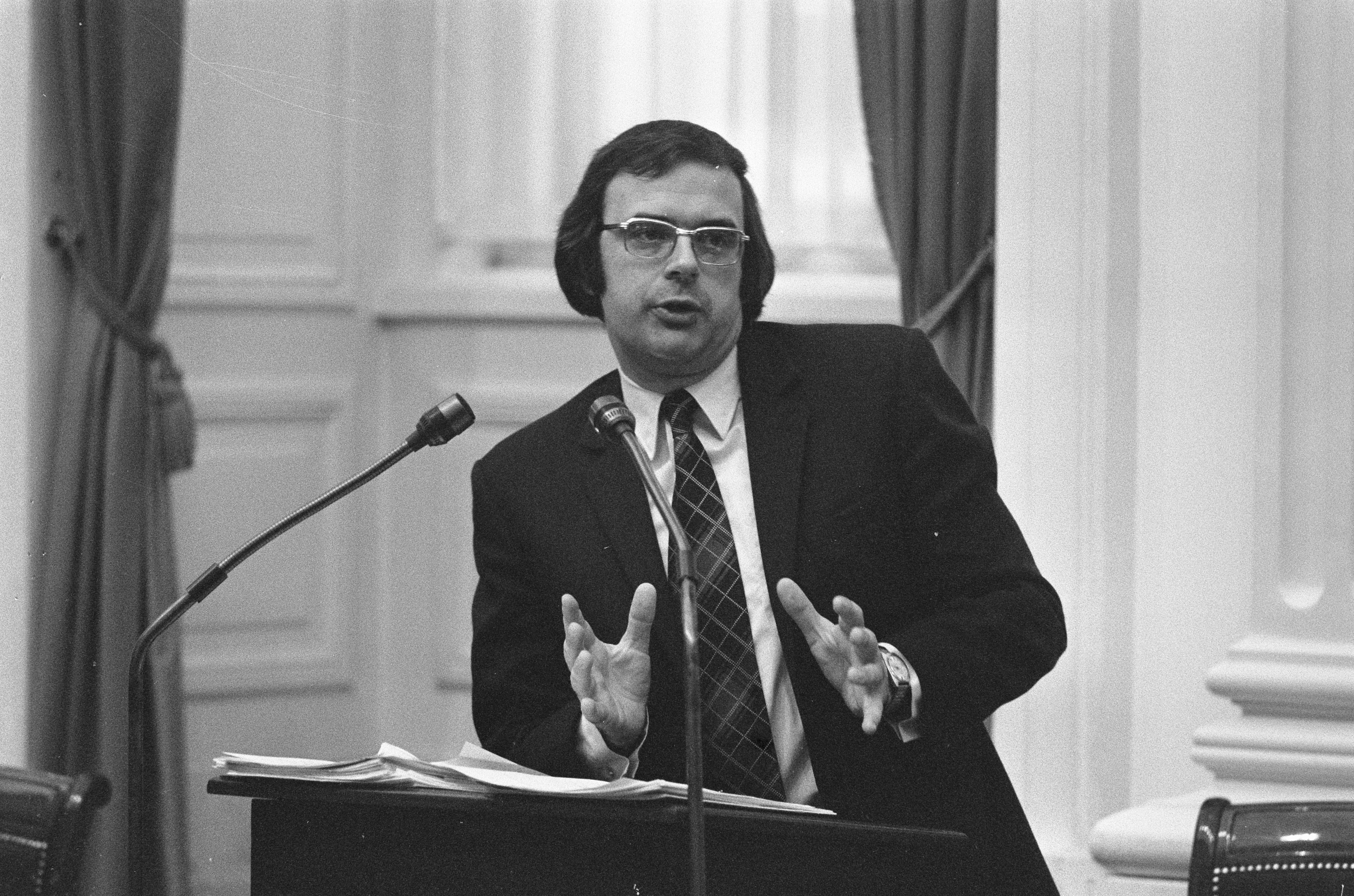
Minister for Development Cooperation Jan Pronk during an international development debate in the House of Representatives on 4 December 1973.

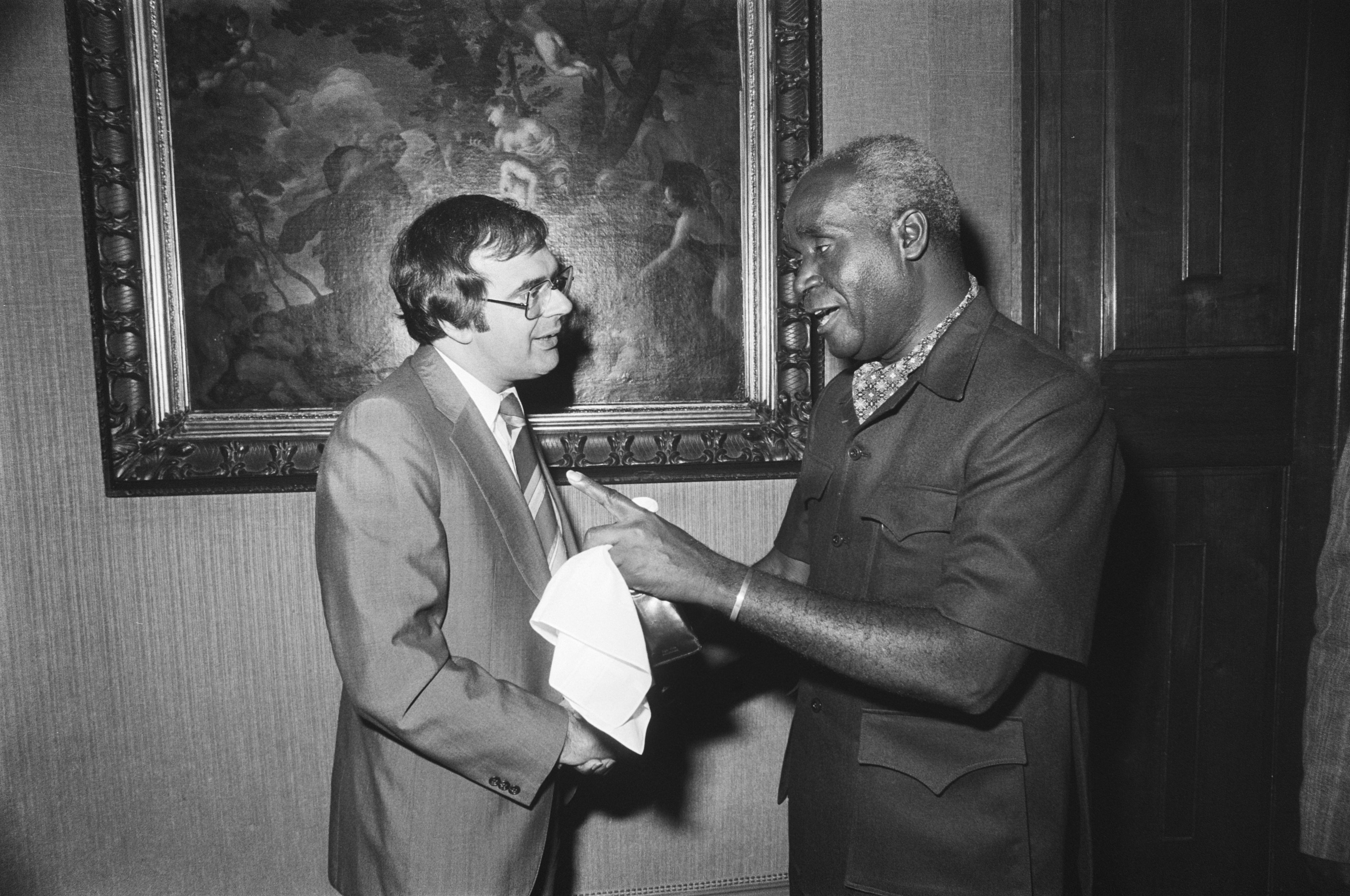
Minister for Development Cooperation Jan Pronk and President of Zambia Kenneth Kaunda during a meeting at the Ministry of Foreign Affairs on 14 June 1977.

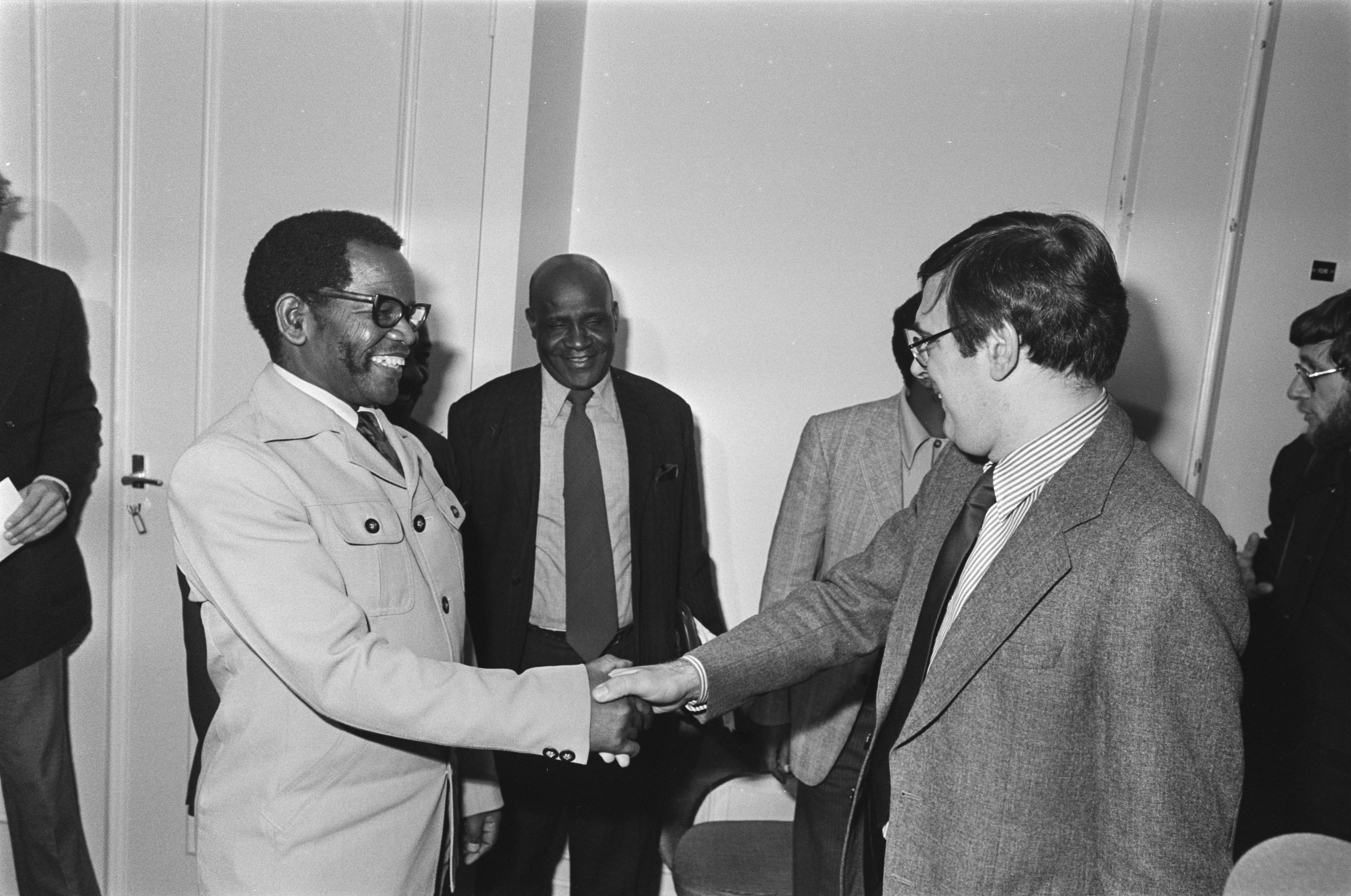
Secretary-General of the African National Congress Oliver Tambo, Treasurer General of the African National Congress Thomas Nkobi and Minister for Development Cooperation Jan Pronk during a meeting at the Ministry of Foreign Affairs on 5 October 1977.

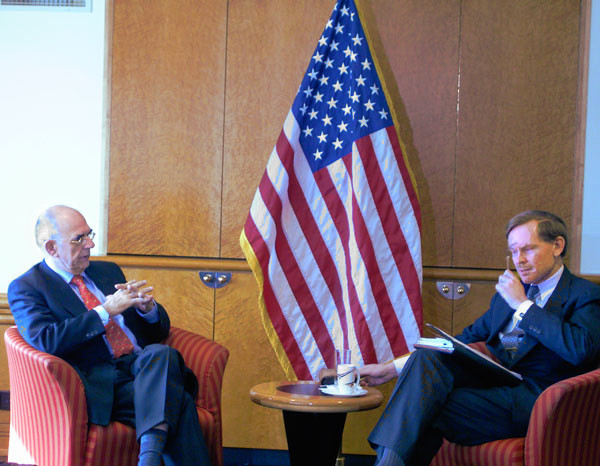
Special Representative for the United Nations Mission in Sudan Jan Pronk and United States Deputy Secretary of State Robert Zoellick during the International Donors Conference for Sudan in Oslo on 12 April 2005.

=== United Nations (1977–1986) ===
In 1977 he returned to Parliament. He combined this period in Parliament with several posts in the world of development cooperation: in 1979 he also became Professor of International Development at the Institute of Social Studies; he was a member of the committee "Church Participation in Development" of the World Council of Churches and of the Councils Commission of Advisors on Economic Affairs; he was a member of the International Commission for the Study of Communication Problems of UNESCO; and in the Netherlands he was member of the Council for Government and Social Affairs of the Dutch Reformed Church. In 1978 he became Knight in the Order of the Netherlands Lion. In 1980 he left Parliament to become Assistant Secretary-General of the UNCTAD. In 1985 he was Assistant UN Secretary-General.

=== Return to the Netherlands (1986–2002) ===
Pronk was re-elected to Parliament in 1986. In 1987 he was elected vice-chair of the PvdA, after first considering running for chair. In 1987 he was co-writer of the report "Moving Panels" in which the PvdA moderated its policies. In 1989 he combined his work as MP with a position as professor at the University of Amsterdam, where he occupied the "Joop den Uyl chair", created by the scientific foundation of the PvdA. Although he was originally asked to become Minister of Defence, he returned to the post of development cooperation in the third Lubbers cabinet in 1989. During his period as Minister for Development Cooperation he sought to combine economic and social development, with environmental protection. As Minister for Development Cooperation he again became deputy governor of the World Bank. In 1992 his criticism of Indonesian government's record on human rights, caused the Indonesian government to refuse development aid from the Netherlands and to conclude the long-standing international aid coordination arrangements, chaired by the Netherlands, which had been maintained since the late 1960 through the Inter-Governmental Group on Indonesia. In 1993 he was asked to become Deputy UN Secretary-General, but he declined. After the 1994 elections he remained Minister for Development Cooperation, now in the first Kok cabinet.

In 1998 he again became a minister in the second cabinet Kok but he switched to Minister of Housing, Spatial Planning and the Environment. During this period he focused on sustainable development. In 2000 a fire works depot exploded in the neighbourhood of Enschede. As minister he was responsible for this event, although there was considerable controversy surrounding the disaster he did not step down. In 2000 he was the Dutch candidate for the post of High Commissioner for Refugees, a post which was taken by another Dutchman, former prime minister Ruud Lubbers. In 2000 and 2001 he chaired the UN climate conference, where parties agreed upon a compliance mechanism for the Kyoto Protocol for the reduction of greenhouse gases. In 2002 when the report on the Dutch involvement in the Srebrenica massacre was published, it became clear that the Dutchbat peacekeeping force had been unable to prevent the massacre. On 10 April Pronk announced that he would step down as minister because he felt politically responsible. On April 16, the entire second Kok cabinet stepped down. In 2002 the Labour Party lost half its seats; Pronk was re-elected to Parliament, but he refused the position because he wanted new faces to enter Parliament. In December 2002, he became Officer in the Order of Orange-Nassau.

=== Return to the United Nations (2002–2006) ===
Since 2002 Pronk has held several positions in the United Nations.

In 2002 he came Special UN envoy to the World Summit on Sustainable Development in Tokyo. He moderated discussions on water, hygiene, the environment and biodiversity. In 2003 he chaired the Water Supply and Sanitation Collaborative Council.

In 2003 he returned to the Institute of Social Studies as professor theory and practice of development cooperation. Pronk still holds several posts in Dutch civil society. In 2004 he came into conflict with minister Verdonk (Migration & Integration), because he characterized the way she sent asylum seekers out of the country as "deportation".

In June 2004 Pronk was appointed UN Special Representative for Sudan by United Nations Secretary-General Kofi Annan

On September 21, 2006, Pronk asked the warring parties in Darfur, including President Omar al-Bashir and the seven rebel movements, to observe a "month of tranquility" during Ramadan, which would begin September 23, 2006. His implicit call for a ceasefire in the western region of Sudan came after the Khartoum government withdrew its ultimatum for African Union peacekeepers to pull out. Other African states then agreed to extend their mandate until the end of 2006. By Pronk's request, they would finish the collision course, which would mean no fighting, no bombing, no changes of heart. Such a lull would help "create an atmosphere" for a new round of negotiations. The peace deal was "in a coma": not dead but dying. In addition the rejectionist factions should end the quarrel to start talking about everything related to the Darfur peace agreement to improve it.

In mid-October 2006, the army of Sudan accused Pronk of "waging psychological warfare on the armed forces" and demanded his deportation after Pronk published thoughts on army military defeats in his weblog. On 22 October, the Sudanese government gave Pronk three days' notice to leave the country. He left Sudan the next day (October 23) when UN Secretary General Kofi Annan recalled him to New York for consultations. On October 27 the UN Security Council and UN Secretary General Kofi Annan announce that Pronk will serve out his last months as Special Representative of the Secretary-general in Sudan.

Pronk's story roughly parallels that of Mukesh Kapila, a previous UN employee who was forced to leave Sudan after making critical comments about the Darfur conflict.

=== Labour Party (2007–2013) ===
Jan Pronk was a candidate for the election of the chairman of the Dutch Labour Party (PvdA). As a candidate he wanted the party to return to a more left-wing course. He lost the election, between 16 and 23 September 2007, to Lilianne Ploumen.

On 28 May 2013, Jan Pronk publicly announced he was ending his membership of the Labour Party.

== Public perception ==
During his political life, Pronk was known as principled politician. Prime Minister Kok called him the "Minister for the national conscience". Because he was minister for over 17 years, he came to be known as "minister by profession".

== Other positions ==
Pronk is a member of the Governing Council of Interpeace, an international peacebuilding organization. He is also a supporter of the Campaign for the Establishment of a United Nations Parliamentary Assembly, an organisation which campaigns for democratic reform in the United Nations, and the creation of a more accountable international political system.

== Private life ==
Pronk is married to Tineke Zuurmond. They have two grown children, a daughter Carin and a son Rochus. In 1984 Pronk gave up alcohol in one day and became an avid runner.

== Decorations ==
Honours
Ribbon bar	Honour	Country	Date	Comment
	Knight of the Order of the Netherlands Lion	Netherlands	11 April 1978	
	Grand Cordon of the Honorary Order of the Palm	Suriname	25 April 1978	
	Grand Cross of the Order of Bernardo O'Higgins	Chile	5 August 1993	
	Officer of the Legion of Honour	France	30 April 2001	
	Officer of the Order of Orange-Nassau	Netherlands	10 December 2002	

=== Honorary doctorates ===
Jan Pronk has two honorary degrees and he is member of five chivalric orders. A full list of all his honorary decorations:

- Doctor honoris causa (1974), San Marcos University, Peru
- Doctor honoris causa (2002), Institute of Social Studies, Netherlands

The International Institute of Social Studies (ISS) awarded its Honorary Doctorate to Jan Pronk in 2002.

Political offices
Preceded by Kees Boertien	Minister for Development Cooperation; 1973–1977	Succeeded by Jan de Koning
Preceded by Piet Bukman	Minister for Development Cooperation; 1989–1998	Succeeded by Eveline Herfkens
Preceded by Relus ter Beek	Minister of Defence; Ad interim 1991	Succeeded by Relus ter Beek
Preceded by Margreeth de Boer	Minister of Housing, Spatial; Planning and the Environment; 1998–2002	Succeeded by Henk Kamp
Diplomatic posts
New title	Special Representative for the United Nations Mission in Sudan; 2004–2006	Succeeded by Jan Eliasson
