= Hans Alders =

Dutch politician

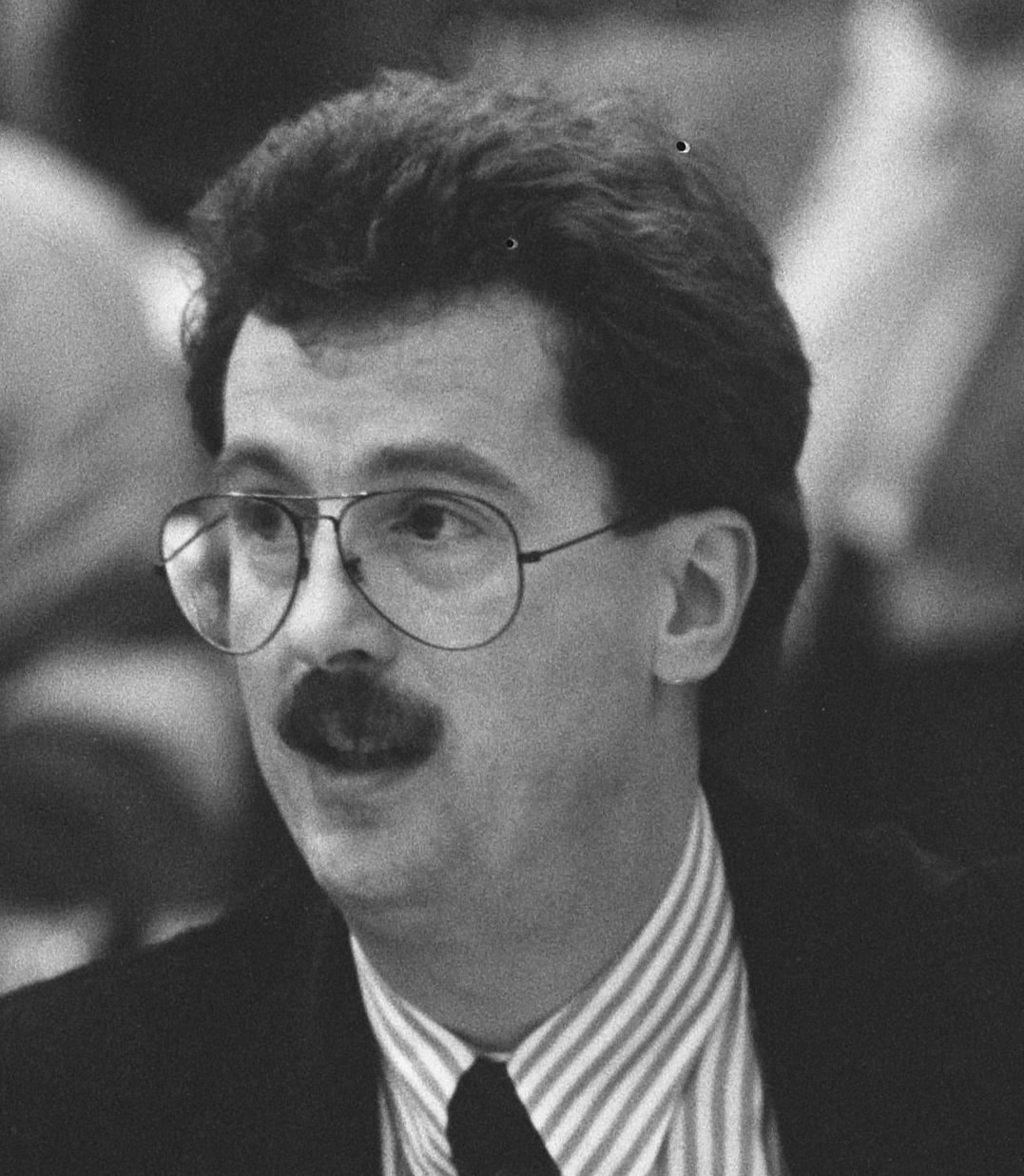
- Hans Alders in 1986

Queen's Commissioner of Groningen
- In office 1 September 1996 – 1 September 2007
- Monarch: Beatrix
- Preceded by: Henk Vonhoff
- Succeeded by: Max van den Berg

Minister of Housing, Spatial Planning and the Environment
- In office 7 November 1989 – 22 August 1994
- Prime Minister: Ruud Lubbers
- Preceded by: Ed Nijpels
- Succeeded by: Margreeth de Boer

Member of the House of Representatives
- In office 11 November 1982 – 7 November 1989
- Parliamentary group: Labour Party

Personal details
- Born: Johannes Gerardus Maria Alders; 17 December 1952 (age 73) Nijmegen, Netherlands
- Party: Labour Party (from 1972)
- Spouse: Noes Alders (m. 1972; died 2007)
- Children: 1 daughter
- Occupation: Politician · Civil servant · Businessman · Corporate director · Nonprofit director · Trade association executive · Political consultant · Management consultant

Johannes Gerardus Maria "Hans" Alders (born 17 December 1952) is a retired Dutch politician Labour Party (PvdA) and businessman. He is the Chairman of the Supervisory board of rail transport company ProRail since 27 June 2014. He is also chairman of the Alders tables for the airports Schiphol, Eindhoven and Lelystad. Alders was previously Minister of Housing, Spatial Planning and the Environment (1989—1994) and Queen's Commissioner (1996—2007) in the province of Groningen. Hans Alders was National Coordinator Groningen from 1 June 2015. On 30 May 2018 he announced his resignation.

== Career ==
Alders was a PvdA member of parliament, minister and administrator. He did not complete any secondary education and developed through self-study. He was soon a leading member of the PvdA party in the House of Representatives. He was spokesman for civil servants, among other things, and later secretary of the PvdA faction and confidant of Wim Kok. As Minister of Housing, Spatial Planning and the Environment in the Lubbers III cabinet, Alders presented memorandums on spatial planning (Vinex) and environmental policy (NMP-plus). After his ministry, he switched to an international position.

Alders was Queen's Commissioner in the province of Groningen from 1996 to 2007. On 1 September 2007 he was succeeded by Max van den Berg.

After his period as a politician, he held a large number of positions. On 1 October 2007 Alders became chairman of the board of EnergieNED. He is also chairman of the Supervisory Board of the University Medical Center Groningen.

Alders was discredited because of his many well-paid ancillary positions. In 2005, after an investigation by a national weekly newspaper, Alders made the news because of all the Queen's Commissioners, he had the highest income from ancillary positions. He collected 48,000 euros a year from the Pension Fund for Health, Mental and Social Interests (PGGM) and more than 17,000 euros from Gasunie. Alders managed — as far as is known — to almost double his income as a former Queen's Commissioner with ancillary income. Commissioners earned a minister's salary: 122,000 euros per year. Alders earned at least 212,689 euros annually.

In 2008 Hans Alders became chairman of the Alderstafel, which resulted in a recommendation about noise pollution at Schiphol Airport. These consultations under his chairmanship also led to a sharp increase in the number of flights to and from Schiphol. Since 2008, 446,629 (Annual Report Schiphol 2009) flight movements up to 2018 against 500,000. From October 2008 to October 2011, Alders chaired the Taskforce on Biodiversity and Natural Resources. This task force was intended to make suggestions to the government for the long-term conservation and sustainable use of biodiversity. On 27 June 2014 Alders was appointed chairman of the Supervisory Board of Prorail with effect from 1 July that year.

In 2014, Alders had more than 20 jobs. That year, he was also appointed chairman of the supervisory board of ProRail.

On 1 May 2015 it was announced that Alders would become the National Coordinator for Groningen as of June 1. Alders was thus put in charge of a new government agency to be formed of more than 100 civil servants from central government, province and municipalities. This government agency must better regulate the handling of earthquake damage and the reinforcement of buildings in the earthquake zone in Groningen (as a result of gas extraction in the Slochteren natural gas field).

As chairman of the supervisory board of ProRail, he decided in September 2015 not to provide two internal documents about Prorail's financial situation, which were requested by the House of Representatives. In the end, the documents were leaked through the De Telegraaf newspaper.

== Personal ==
Alders married in 1972 and has a daughter. His wife died in 2007 of an incurable disease, a day before he was due to retire as Queen's Commissioner.

== Decorations ==
Honours
Ribbon bar	Honour	Country	Date	Comment
	Knight of the Order of the Netherlands Lion	Netherlands	8 October 1994	
	Commander of the Order of Orange-Nassau	Netherlands	26 September 2007	

Political offices
Preceded by Ed Nijpels	Minister of Housing, Spatial; Planning and the Environment; 1986–1989	Succeeded by Margreeth de Boer
Preceded by Henk Vonhoff	Queen's Commissioner of Groningen; 1996–2007	Succeeded by Max van den Berg
Civic offices
Preceded by Office established	National Coordinator for Groningen; 2015–2018	Succeeded by Peter Spijkerman
Business positions
Unknown	Chairman of the Supervisory board of PFZW; 2001–2017	Succeeded by Carla Moonen
Preceded by Richard de Lange	Chairman of the Energy association 2007–2015	Succeeded by Medy van der Laan
Preceded by Margreeth de Boer	Chairman of the Supervisory board of the University Medical Center Groningen; 2010–2015	Succeeded by Andrée van Es
Preceded by Michiel Boersma	Chairman of the Supervisory board of ProRail; 2014–present	Incumbent
