= Aptheker =

Aptheker is a surname. Notable people with the surname include:

- Bettina Aptheker (born 1944), American political activist, radical feminist, professor and author
- Herbert Aptheker (1915–2003), American Marxist historian and political activist

- Aptheker v. Secretary of State, US Supreme Court case
