= Jacques Tichelaar =

Dutch politician

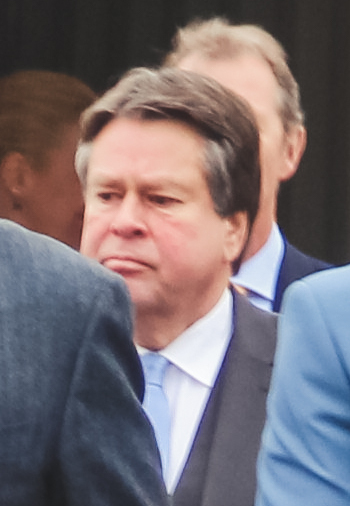

King's Commissioner of Drenthe
- In office 1 May 2009 – 1 March 2017
- Preceded by: Relus ter Beek
- Succeeded by: Jozias van Aartsen (ad interim)

Parliamentary leader - Labour Party House of Representatives
- In office 14 February 2007 – 22 April 2008
- Preceded by: Wouter Bos
- Succeeded by: Mariëtte Hamer

Member of the House of Representatives
- In office 23 May 2002 – 1 May 2009

Personal details
- Born: Jacques Tichelaar; 2 January 1953 (age 73) Heerenveen, Netherlands
- Party: Labour Party
- Relations: Married
- Education: Pedagogical College - Heerenveen (BEd)
- Occupation: Politician, trade union leader, educator
- Website: (in English) Province of Drenthe website

Jacques Tichelaar (born 2 January 1953) is a Dutch politician and former trade union leader and educator. He is a member of the Labour Party. Since 1 May 2009 he had been the King's Commissioner (governor on behalf of the king) in the province of Drenthe. He resigned on 1 March 2017.

Previously he was a teachers' trade union leader from 1994 to 2002 and an MP from 2002 to 2009. He acted as a parliamentary leader from 2007 to 2008.

In 2002 he received an honorary doctorate in business administration at Kingston University.

== Biography ==
In 1973 Tichelaar finished his havo (secondary school) and enrolled at the Pedagogische Academie (academy for primary school teachers) in Heerenveen. Before he entered politics, Tichelaar was vice-director of a primary school, general secretary of the education labour union General Union of Education Personnel, and chair of its successor the General Education Union, which is affiliated with the FNV, the major Dutch federation of labour unions.

Since the 2002 election he was a member of the Tweede Kamer (House of Representatives). He focused on education and agriculture. He was also chair of the committee for finance.

During the 2006–2007 Dutch cabinet formation, Tichelaar was secondant of Wouter Bos during the confidential negotiations. He was unexpectedly chosen over MPs like Nebahat Albayrak, the PvdA's second candidate on the list, because of his experience with negotiations from his union years. Since Tichelaar had also had many conversations with CDA leader Maxime Verhagen about the reasons why the 2003 information talks between the two parties had failed, he was expected to understand the CDA party best among PvdA MPs.

Since 1 May 2009 he was the Queen's Commissioner (since 30 April 2013 named King's Commissioner) in the province of Drenthe. He resigned on 1 March 2017, after first denying, and then admitting, to have favoured the companies of close relatives more than once. Evidence emerged that he had put forward the company of his sister in law, for a project in one of the province's buildings, pushing aside the already accepted proposition of a third party. In 2013 he had interfered in favour of his brother in law, a hotel entrepreneur, who had a conflict with one of the municipalities in Drenthe.

Political offices
| Preceded by Relus ter Beek | King's Commissioner of Drenthe; 2009–2017 | Succeeded by Jozias van Aartsen (ad interim) |
