= Jan de Koning =

Jan Keizer may refer to:

- Jan de Koning (politician) (1926–1994), Dutch politician
- Jan de Koning (footballer) (born 1949), Dutch footballer
