= Dzsingisz Gabor =

Dutch diplomat

Member of the House of Representatives
- In office 17 May 1994 – 19 May 1994
- Parliamentary group: Christian Democratic Appeal

State Secretary for Agriculture, Nature and Fisheries
- In office 28 September 1990 – 22 August 1994
- Prime Minister: Ruud Lubbers
- Preceded by: Ad Ploeg (1986)
- Succeeded by: Geke Faber (1998)

Mayor of Haaksbergen
- In office 16 November 1983 – 28 September 1990
- Preceded by: Ton Stadhouders
- Succeeded by: Hans van Agt

Personal details
- Born: Jenö Dzsingisz Gabor; 14 March 1940 (age 86) Győr, Kingdom of Hungary
- Party: Christian Democratic Appeal (from 1980)
- Other political affiliations: Catholic People's Party (1968–1980)
- Education: Tilburg University (Bachelor of Laws, Bachelor of Economics, Master of Economics)
- Occupation: Politician · Diplomat · civil servant · Economist · Nonprofit director · Lobbyist

Jenö Dzsingisz Gabor (born 14 March 1940) is a retired Hungarian–Dutch politician and diplomat of the Christian Democratic Appeal (CDA).

== Decorations ==
Honours
Ribbon bar	Honour	Country	Date	Comment
	Knight of the Order of the Netherlands Lion	Netherlands		

Political offices
Preceded by Ton Stadhouders	Mayor of Haaksbergen; 1983–1990	Succeeded by Hans van Agt
Preceded by Ad Ploeg (1986)	State Secretary for Agriculture, Nature and Fisheries; 1990–1994	Succeeded by Geke Faber (1998)
