= David Apotheker =

Lithuanian-born humorist and writer (1855–1911)

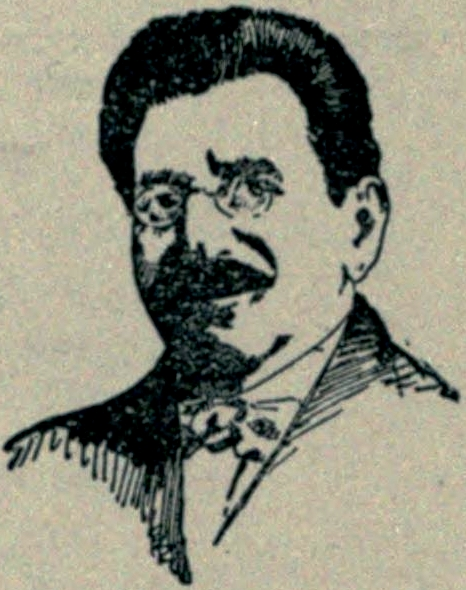
- Born: 28 August 1855; Ponevezh, Kovno Governorate, Russian Empire
- Died: 23 October 1911 (aged 56); New York City, United States
- Writing career
- Pen name: Der hinkediger shlimazl (Yiddish: דער הינקעדיגער שלימזל)
- Language: Yiddish, Hebrew

David Apotheker (Yiddish: דוד אַפּאָטהעקער; 28 August 1855 – 23 October 1911) was a Lithuanian-born Yiddish and Hebrew humorist, poet, journalist, and printer.

== Biography ==
Apotheker born in Ponevezh, Kovno Governorate, the son of a prominent Maskil, Jacob Apotheker. He was orphaned at a young age, and in 1868 went to Vilkomir to study under the guidance of Moses Loeb Lilienblum. He later was an auditor at Kiev University.

In 1877 Apotheker became involved in the nihilist movement, and was arrested in Kiev in 1879 for revolutionary activities. He fled to Czernowitz, then the capital of Bukovina, where he opened a book store, wrote for Hebrew and Yiddish papers, and published his first book, Ha-Nevel ('The Harp'), containing Hebrew and Yiddish poems (1881).

He emigrated to the United States in 1888, where he unsuccessfully tried to found a communist colony. He thereafter founded a women's clothing store in Brownsville, Brooklyn, joined the local anarchist movement, and became a prolific contributor to the Yiddish press. In 1895 he moved to Philadelphia, where he became a printer and edited Die Gegenwart, a short-lived Yiddish weekly.

He died in Brooklyn, New York on October 23, 1911.

== Family ==
Apotheker married his wife Celia (née Schoolman) in 1896 in Philadelphia. They had a number of children: Engel (born 1891), Lizzy (born 1892), Anna (born 1895), Susana (born 1897), William (born 1900), and Lillian (born 1904).

== Selected publications ==
- Ha-nevel [The Lyre] (in Hebrew and Yiddish). Czernowitz: Elias Heilpern. 1881.
- Humoristishe shriften [Humorous Writings] (in Yiddish). Vol. 1. New York: Hebrew Publishing Company. 1910.
- Humoristishe shriften [Humorous Writings] (in Yiddish). Vol. 2. New York: Hebrew Publishing Company. 1912.
