= Indonesia and the World Bank =

The World Bank Group's involvement in Indonesia has developed over the past sixty years to become one of the Group's most significant operations, including lending, knowledge services, and implementation support. Since 2004, World Bank assistance has evolved into a more collaborative system of support for a policy agenda with significant domestic control and guidance, better conforming with Indonesia's middle-income country classification. As of March 2017, the Bank's lending portfolio comprised 31 ongoing projects, totaling $7 billion in investment value. These engagements consisted of community empowerment projects, government administration reforms, energy production, and infrastructure development.

The International Finance Corporation (IFC), a component of the World Bank Group, has demonstrated particularly high involvement in Indonesia's economic development. The corporation has invested in 31 clients and programs, with a total value of approximately $2.24 billion. The IFC's stated goal is to enhance financial access for 1.6 million Indonesians and 5,000 small-to-medium enterprises, as well as expand infrastructure access for over 8.5 million people. The IFC also remains very active in advising the Indonesian agribusiness sector, with projects impacting up to 11,000 smallholder farmers.

In December 2015, the board of the World Bank introduced a revised, sweeping strategy for Indonesia, known as the Country Partnership Framework (CPF). Its completion followed a series of extensive consultations with the Indonesian public and private sectors, as well as civil society groups. As a result, the CPF aligns with the aims of Jakarta's medium-term development plans. While the framework is implemented over the next four years, it is expected to become one of the Group's most comprehensive and far-reaching programs. In May 2015 Jim Yong Kim, offered President Joko Widodo as much as $11 billion in new loans over the following three to four years for basic infrastructure. The framework will focus particularly on Indonesia's energy and infrastructure sectors, specialty areas of the IBRD and ICF. This investment was met with speculation that the Washington-influenced World Bank is cultivating a strategy of crowding out opportunity for Chinese investment in the archipelago.

The World Bank also administers several programs to combat Indonesia's financial issues. One of these is the Generasi program, which provides incentivized block grants to communities. Generasi is present in 5,488 villages across 11 provinces, with as many as 5 million recipients. According to the World Bank, it intends to support three of the UN's Millennium Development Goals: maternal health, child health, and universal education. The Bank has also instituted the PNPM Urban program, reaching 30 million people and attempting to address the infrastructure shortage in urban slums, including roads and water supply facilities. PNPM also provided micro-credit services and training in financial management. The Indonesian government has also received substantial World Bank support in its Family Hope Program, including family development sessions and instructional materials regarding maternal health and child nutrition. 3.5 million families currently subscribe to this program, with the World Bank – Indonesia partnership intending to expand that reach to 6 million.
