= Relus ter Beek =

Dutch politician (1944–2008)

His Excellency Relus ter Beek
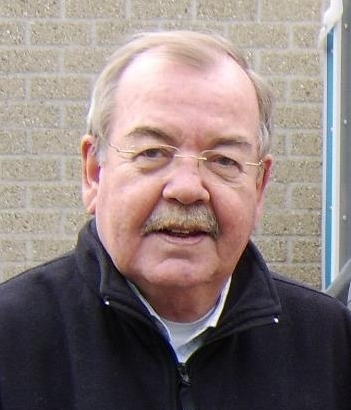
- Ter Beek in 2008

Queen's Commissioner of Drenthe
- In office 1 January 1995 – 29 September 2008
- Monarch: Beatrix
- Preceded by: Margreeth de Boer
- Succeeded by: Jacques Tichelaar

Minister of Defence
- In office 7 November 1989 – 22 August 1994
- Prime Minister: Ruud Lubbers
- Preceded by: Frits Bolkestein
- Succeeded by: Joris Voorhoeve

Member of the House of Representatives
- In office 17 May 1994 – 1 January 1995
- In office 11 May 1971 – 7 November 1989
- Parliamentary group: Labour Party

Personal details
- Born: Aurelus Louis ter Beek; 18 January 1944 Coevorden, Netherlands
- Died: 29 September 2008 (aged 64) Assen, Netherlands
- Cause of death: Lung cancer
- Party: Labour Party (from 1962)
- Spouse: Annechien Ties (m. 1969)
- Children: 1 son and 1 daughter
- Education: University of Amsterdam (Bachelor of Social Science, Master of Social Science)
- Occupation: Politician · Nonprofit director · Activist

Aurelus Louis "Relus" ter Beek (18 January 1944 – 29 September 2008) was a Dutch politician of the Labour Party (PvdA).

He served as a Member of the House of Representatives from 11 May 1971 until 7 November 1989 when he became Minister of Defence serving from 7 November 1989 until 22 August 1994 in the third Lubbers cabinet. He returned as a Member of the House of Representatives serving from 17 May 1994 until his resignation on 1 January 1995 to become the Queen's Commissioner of Drenthe, he served for thirteen years until his death on 29 September 2008 from lung cancer at the age of 64.

== Decorations ==
Honours
Ribbon bar	Honour	Country	Date	Comment
	Knight of the Order of the Netherlands Lion	Netherlands	29 April 1983	
	Commander of the Order of Orange-Nassau	Netherlands	8 October 1994	

Political offices
Preceded by Frits Bolkestein	Minister of Defence; 1989–1994	Succeeded by Joris Voorhoeve
Preceded by Margreeth de Boer	Queen's Commissioner of Drenthe; 1993–1994	Succeeded by Jacques Tichelaar
