= Hayo Apotheker =

Dutch politician

Harm Haijo Apotheker (born 5 June 1950, Loppersum) is a Dutch politician for the Democraten 66 party. He was mayor of several Dutch townships, including Leeuwarden. From 1998 to 1999 Apotheker was Minister of Agriculture in the Second Kok cabinet, but he couldn't find his way in the national political arena. He resigned in 1999 and returned to his previous role as mayor in various townships.

Apotheker became acting mayor of Sneek in 2010, which merged with other municipalities to form Súdwest-Fryslân in 2011. As mayor of this larger municipality, he blindly signed a forged multimillion-euro contract for a residential construction project in Sneek. This caused the township to pay 7 million euro more than expected. He however remained mayor until January 2018 when he became acting mayor first of Waadhoeke and then, from January 2019, of Noardeast-Fryslân. He retired from this post in January 2020.
