= List of King's and Queen's commissioners of Limburg =

King's Commissioner of Limburg
- Commissaris van de Koning van Limburg
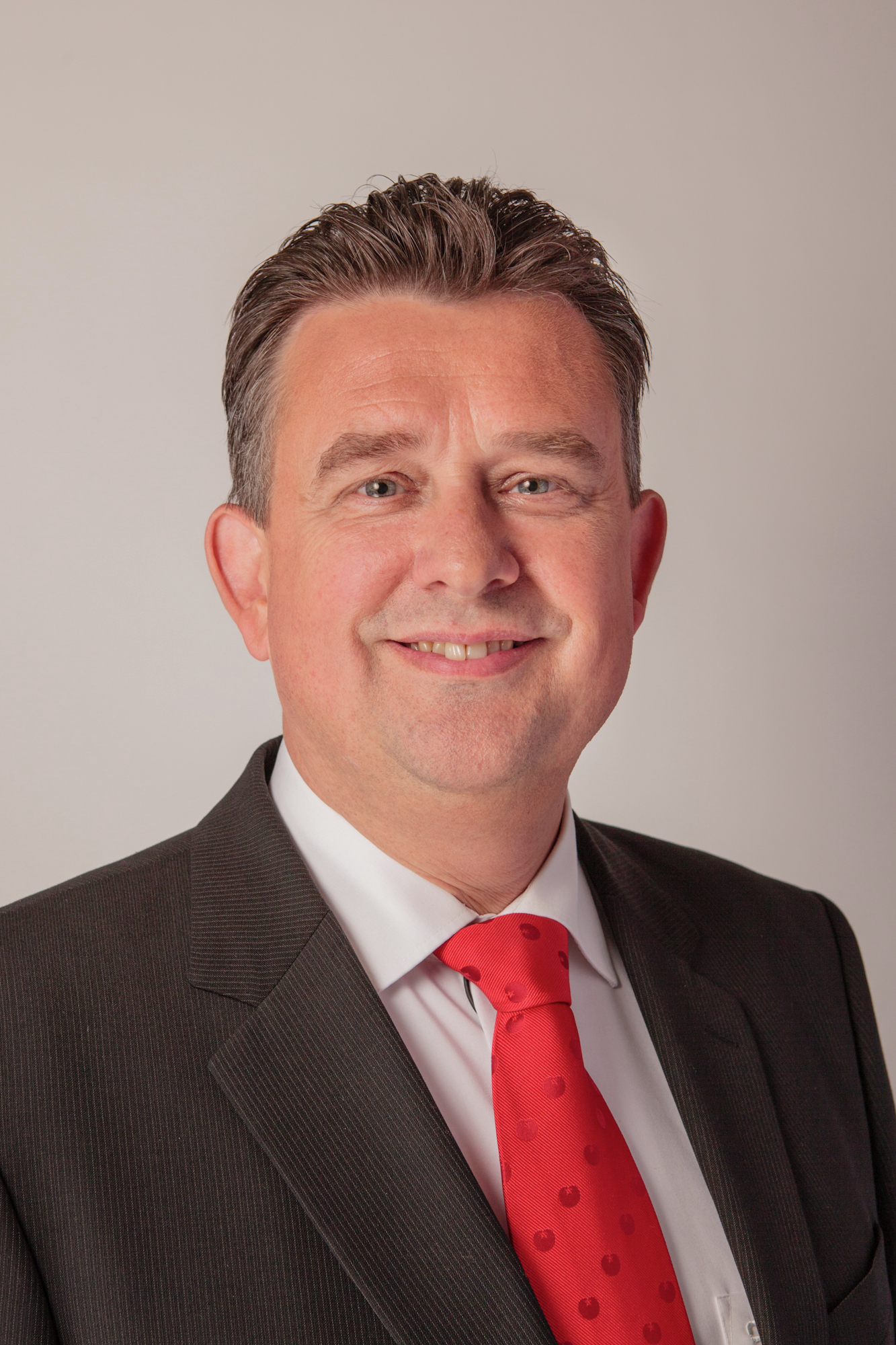
- Incumbent; Emile Roemer since 1 December 2021
- Appointer: The Crown
- Term length: Six years, no term limit
- Inaugural holder: Charles de Brouckère
- Formation: 16 September 1815

The King's Commissioner of Limburg (Dutch: Commissaris van de Koning in Limburg) is the chairman of both the States of Limburg as well as the provincial executive.

In the Dutch province of Limburg, the King's Commissioner is usually called Gouverneur (governor), as in Belgium. Similarly, the Provinciehuis (Province Hall) in Maastricht is called Gouvernement (Governor's Residence). This local custom arose from the particular status of the current province in the nineteenth century.

In 1830, the whole of the province of Limburg, which at the time consisted of both the present Dutch and Belgian parts, joined in the Belgian Revolution, with the notable exception of the city of Maastricht. From then until 1839 Limburg was governed as part of Belgium. As per the 1839 Treaty of London, The Netherlands recognised Belgium's independence, but special provisions were made for Limburg (and Luxembourg). The province was divided into two, roughly taking river Meuse as the border, with most of the eastern half, although now an integral part of the Dutch territory, becoming a member of the German Confederacy as the "Duchy of Limburg" to appease Prussia, which had lost access to the Meuse after the Congress of Vienna. This peculiar arrangement, which excluded Maastricht and Venlo, lasted until the Confederation's dissolution in 1866.

The folklore custom to call the local King's Commissioner "Governor" dates from these times; nowadays it is used to underline the Limburgers' (self-)perceived otherness from "regular" Dutchmen.

== List of King's and Queen's commissioners of Limburg ==
Term	Name	Party
1815–1828	Charles de Brouckère	Orangist
1828–1831	Maximilien Henri Ghislain, Baron de Beeckman	
1831	Pierre André Servais Kerens (ad interim)	Orangist
1831–1845	Johan Eberhard Paul Ernst Gericke van Herwijnen	
1845–1846	Pieter Daniël Eugenius Macpherson	
1846–1856	Eduardus Johannes Petrus van Meeuwen	Liberal
1856–1874	Joseph van der Does de Willebois	Moderate liberal
1874–1893	Eduard de Kuijper	
1893–1918	Gustave Ruijs de Beerenbrouck	Roman Catholic (conservative)
1918	Charles Ruijs de Beerenbrouck	General League
1918–1936	Eduard van Hövell tot Westerflier	General League / RKSP
1936–1941	Willem van Sonsbeeck	RKSP
1941–1944	Max de Marchant et d'Ansembourg	NSB
1944–1947	Willem van Sonsbeeck	RKSP / KVP
1947–1964	François Joseph Marie Anne Hubert Houben	KVP
1964–1978	Charles van Rooy	KVP
1978–1990	Sjeng Kremers	KVP, CDA
1990–1993	Emile Mastenbroek	CDA
1993–2005	Berend-Jan van Voorst tot Voorst	CDA
2005–2011	Léon Frissen	CDA
2011–2021	Theo Bovens	CDA
2021	Johan Remkes (acting)	VVD
2021–present	Emile Roemer	SP
