= Eduardus =

Eduardus is a masculine given name which may refer to:

- Duarte Lobo (c. 1565–1646), Latinized as Eduardus Lupus, Portuguese composer
- Eduardus Halim (born 1961), Indonesian-American pianist
- Eduardus Johannes Petrus van Meeuwen (1802–1873), Dutch politician
- Ed Nijpels (born 1950), Dutch retired politician
- Eduardus Sangsun (1943–2008), Indonesian Roman Catholic bishop
- Eduardus van Voorst tot Voorst (1874–1945), Dutch sport shooter
