= Limburg Province =

Limburg Province may refer to:

- Limburg (Belgium)
- Limburg (Netherlands)
- Province of Limburg (1815–1839), a former province of the United Kingdom of the Netherlands
