= Lodewijk Cornelis Josephus Andreas van Meeuwen =

Dutch politician (1844–1927)

Jonkheer Lodewijk Cornelis Josephus Andreas van Meeuwen ('s-Hertogenbosch, 1844 – 's-Hertogenbosch, 1927) was a Dutch lawyer and president of the court.

Lodewijk was a younger brother of Pieter Maria Frans van Meeuwen. He was a scion of the Catholic noble family van Meeuwen as a jonkheer. He moved to The Hague and later returned to 's-Hertogenbosch. In 1867-1873 he was a lawyer in 's-Hertogenbosch.

In 1889 Van Meeuwen was a judge of the Hoge Raad der Nederlanden. Later he was president of the Court in 's-Hertogenbosch.

Van Meeuwen's son Eduard Anton Eugène van Meeuwen followed him as president of the Court.
