= Meeuwen =

Meeuwen may refer to:

- Meeuwen, Belgium, a village in the municipality of Meeuwen-Gruitrode
- Meeuwen, Netherlands, a village in the municipality of Altena

See also

- Van Meeuwen, a Dutch noble family
