= Berend-Jan van Voorst tot Voorst =

Dutch politician and diplomat (1944–2023)

Baron Berend-Jan van Voorst tot Voorst
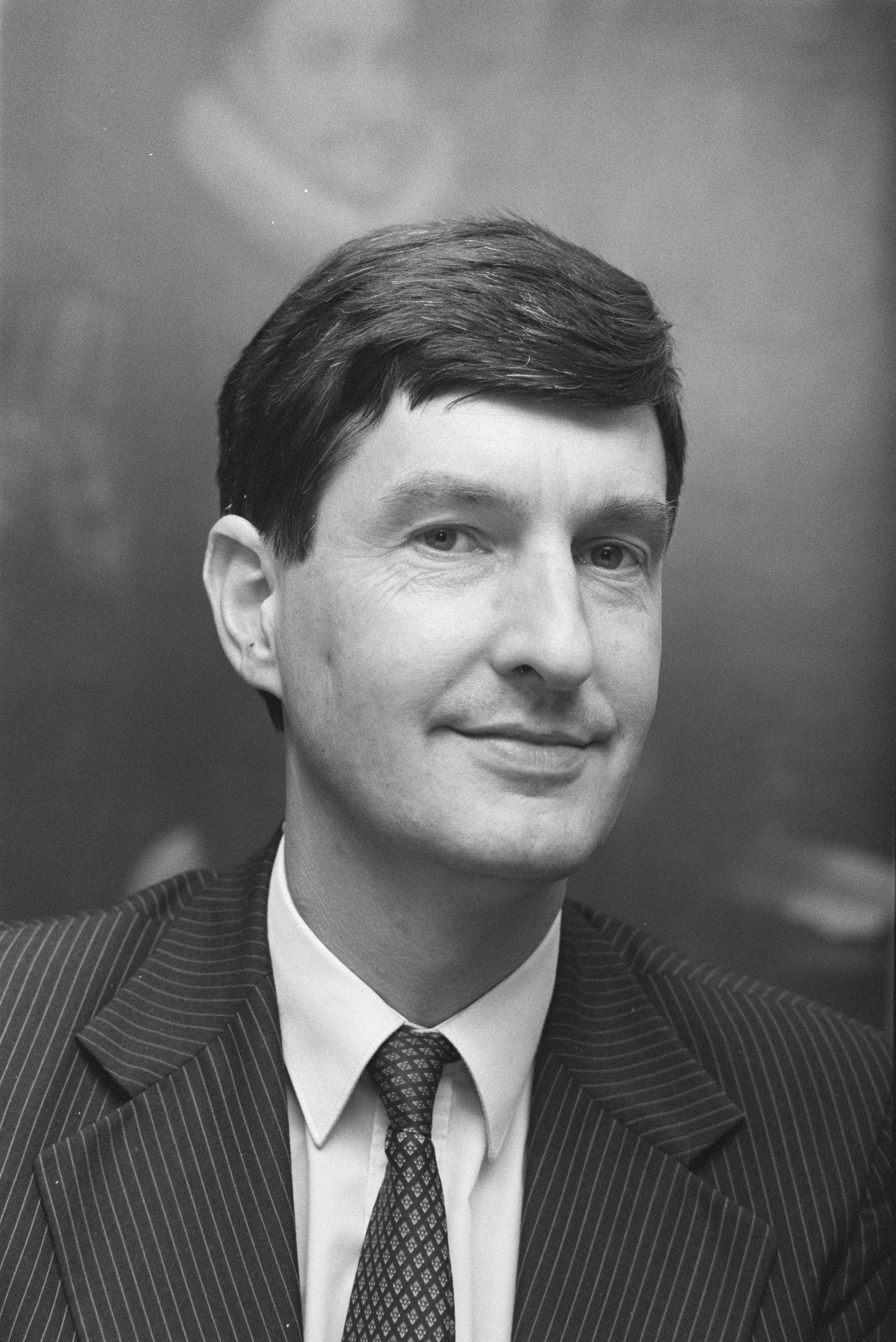
- Van Voorst tot Voorst in 1988

Queen's Commissioner of Limburg
- In office 1 July 1993 – 1 July 2005
- Monarch: Beatrix
- Preceded by: Emile Mastenbroek
- Succeeded by: Léon Frissen

State Secretary for Defence
- In office 7 November 1989 – 1 June 1993
- Prime Minister: Ruud Lubbers
- Preceded by: Jan van Houwelingen
- Succeeded by: Ton Frinking

Member of the House of Representatives
- In office 14 September 1989 – 7 November 1989
- Parliamentary group: Christian Democratic Appeal

State Secretary for Foreign Affairs
- In office 27 September 1988 – 7 November 1989
- Prime Minister: Ruud Lubbers
- Preceded by: René van der Linden
- Succeeded by: Piet Dankert

Personal details
- Born: Berend-Jan Marie van Voorst tot Voorst; 7 February 1944 Beek, German-occupied Netherlands
- Died: 6 November 2023 (aged 79)
- Party: Christian Democratic Appeal (from 1980)
- Other political affiliations: Catholic People's Party (1966–1980)
- Children: 3 daughters
- Education: Radboud University Nijmegen (Bachelor of Laws, Master of Laws); University of Fribourg (Bachelor of Social Science, Master of Social Science)
- Occupation: Politician · Diplomat · Civil servant · Jurist · Businessman · Corporate director · Nonprofit director

Baron Berend-Jan Marie van Voorst tot Voorst (7 February 1944 – 6 November 2023) was a Dutch politician and diplomat of the Christian Democratic Appeal (CDA) party and jurist.

Van Voorst tot Voorst worked as a civil servant for the Ministry of Foreign Affairs from July 1968 until September 1972 and as a diplomat for the Directorate-General for External Relations of the European Commission in Brussels from September 1972 until May 1985. Van Voorst tot Voorst worked as a civil servant for the Ministry of Economic Affairs as Director-General of the department for Foreign Trade from May 1985 until September 1988. Van Voorst tot Voorst was appointed State Secretary for Foreign Affairs in the Cabinet Lubbers II following the resignation of René van der Linden, taking office on 27 September 1988. Van Voorst tot Voorst was elected as a Member of the House of Representatives after the election of 1989, taking office on 14 September 1989. Following the cabinet formation of 1989 Van Voorst tot Voorst was appointed State Secretary for Defence in the Cabinet Lubbers III, taking office on 7 November 1989.

In June 1993 Van Voorst tot Voorst was nominated as Queen's Commissioner of Limburg, he resigned as a State Secretary on 1 June 1993 and was installed as Queen's Commissioner, serving from 1 July 1993 until 1 July 2005.

== Personal life ==
Berend-Jan van Voorst tot Voorst had his secondary education in Tilburg and studied law at the Catholic University of Nijmegen and politics as well as science at the University of Fribourg, Switzerland.

Van Voorst tot Voorst was married and had three daughters. He died on 6 November 2023, at the age of 79.

== Decorations ==
Honours
Ribbon bar	Honour	Country	Date	Comment
	Commander of the Order of Leopold II	Belgium	15 May 1989	
	Commander of the Order of Orange-Nassau	Netherlands	25 June 1993	
	Knight Commander of the Order of the Holy Sepulchre	Holy See	16 April 1996	Elevated from Knight (19 July 1989)
	Grand Officer of the Order of the Oak Crown	Luxembourg	12 December 1996	
	Knight Commander of the Order of St. Gregory the Great	Holy See	18 September 1998	
	Grand Cross of the Order pro Merito Melitensi	Sovereign Military Order of Malta	1 January 2002	
	Knight of the Order of the Netherlands Lion	Netherlands	1 July 2005	
	Commander of the Legion of Honour	France	25 November 2005	

Political offices
Preceded by René van der Linden	State Secretary for Foreign Affairs; 1988–1989	Succeeded by Piet Dankert
Preceded by Jan van Houwelingen	State Secretary for Defence; 1989–1993	Succeeded by Ton Frinking
Preceded by Emile Mastenbroek	Queen's Commissioner of Limburg; 1993–2005	Succeeded by Leon Frissen
