= Van Meeuwen =

van Meeuwen
- family
- Country: Netherlands
- Founded: 17th century
- Founder: Jan Jansz van Meeuwen

Van Meeuwen is a Dutch noble family.

== History ==
Jan Jansz van Meeuwen, the first recorded member of the family lived in the 17th century at Megen, was a coppersmith and pan repairman. Later, the family moved to Oss, and subsequently also became part of the political elite of 's-Hertogenbosch and The Hague. Many members were bankers, politician, civil servants, lawyers, chief executive officers and diplomats. Some were officers of the Dutch army, members of the House of Representatives and Senate of the Netherlands. The family has belonged to the lower Dutch nobility, with the honorific of jonkheer, since 1834. Since the 19th century, the family have owned the 80 hectare estate of Eikenburg which is located to the south of Rosmalen, North Brabant.

== Notable members ==
- Petrus Andreas van Meeuwen (1772–1848)
- Eduardus Johannes Petrus van Meeuwen (1802–1873)
- Pieter Maria Frans van Meeuwen (1837–1913)
- Lodewijk Cornelis Josephus Andreas van Meeuwen (1844–1918)
- Pieter Leon van Meeuwen (1870–1921)
- Eduard Anton Eugène van Meeuwen (1876–1946)
- Pieter Godfried Maria van Meeuwen (1899–1982)

== Coat of arms ==
Three silver gulls in black, red lacquered and planted in a silver shield with three red roses on their heads. Crown (the shield): A smooth silver band of five pearls and a pearl necklace, with two windings of four pearls each. Shield held by two red-tongued black eagles with backward-looking wings lifted downward. Arms placed on a green arabesque.

== See also ==
- Eikenburg
