= Province of Limburg (1815–1839) =

Province of the United Kingdom of the Netherlands (1815-30) and of Belgium (1830-39)

Province of Limburg Provincie Limburg (Dutch) Province de Limbourg (French)
- Province of the Netherlands (1815–1830); Belgium (1830–1839)
- 1815–1839
- Coat of arms

- The United Kingdom of the Netherlands with the Province of Limburg in greyish green
- Capital: Maastricht
- Government
- Governor
  - 1815–1828: Charles de Brouckère
  - 1828–1831: Maximilien de Beeckman
- Legislature: States of Limburg
- History
  - Established: 1815
  - Treaty of London: 19 April 1839
Preceded by	Succeeded by
Meuse-Inférieure; Roer (department)	Duchy of Limburg; Limburg

Limburg (Dutch: Provincie Limburg, French: Province de Limbourg) was one of the provinces of the United Kingdom of the Netherlands and later Belgium. The province existed for the duration of the United Kingdom, from 1815 to 1830, and for the first years after Belgian independence, from 1830 to 1839. When King William I signed the Treaty of London in 1839, the province was split into a Belgian part and a Dutch part, the latter being a new Duchy of Limburg.

== Geography ==
The territory of Limburg was the same as the combined territories of the present Dutch and Belgian provinces, with the exception of Voeren, which was a part of Liège Province at the time. Its capital was Maastricht.

For legal matters, the province was subdivided into the arrondissements of Maastricht, Hasselt and Roermond.

== Demographics ==
In 1830, some 338,000 people lived in this province and in 1846, about 186,000 people were counted in the new, smaller province of Belgian Limburg.

Their main religion was, and still is, Roman Catholicism.

== History ==
Following the Napoleonic Era, the great powers, United Kingdom, Prussia, the Austrian Empire, the Russian Empire and France, created a new United Kingdom of the Netherlands in 1815. A new province was formed from the former French Empire département of Meuse-Inférieure, excluding Niederkrüchten and Herzogenrath which were assigned to Prussia, and was to receive the name "Maastricht", after its capital. The first king, William I, who did not want the name of the former Duchy of Limburg to be lost, insisted that the name be changed to "Limburg". As such, the name of the new province derived from the old duchy that had existed until 1795 within the triangle of Maastricht, Liège, and Aachen.

== Dissolution ==
At the start of the Belgian Revolution of 1830, General Daine, the commander of the provincial armed forces of Limburg, situated in Maastricht, chose the side of the Belgian rebels. He left the city on 7 November 1830. He arrived at Roermond on 9 November and at Venlo on 11 November. Both cities welcomed him with open arms and sided with the rebellion. However, Maastricht was back under control by loyalist forces under the command of Colonel Dibbets.

Although most of the province, including the fortress city of Venlo, at the time Belgium's northernmost fortress, was under Belgian control following Belgium's de facto independence after French intervention, the city of Maastricht remained in Dutch hands.

In 1839, King William I recognised the independence of Belgium by signing the Treaty of London. Under the terms of the treaty, the Belgians had to relinquish the eastern part of Limburg to the Netherlands.

== See also ==
- Duchy of Limburg (1839–1867)
