= Duchy of Limburg (1839–1867) =

Constitutional monarchy in Western Europe

Coordinates: 50°37′N 5°56′E

Duchy of Limburg Hertogdom Limburg (Dutch)
- 1839–1867
- Flag Coat of arms

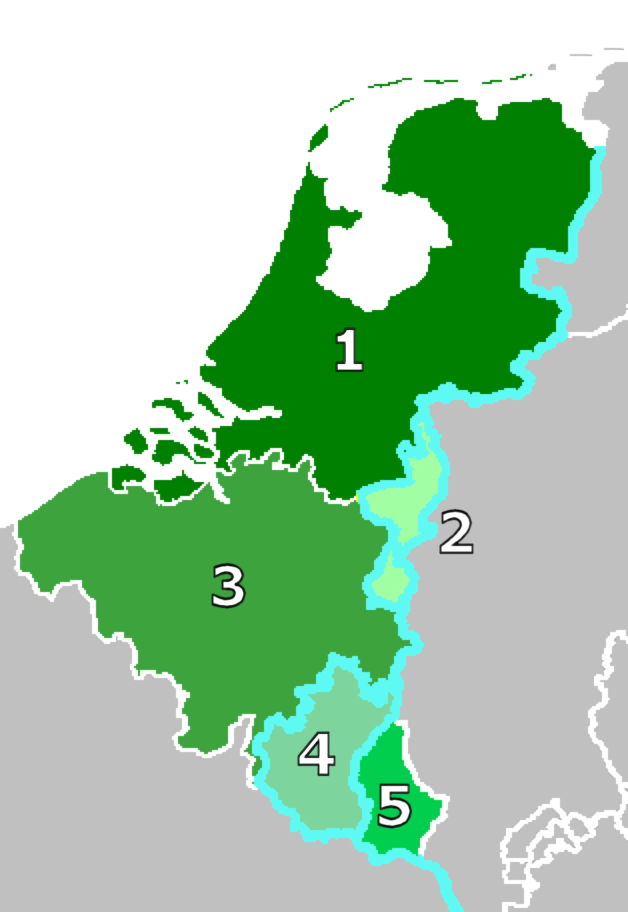
- The Exchange of 1839. The removal of Western Luxembourg (4) from the German customs union by Belgium (3) resulted in compensation by the Netherlands (1) by the creation of the Duchy of Limburg (2) (this territory was controlled by Belgium until 1839).
- Status: State of the German Confederation under the Dutch King
- Capital: Maastricht
- Common languages: Dutch, Limburgish (unofficial)
- Religion: Roman Catholic
- Government: Constitutional monarchy
- Duke
  - 1839–1840: William I
  - 1840–1849: William II
  - 1849–1866: William III
- History
  - Treaty of London: 19 April 1839
  - Treaty of London: 11 May 1867
| Preceded by | Succeeded by |
| Province of Limburg | Limburg (Netherlands) |

The Duchy of Limburg (Dutch: Hertogdom Limburg) was created in 1839 from parts of the Dutch Province of Limburg as a result of the Treaty of London. Its territory was the territory of the modern day province of Limburg with the exceptions of the cities of Maastricht and Venlo. The Duchy of Limburg was also a member state of the German Confederation.

== History ==
=== Establishment ===
The German Confederation, as established by the Congress of Vienna in 1815, was a loose association of 39 German states to coordinate the military and economies of the member countries. Though not a part of the German Confederation at its founding, Limburg would join it in 1839 as a consequence of the Belgian Revolution. In 1830 several francophone, Catholic and liberal groups joined forces and proclaimed the independence of Belgium, whose territory prior to that had been part of the United Kingdom of the Netherlands.

In the subsequent peace settlement in 1839, the Dutch king ceded the western half of the Grand Duchy of Luxembourg to the newly formed Belgian state. Luxembourg, however, had been a member state of the German Confederation since the latter's creation and with the annexation of its western parts lost approximately 150,000 inhabitants. The German Confederation insisted the common market of the customs union would be compensated by the Netherlands elsewhere; the Dutch thus created the Duchy of Limburg (consisting of the Province of Limburg minus its two major cities, Maastricht and Venlo, so as to not exceed the 150,000 number).

=== Dissolution and aftermath ===
The Seven Weeks' War between Austria and Prussia in 1866 led to the collapse of the German Confederation. To clarify the position of the Grand Duchy of Luxembourg and the Duchy of Limburg, which were possessions of the Dutch king but also member states of the Confederation, the Second Treaty of London in 1867 affirmed that Limburg was an "integral part of the Kingdom of the Netherlands", while Luxembourg was and had been an independent state in personal union with the Kingdom of the Netherlands since 1839.

The style "Duchy of Limburg" continued to be used in some official capacities until February 1907. An idiosyncrasy that survives to this day is that the King's Commissioner for the province is still informally addressed as "Governor" in Limburg, although his formal style does not differ from that used in other provinces.

== See also ==
- Province of Limburg (1815–1839)
