= Eduard Anton Eugène van Meeuwen =

Jonkheer Eduard Anton Eugène van Meeuwen (1876 – 1946) was a Dutch lawyer and vice-president of the Court of 's-Hertogenbosch.

Eduard van Meeuwen, son of jhr. Lodewijk Cornelis Josephus Andreas van Meeuwen and scion of the catholic noble family Van Meeuwen (titled as a jonkheer), studied law at Leiden University. In 1902 he complete a Juris Doctor degree at Utrecht University.

He was a lawyer in 's-Hertogenbosch. Between 1930 and 1944 he was a judge and vice-president of the Court of 's-Hertogenbosch. In 1935, he was criticized by Van Haastert for not disqualifying himself from a case involving his first wife's uncle's right to hunt.

Eduard van Meeuwen was born and died in 's-Hertogenbosch.

== Bibliography ==
- 1902: Het domicilie naar het Burgerlijk Wetboek (dissertation, published by P. Den Boer)
