= Pieter Daniël Eugenius MacPherson =

Dutch member of the civil service, politician and King's Commissioner

Pieter Daniël Eugenius MacPherson (Armentières (France), 4 April 1792 - Maastricht, 19 January 1846) was a Dutch member of the civil service, politician and King's commissioner.

MacPherson was a civil servant who rose in rank from 1816. In 1845 he was created King's Commissioner (titled 'governor') of the southern Dutch province of Limburg, however he became ill after having served only one month in office.

MacPherson married Rose Marie Jeanne van Meeuwen, a member of the Catholic noble family Van Meeuwen.

The couple's Neoclassical grave monuments, found in the Tongerseweg Cemetery in Maastricht, are National Heritage Monuments (rijksmonumenten).
