= Meuse-Inférieure =

Department of the French First Republic and Empire

Department of Meuse-Inférieure Département de la Meuse-Inférieure (French) Departement Beneden-Maas (Dutch) Departement der Unteren-Maas (German)
- 1795–1814
- Location of Meuse-Inférieure in France (1812)
- Status: Department of the French First Republic and the French First Empire
- Chef-lieu: Maastricht; 51°0′N 5°35′E
- Official languages: French
- History
  - Creation: 1 October 1795
  - Treaty of Paris, disestablished: 30 May 1814

Population
  - 1814: 267,249
Preceded by
Duchy of Limburg
Prince-Bishopric of Liège
Staats-Oppergelre
Staats-Overmaas
Succeeded by
Province of Limburg
- Today part of: Belgium; Germany; Netherlands

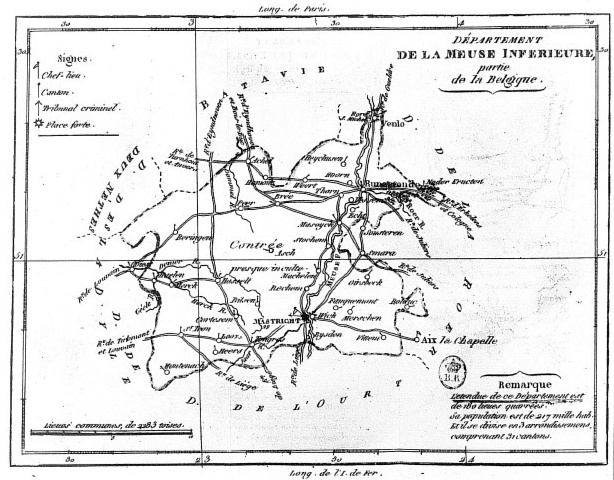
Map of the former Meuse-Inférieure département.

Meuse-Inférieure (French: [møz ɛ̃feʁjœʁ]; Dutch: Beneden-Maas; German: Unteren-Maas; "Lower Meuse") was a department of the French First Republic and French First Empire in present-day Belgium, Netherlands and Germany. It was named after the river Meuse. Its territory corresponded largely with the present-day provinces of Belgian and Dutch Limburg. It was created on 1 October 1795, when the Austrian Netherlands and the Prince-Bishopric of Liège were officially annexed by the French Republic. Before this annexation, its territory was part of the County of Loon, the Austrian Upper Guelders, the Staats-Oppergelre, the County of Horne, the Abbacy of Thorn, Maastricht and part of the Lands of Overmaas. The original medieval Duchy of Limburg were associated with the Lands of Overmaas, lying to their south. The two regions had long been governed together and referred to collectively with both names, but the original Duchy lands were not part of this new entity.

Meuse-Inférieure within the northern French Empire (1811)

The Chef-lieu of the department was Maastricht. The department was subdivided into the following three arrondissements and cantons:

- Maastricht: Bilzen, Galoppe, Heerlen, Malines-sur-Meuse, Maastricht (2 cantons), Meerssen, Oirsbeek, Rolduc and Tongres.
- Hasselt: Béringue, Looz, Hasselt, Herck-la-Ville, Peer and Saint-Trond.
- Roermond: Achel, Brée, Maaseik, Niederkrüchten, Ruremonde, Venlo and Weert.

After Napoleon was defeated in 1814, the department (excluding Niederkrüchten and Herzogenrath which were assigned to the Kingdom of Prussia and are located in the present-day state of North Rhine-Westphalia) became part of the United Kingdom of the Netherlands, as the Province of Limburg (with a part of the Roer département).

In subsequent events starting in 1830, a part of this Kingdom split out to become Belgium. By 1839 it was settled that the Hasselt canton of Limburg, plus significant parts of the other two, went into Belgium, while the rest remained in the Netherlands. Both provinces have kept the name Limburg.

== Administration ==
=== Prefects ===
The Prefect was the highest state representative in the department.

Term start	Term end	Office holder
29 March 1800	2 November 1801	François Becays Ferrand dit Ferrand de Lacaussade
2 November 1801	31 January 1806	Pierre Loysel
31 January 1806	30 May 1814	Jean-Baptiste Roggieri

=== Secretaries-General ===
The Secretary-General was the deputy to the Prefect.

Term start	Term end	Office holder
2 March 1800	30 May 1814	M.J. Reintjens

=== Subprefects of Hasselt ===
Term start	Term end	Office holder
17 April 1800	13 October 1813	Jean Baptiste Bertrand Arnoul
13 October 1813	21 November 1813	Briche
21 November 1813	6 January 1814	Billig
6 January 1814	30 May 1814	Baumes

=== Subprefects of Maastricht ===
The office of Subprefect of Maastricht was held by the Prefect until 1811.

Term start	Term end	Office holder
11 January 1811	30 May 1814	Van den Rhoër

=== Subprefects of Roermond ===
Term start	Term end	Office holder
17 April 1800	3 May 1801	Magniet
3 May 1801	24 July 1811	Liger
24 July 1811	30 May 1814	Brandes
