= Eikenburg =

Estate land, North Brabant, Netherlands South

Coordinates: 51.7092°N 5.39556°E

Eikenburg is an estate in the southern Netherlands, in the south of Rosmalen, North Brabant. The area of the estate is 80 ha.

Since the 19th century the owner of this estate has been the noble family Van Meeuwen.
