= Pieter Leon van Meeuwen =

Jonkheer Pieter Leon van Meeuwen (16 August 1870, 's-Hertogenbosch – 6 July 1921, The Hague) was a Dutch jurist and president of the Court in The Hague.

Jhr. van Meeuwen is a son of jhr. Pieter Maria Frans van Meeuwen and Elisabeth Julienne Magnée. He was married with Maria Francisca van Lanschot. Van Meeuwen studied law in Leiden. From 1896 to 1902 he was a lawyer in 's-Hertogenbosch, between 1902 and 1904 he was employed at the Openbaar Ministerie in 's-Hertogenbosch and Eindhoven. He was from 1904 to 1907 judge in Almelo and The Hague (1907–1914). In 1914 was he vicepresident of the Hoge Raad der Nederlanden. At 23 November 1918 he became president of the Court in The Hague.
