= Charles de Steuben =

German-born French painter (1788–1856)

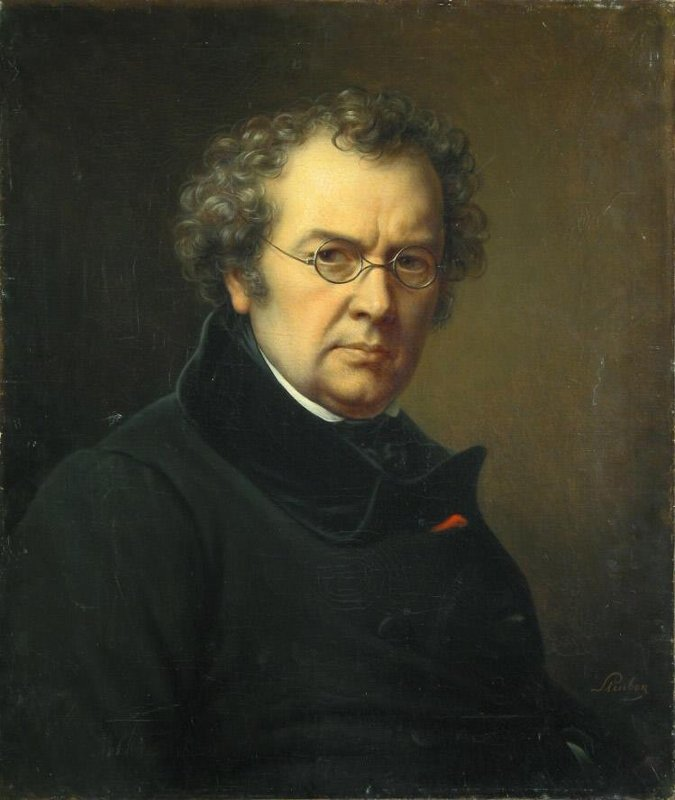
- Self-portrait, 1840–1845
- Born: Carl August Wilhelm von Steuben; 18 April 1788; Bauerbach, Saxe-Meiningen
- Died: 21 November 1856 (aged 68); Paris, France
- Resting place: Père Lachaise Cemetery
- Occupations: Painter; lithographer

Charles Auguste Guillaume Steuben (German: Carl August Wilhelm von Steuben; April 18, 1788 – November 21, 1856), also Charles de Steuben, was a German-born French Romantic painter and lithographer active from the Napoleonic to Second Empire eras.

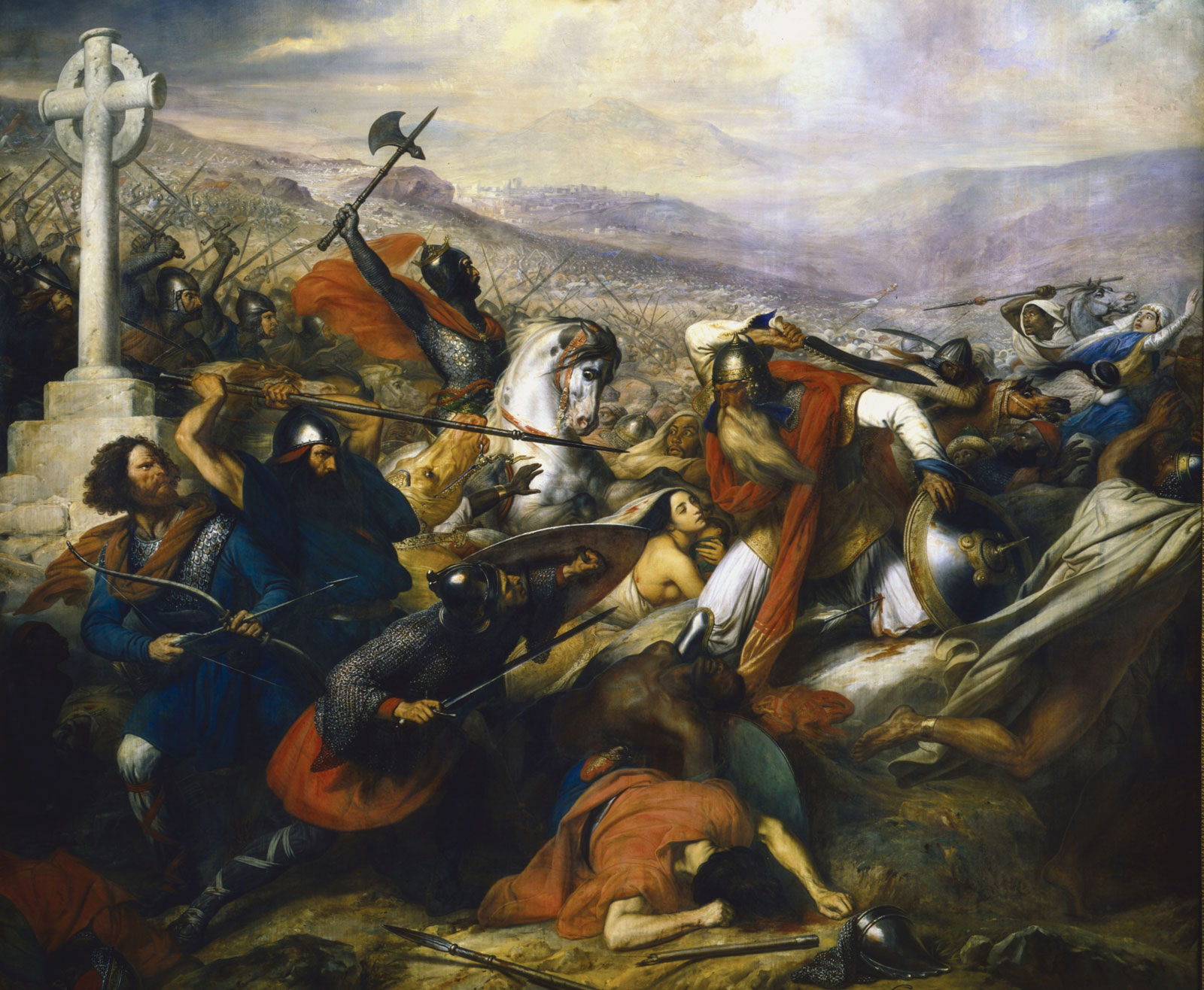
The Battle of Tours, 1839

== Early life ==
De Steuben was born the son of the Duke of Württemberg officer Carl Hans Ernst von Steuben. At the age of twelve he moved with his father, who entered Russian service as a captain, to Saint Petersburg, where he studied drawing at the Imperial Academy of Arts as a guest student.

Thanks to his father's social contacts in the court of the Tsar, in the summer of 1802 he accompanied the young Grand Duchess Maria Pavlovna of Russia (1786–1859) and granddaughter of Frederick II Eugene, Duke of Württemberg, to the Thuringian cultural city of Weimar, where the Tsar's daughter two years later married Charles Frederick, Grand Duke of Saxe-Weimar-Eisenach (1783–1853). Steuben, then fourteen years old, was a page at the ducal court, a position for which the career prospects would be in the military or administration.

The poet Friedrich Schiller was a family friend who at once recognized De Steuben's artistic talent and instilled in him his political ideal of free self-determination regardless of courtly constraints.

== Education and training ==
In 1803 Steuben traveled with a letter to his friend, painter François Gérard, in Paris. Gerard took in many penniless aspiring artists and students for training. After two years of preparation, in February 1805 Steuben enrolled in the prestigious École nationale supérieure des Beaux-Arts, where he learned from renowned teachers, including Jacques-Louis David and Pierre-Paul Prud'hon.

While working in a studio, the young art student first met the naturalist Alexander von Humboldt, whose brother Wilhelm von Humboldt was the founder of the University of Berlin. Alexander von Humboldt strongly encouraged the efforts of the Steuben family to establish themselves artistically and economically: in long letters Humboldt repeatedly asked for support for De Steuben, soliciting artistic jobs for him, including from the Prussian Minister Heinrich Friedrich Karl vom und zum Stein and Duchess Helene of Mecklenburg-Schwerin.

== Career and travels ==
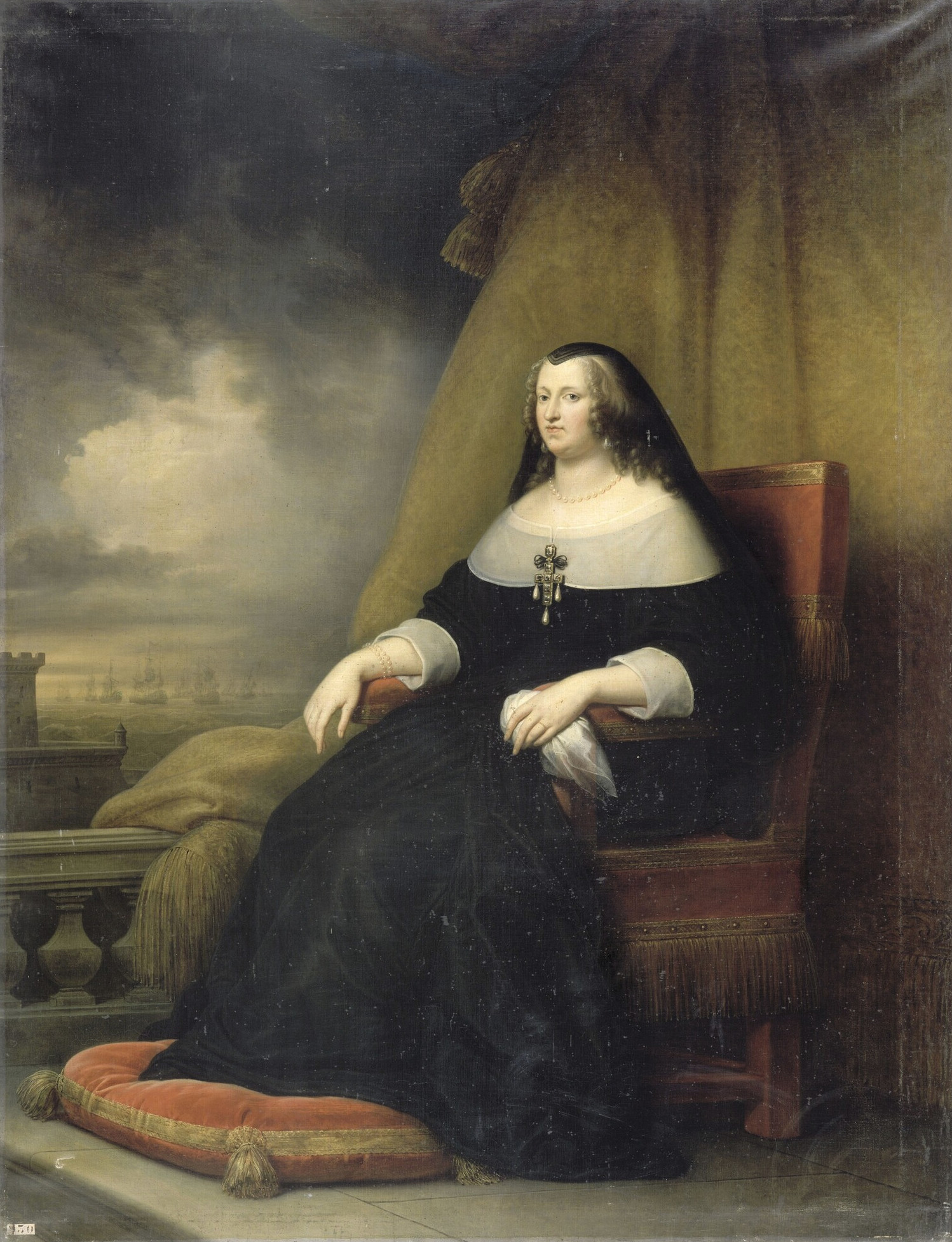
Anne of Austria, Queen of France, c. 1836–1838

De Steuben in 1812 debuted at the Salon de Paris with his painting of Peter the Great in the storm on Lake Ladoga, which garnered attention in the professional world. Encouraged by this first success, Steuben continued with a number of historical paintings. In 1820 he married a portrait painter named Eleanor Trollé, whom he had met during his training. At the time of their wedding, the couple already had a son, Joseph Alexander (born 1814).

At the behest of Pierre Fontaine in 1828 de Steuben painted La Clémence de Henri IV après la Bataille d'Ivry, depicting a victorious Henry IV of France at the Battle of Ivry. De Steuben's Bataille de Poitiers, en octobre 732, painted between 1834 and 1837, shows the triumphant Charles Martel at the Battle of Tours, also known as the Battle of Poitiers. He painted Jeanne la folle around the same time and he was commissioned by Louis Philippe to paint a series of portraits of past Kings of France.

Life in the French capital was a repeated source of internal conflict for Steuben. The allure of bohemian Paris and his military-dominated upbringing made him a wanderer between worlds. As an official commitment to his adopted country he became a French citizen in 1823. However, the irregularity of his income as a freelance artist was in contrast to his sense of duty and social responsibility. To secure his family financially, he took a job as an art teacher at the École Polytechnique, where he briefly trained Gustave Courbet.

In 1840 he was awarded a gold medal at the Salon de Paris for his highly acclaimed paintings.

== Later years ==
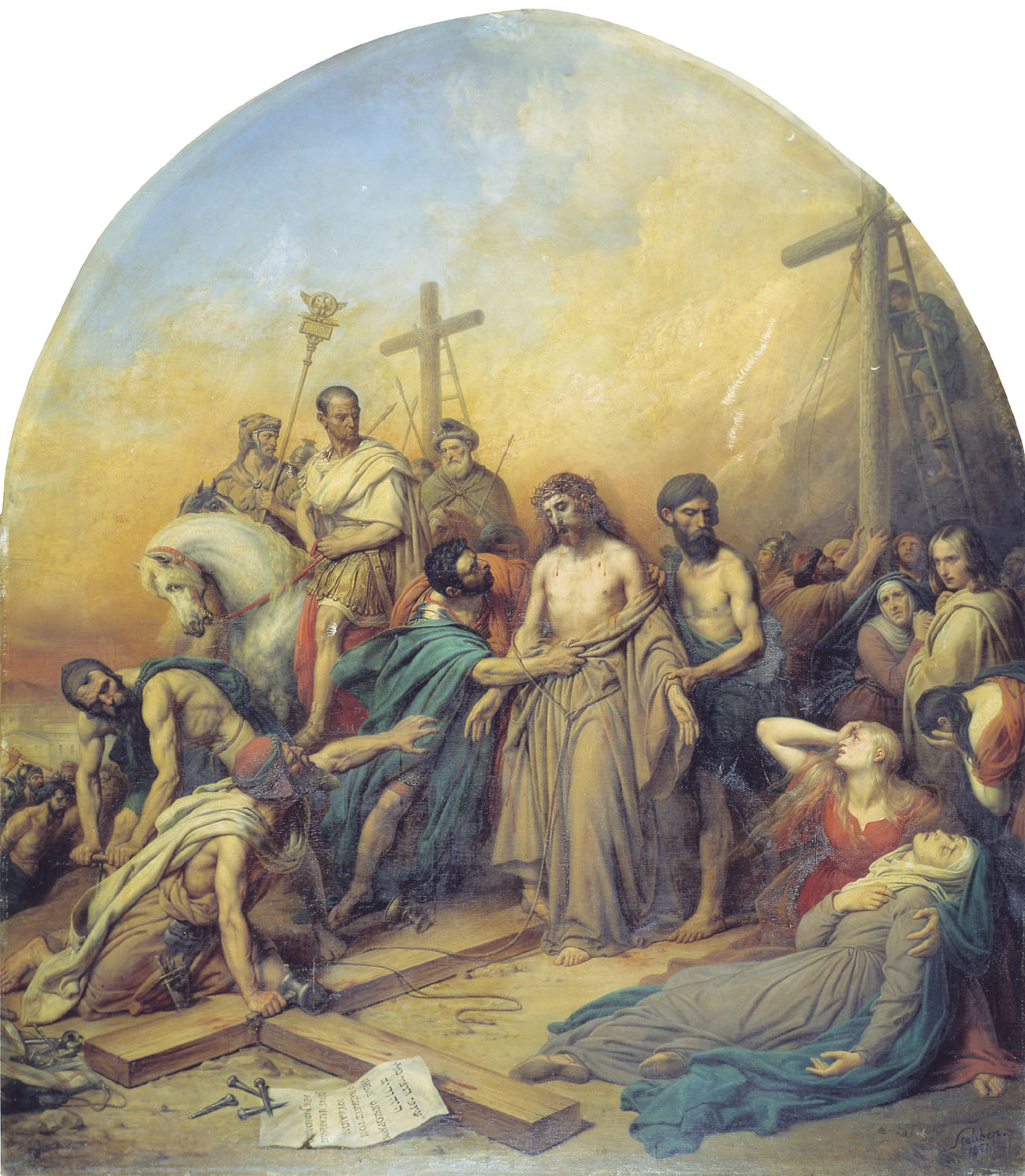
Jesus Led by the Executioners to his Crucifixion, 1841

In 1843 Steuben went back to Russia for 11 years. In Saint Petersburg he created seven paintings for the Saint Isaac's Cathedral. After a stroke, the artist returned to Paris in 1854, a sick man, where he suffered two more strokes, and ultimately lost the ability to work. De Steuben died in 1856 at the age of 68 years in his adopted hometown of Paris; he's interred into the Père Lachaise Cemetery.

Steuben's son Joseph Alexander was taught painting by his father, and used his parents' close ties to the Russian art scene. After studying in Paris and a two-year residency in Rome, Joseph went to Saint Petersburg like his father, where he was commissioned by Tsar Nicholas I, and also produced paintings for Saint Isaac's Cathedral.

== Style ==
The love of classical painting was a lifelong passion of Steuben. He was a close friend to Eugène Delacroix, the leader of the French Romantic school of painting, whom he portrayed several times. Steuben was also part of this artistic movement, which replaced classicism in French painting. "The painter of the Revolution," as Jacques-Louis David was called by his students, joined art with politics in his works. The subjects of his historical paintings supported historical change. He painted mainly in sharp color contrasts, heavy solid contours and clear outlines. The severity of this style led many contemporary artists - including Prud'hon - to a romanticized counter movement. They preferred the shadowy softness and gentle color gradations of Italian Renaissance painters such as Leonardo da Vinci and Antonio da Correggio, whose works they studied intensively. Also, Steuben, who had begun his training with David, felt the school was becoming increasingly rigid and dogmatic. Critics praise his deliberate compositions, excellent brush stroke and impressive color effects. But his pursuit of dramatic design of rich people also showed, at times, a pronounced tendency toward the histrionic.

== Gallery ==
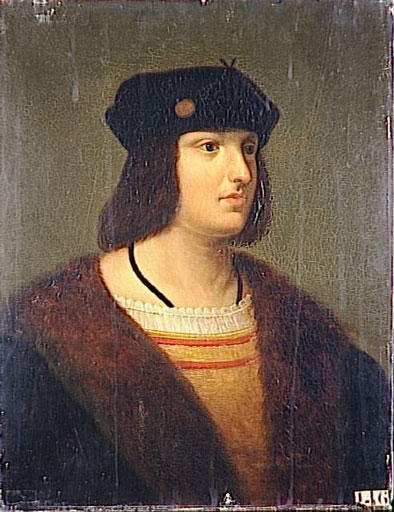
Louis d'Armagnac, duc de Nemours (1472–1503)

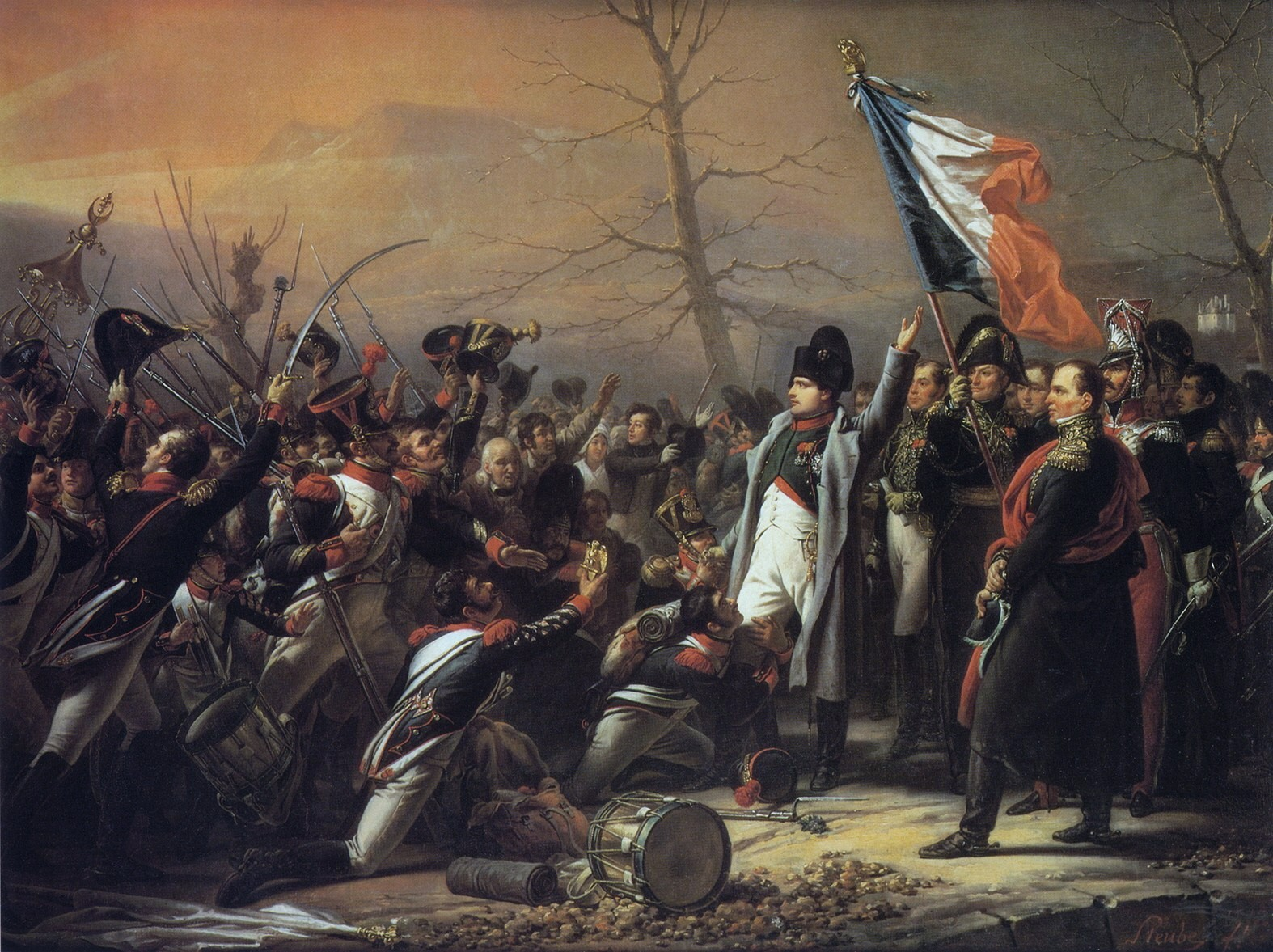
Napoleon's Return from Elba, 1818

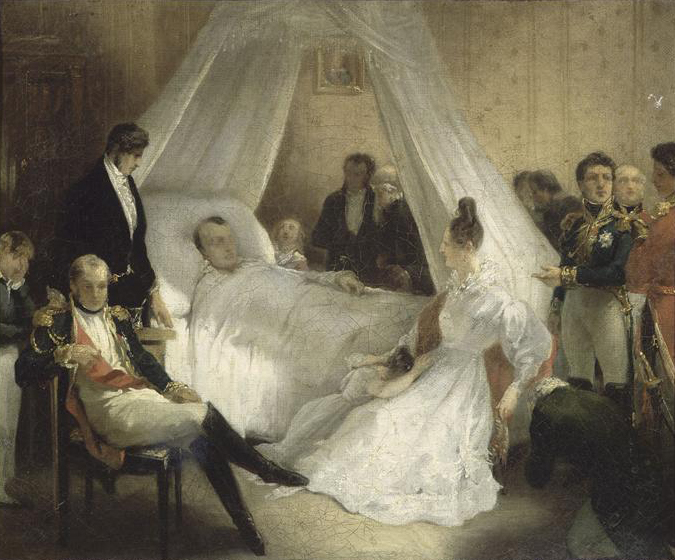
Napolean's death, 1828

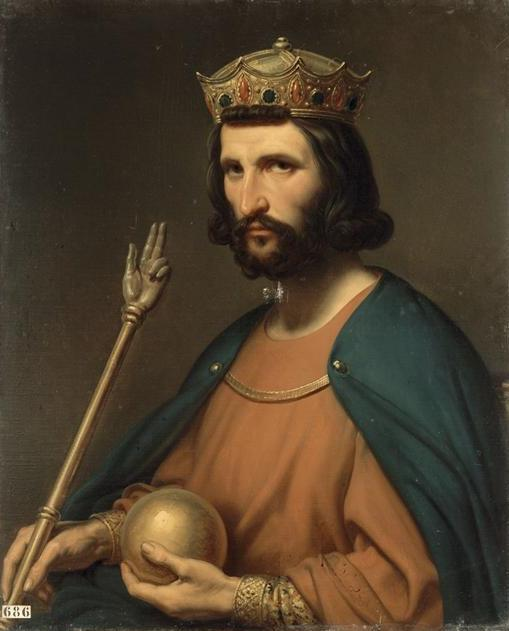
Hughes Capet, 1837

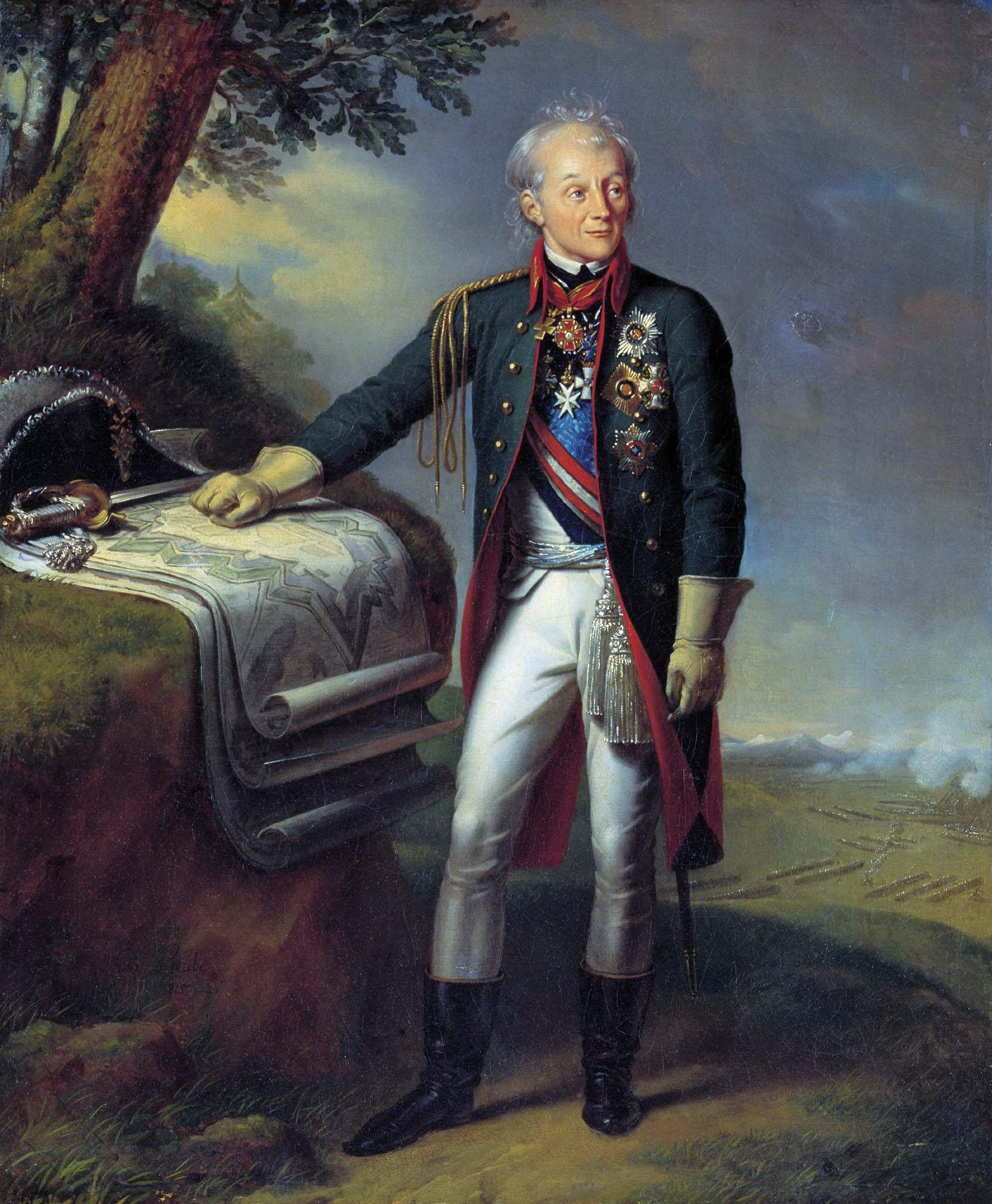
Alexander Suvorov (1730–1800), 1815

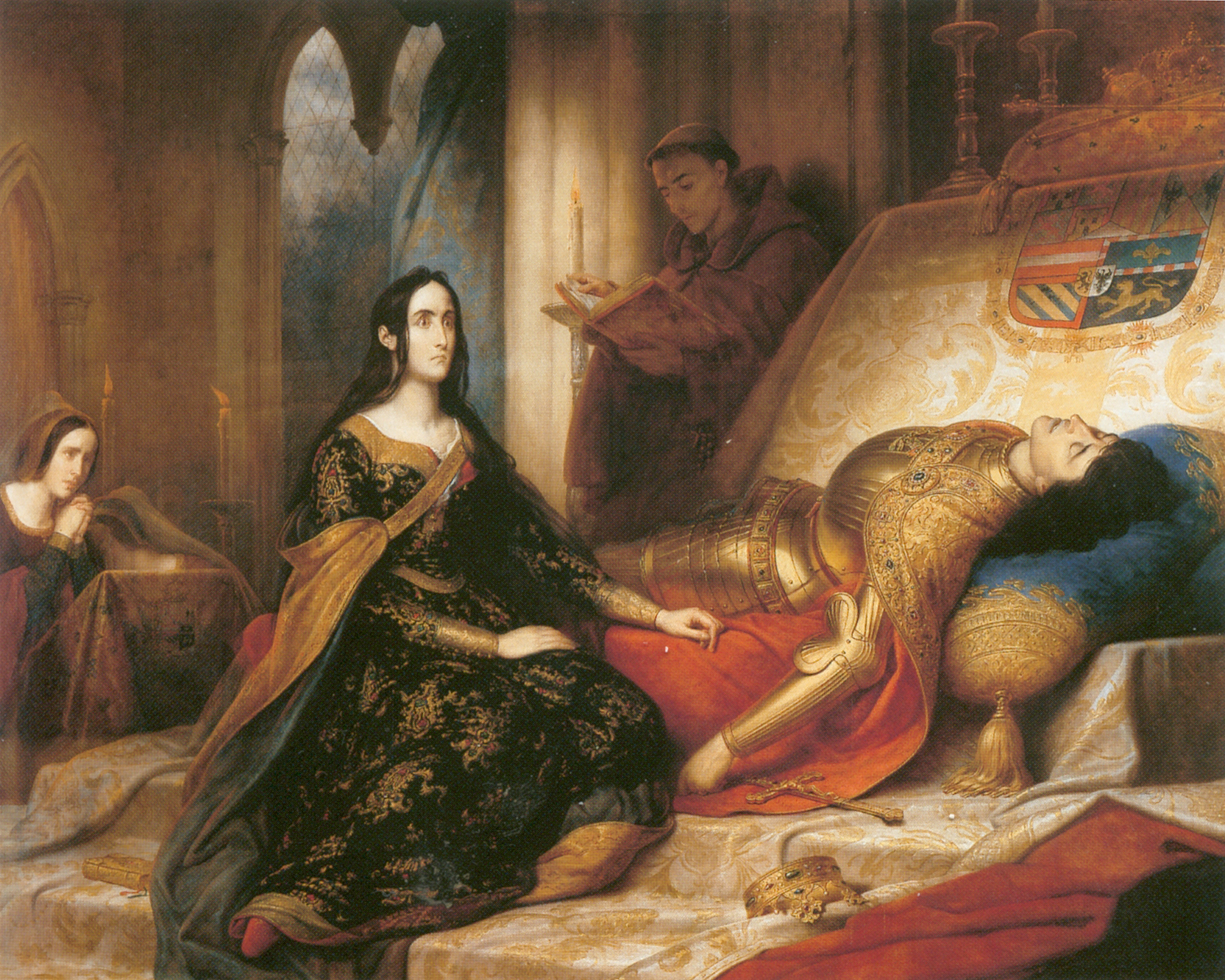
Jeanne la Folle, 1836

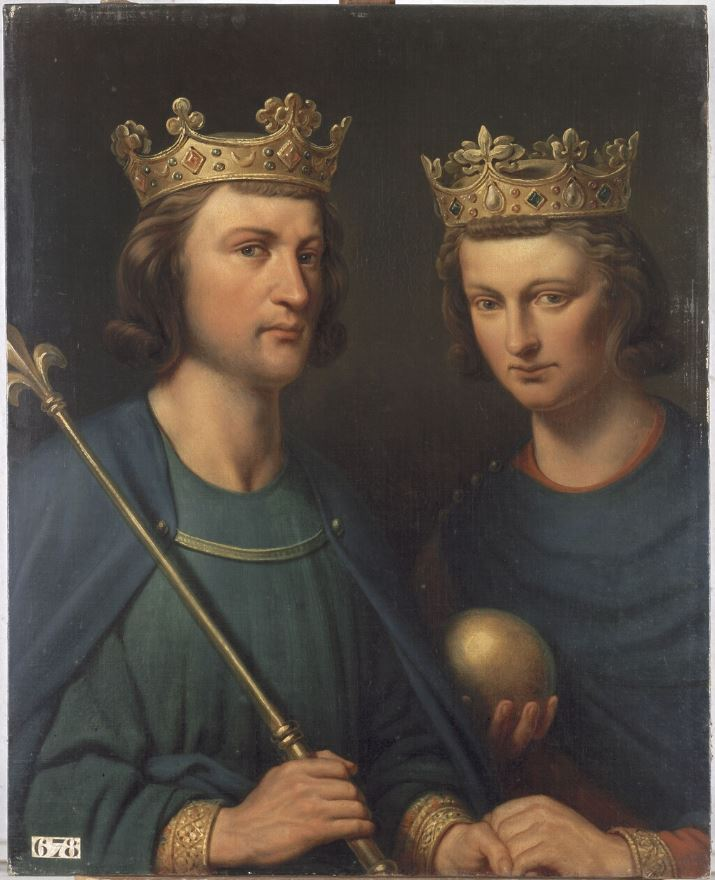
Louis III and Carloman, kings of France

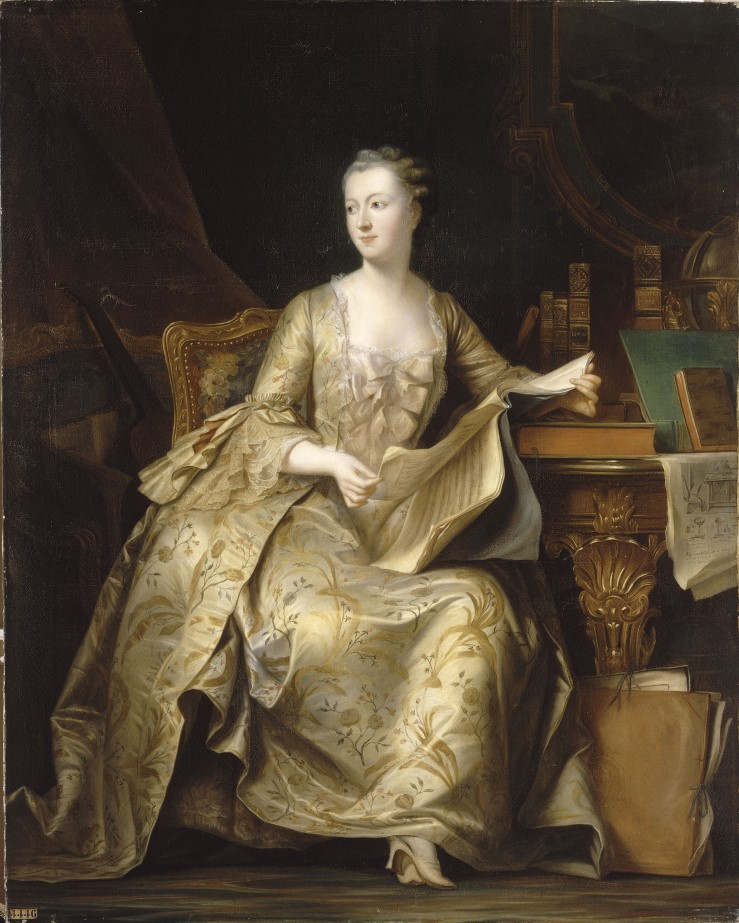
Madame de Pompadour, after Maurice Quentin de La Tour, 1838-1848
