= Theo Bovens =

Dutch politician (born 1959)

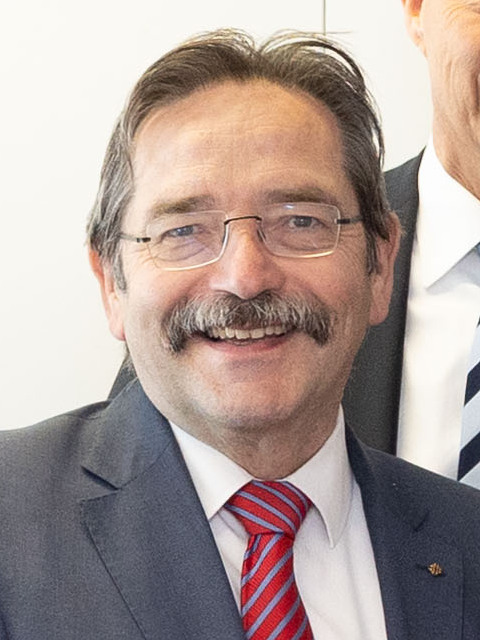
- Bovens in 2025

Leader of the Christian Democratic Appeal in the Senate
- Incumbent
- Assumed office 13 June 2023
- Preceded by: Ben Knapen

Member of the Senate
- Incumbent
- Assumed office 13 June 2023

Mayor of Enschede
- Acting
- In office 2 October 2021 – 1 February 2022
- Preceded by: Henk Jan Meijer (acting)
- Succeeded by: Roelof Bleker

King's Commissioner of Limburg
- In office 30 June 2011 – 19 April 2021
- Monarchs: Beatrix; Willem-Alexander
- Preceded by: Léon Frissen
- Succeeded by: Johan Remkes (acting); Emile Roemer

Personal details
- Born: Theodorus Jozef Franciscus Marie Bovens; 1 October 1959 (age 66) Maastricht, Netherlands
- Children: 1
- Education: Radboud University Nijmegen

Theodorus Jozef Franciscus Marie "Theo" Bovens (Dutch pronunciation: [ˈteːjoː ˈboːvəns]; born 1 October 1959) is a Dutch politician who has served as leader of the Christian Democratic Appeal in the Senate since 13 June 2023. He previously served as the King's Commissioner of Limburg from 30 June 2011 until 19 April 2021. He was acting mayor of Enschede from 2 October 2021 until 1 February 2022.

A member of the Christian Democratic Appeal, he was a member of the municipal council of Maastricht from 1986 to 2002 and served as one of the city's aldermen from 1994 to 2003. From 2003 to 2005 he was Vice Chairman of the Open University in the Netherlands and from 2005 until 2011 he served as chairman. From 2006 to 2011 he was also a member of the Social and Economic Council.

Bovens was born in Maastricht and studied history at Radboud University Nijmegen. He is married and has a daughter.

== Honours and awards ==
- Netherlands: Knight of the Order of Orange-Nassau
- Holy See: Knight of the Order of the Holy Sepulchre (14 April 2007)

Party political offices
Preceded by Ben Knapen	Leader of the Christian Democratic Appeal in the Senate; 2023–present	Incumbent
Political offices
Preceded by Léon Frissen	Queen's/King's Commissioner of Limburg; 2011–2021	Succeeded by Johan Remkes (acting)
