= Charles de Brouckère (1757–1850) =

Belgian-Flemish politician, lawyer, high official, statesman and nobleman

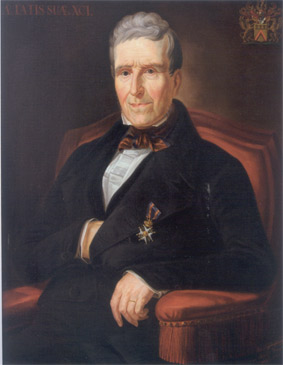
- Charles de Brouckère (1757–1850)

Governor of Limburg
- In office 16 September 1815 – 3 August 1828
- Succeeded by: Maximilien Henri de Beeckman

Member of the First Chamber
- In office 21 October 1828 – 18 October 1830

Personal details
- Born: 6 October 1757 Torhout, Austrian Netherlands
- Died: 29 April 1850 (age 92) Bruges, Belgium
- Party: Orangist
- Spouse: Charlotte-Marie-Anne-Colette de Stoop (m. 1793)
- Children: 5, including Charles and Henri
- Education: University of Leuven

Charles de Brouckère (6 October 1757 – 29 April 1850) was a Belgian, Flemish politician who was a lawyer, high official and statesman during the Austrian rule, under the United Kingdom of the Netherlands and later in the Kingdom of Belgium. He became a nobleman after being knighted by King Willem I on 13 September 1817 in Laeken.

== Personal life ==
Charles (Carolus) de Brouckère was born in Torhout on 6 October 1757 to Johannes Baptiste de Brouckere (1716-1794) and Marie Claire de la Croix (1727-1763). He went on to study law at the University of Leuven and moved to Bruges to practice law following his graduation. De Brouckère married Charlotte-Marie-Anne-Colette de Stoop (1767–1846) in Bruges on 2 July 1793.

The couple went on to have five children:

- Charles de Brouckère (1796–1860), later Mayor of Brussels
- Marie-Pauline de Brouckère (1797–1844)
- Pauline de Brouckère (1798–1854)
- Henri de Brouckère (1801–1891), later Prime Minister of Belgium
- Édouard de Brouckère (1802–1836)

== Political career ==
De Brouckère became a Schepen of the Brugse Vrije in 1785 and served as a judge in Ostend in 1787 before becoming the president of the Court of Bruges in 1794.

=== French Rule ===
Following the French annexation of the Austrian Netherlands in 1795, de Brouckère's judiciary career continued and he moved to Brussels to serve as a Councillor of the Court of appeal in 1800, before returning to Bruges in 1807 to become president of the Criminal Court of the Leiedepartment. He served as the president of the Court of appeal in 1811 and was part of the Corps législatif from 6 January 1813 until 4 June 1814. Following the invasion of the Allied Armies of the Sixth Coalition in January 1814, de Brouckère was appointed Commissioner General on Home Affairs on 15 February by the Provisional Government of Belgium.

=== United Kingdom of the Netherlands ===
Following Napoleon's return from exile and the subsequent War of the Seventh Coalition, de Brouckère was appointed as royal commissioner for the administrative organisation of the Provinces of Namur and Hainaut on 1 May 1815. After Napoleon's ultimate defeat, the United Kingdom of the Netherlands was established following the Congress of Vienna and saw de Brouckère being appointed the first Governor of Limburg by King Willem I on 16 September 1815. For this role, de Brouckère moved to Maastricht as it served as the capitol of the Limburg province which consisted of the combined territory of the modern provinces of Belgian Limburg and Dutch Limburg. While serving as governor, de Brouckère was made a nobleman by being knighted by King Willem I on 13 September 1817 in Laeken. De Brouckère's continued support for permanent unification between the Netherlands and Belgium, alongside his loyalty to King Willem I, made him a political opponent of the later regent of Belgium Baron Érasme-Louis Surlet de Chokier. De Chokier advocated for Belgian independence and was critical of King Willem I. Following de Chokier's election to the Second Chamber in 1828, de Brouckère handed in his resignation as governor, which was accepted on 3 August 1828. De Brouckère was elected to the First Chamber and served in that position from 21 October 1828 until 18 October 1830.

== Later Life & Death ==
Following the Belgian Revolution, which saw Belgium become an independent nation in 1831, de Brouckère retired from politics before he started practicing law again in Bruges in 1841. De Brouckère died in Bruges on 29 April 1850, aged 92.

== Bibliography ==
- Coomans de Brachène, Oscar (1985). État présent de la noblesse belge. Tradition et vie.
- de Stein d'Altenstein, Isidore (1888). Annuaire de la noblesse de Belgique. Muquardt.
- Ramakers, E.P.M. (1989). Charles de Brouckère (1757-1850): gouverneur van Limburg 1815-1828.
- Roppe, Louis (1968). Nationaal Biografisch Woordenboek Deel III.
- Van den Abeele, Andries (2009). De Balie van Brugge. Geschiedenis van de Orde van advocaten in het gerechtelijk arrondissement Brugge 1810-1950. vanden Broele. ISBN 978-90-4960-0228.
