= Pieter Maria Frans van Meeuwen =

Dutch jurist

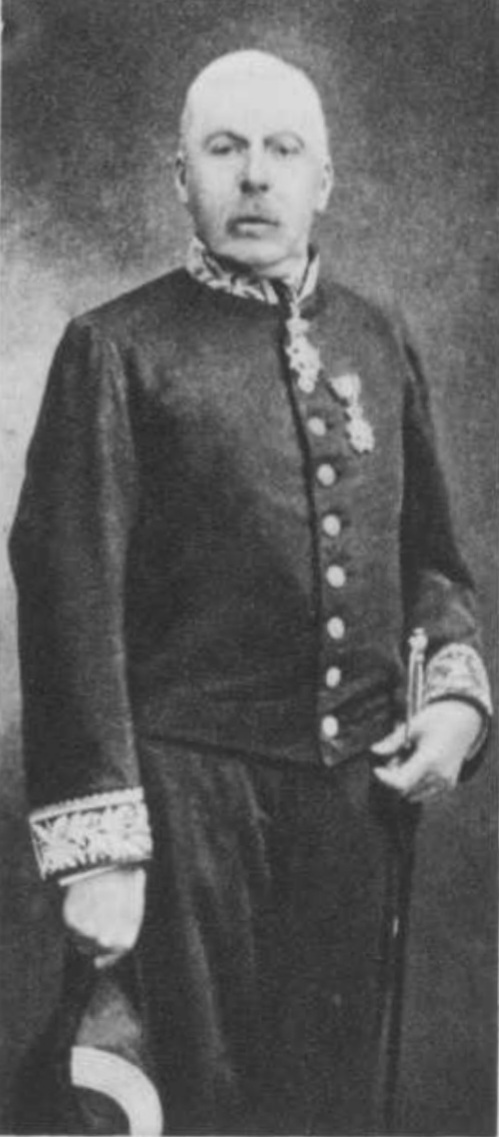
Jhr. P.F.M. van Meeuwen

Jonkheer Pieter Maria Frans van Meeuwen (1837 's-Hertogenbosch - 1913 's-Hertogenbosch), was a Dutch jurist and president of the court of justice. He was a member of the Catholic elite and a member of the lower nobility with the title jonkheer.

Van Meeuwen was the son of Eduardus Johannes Petrus van Meeuwen, a governor of Limburg, and Cornelia Theresia Hanssen. Pieter's grandfather Petrus Andreas van Meeuwen was a large brewer in 's-Hertogenbosch and Amsterdam. He was a member of the National Assembly and belonged to the moderate unitarians, who were advocates of a central government. Pieter van Meeuwen studied law at Leiden University. From 1859 he was a lawyer in 's-Hertogenbosch.
