= Léon Frissen =

Dutch politician (born 1950)

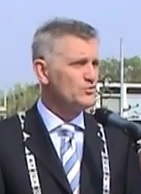
L.J.P.M. Frissen (2005)

Leonardus Johannes Petrus Maria (Léon) Frissen (Beek, 24 June 1950) was Queen's Commissioner or Queen's Governor of the province of Limburg, Netherlands.

In the Dutch province of Limburg, the Queen's Commissioner is usually called "Gouverneur" (governor), as in Belgium. Similarly, the "Provinciehuis" (Province Hall) at Maastricht is called "Gouvernement" (Governor's Residence). This local custom arose from the particular status of the current province in the nineteenth century.

== Career ==
- 1971–1975 Council officer of the municipality Bingelrade (presently the municipality Onderbanken).
- 1975–1979 Chief executive of the municipalities Bingelrade and Jabeek (presently the municipality Onderbanken).
- 1979–1986 Director CDA-bureau Limburg in Sittard.
- 1986–1994 Member of parliament (CDA).
- 1994–2001 Mayor of the municipality Arcen en Velden.
- 2001–2005 Mayor of the municipality Horst aan de Maas.
- 2005-2011 Queen's Commissioner of the province of Limburg.
- 2015–2018 Acting mayor of the municipality Schinnen, presently the municipality of Beekdaelen)

Political offices
Preceded by Berend-Jan van Voorst tot Voorst	Queen's Commissioner of Limburg; 2005 - 2011	Succeeded by Theo Bovens
