= Napoleon's Return from Elba (painting) =

1818 painting by Charles de Steuben

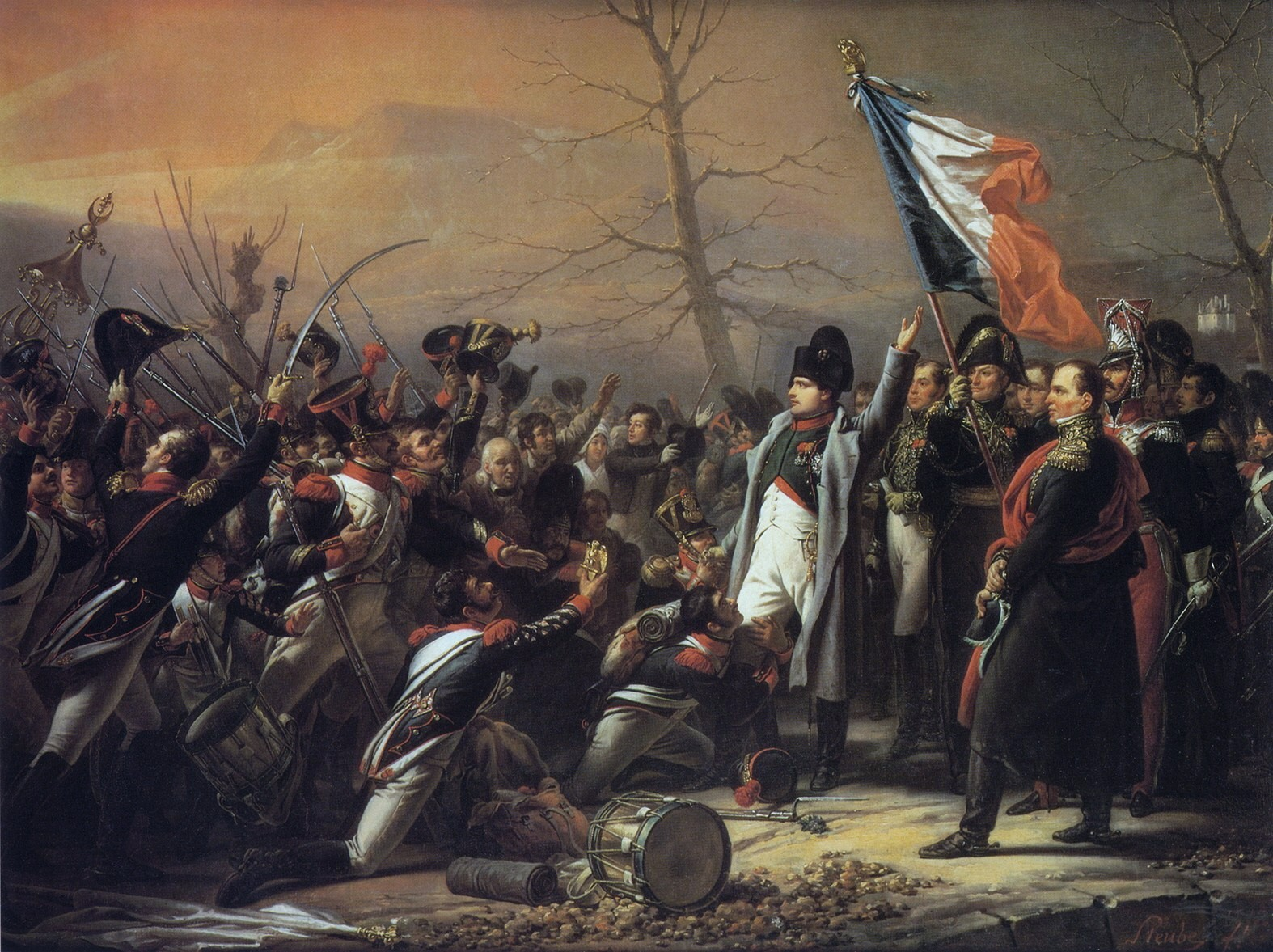
- Artist: Charles de Steuben
- Year: 1818
- Type: Oil on canvas, history painting
- Dimensions: 97 cm × 128.5 cm (38 in × 50.6 in)
- Location: Private collection

Napoleon's Return from Elba (French: Retour de Napoleon d' Isle d'Elbe) is an 1818 history painting by the German-born French painter Charles de Steuben. It depicts an incident which occurred at Laffrey on 7 March 1815 when Napoleon, having escaped from Elba, was acclaimed by troops of the French Royal Army's 7th Line Infantry Regiment. The 7th Regiment, commanded by Charles de la Bédoyère, defected en masse to Napoleon after he approached the regiment and challenged them to shoot him. Their defection was a significant milestone on Napoleon's triumphant march on Paris, which resulted in the Hundred Days. De la Bédoyère was later executed following Napoleon's defeat at the Battle of Waterloo and the Allied occupation of Paris. By the time the painting was produced, Napoleon was in exile on the island of Saint Helena as a British prisoner. The painting has been described as a "superb - and wildly unrealistic - piece of artistic propaganda".

== Bibliography ==
- Bell, David A. Napoleon: A Concise Biography. Oxford University Press, 2015.
- Blanning, T.C.W. The Oxford Illustrated History of Modern Europe. OUP, 2001.
- Esdaile, Charles. Napoleon, France and Waterloo: The Eagle Rejected. Pen and Sword, 30 Nov 2016.
- Muir, Rory. Wellington: Waterloo and the Fortunes of Peace 1814–1852. Yale University Press, 2015.
