= Ton Frinking =

Dutch politician (1931–2022)

Ton Frinking MP
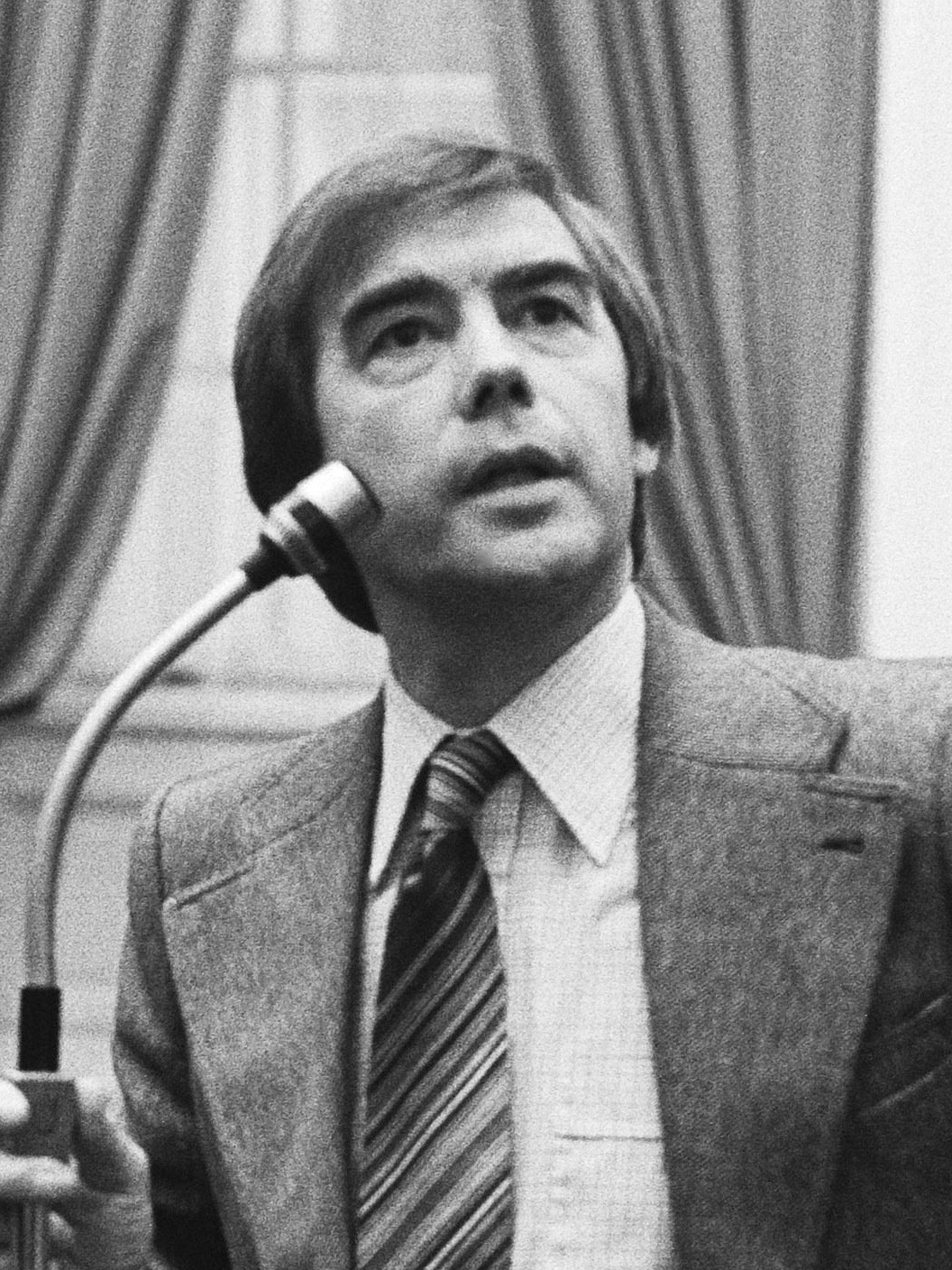
- Frinking in 1979

Member of the House of Representatives
- In office 22 December 1977 – 1 June 1993

Personal details
- Born: Antonius Bernardus Matthijs Frinking; 1 February 1931 Groningen, Netherlands
- Died: 3 August 2022 (aged 91) Delft, Netherlands
- Party: Christian Democratic Appeal; Catholic People's Party

Antonius Bernardus Matthijs Frinking (1 February 1931 – 3 August 2022) was a Dutch politician. He served in the Royal Netherlands Army as a major from 1969 to 1975 and as lieutenant colonel from 1975 to 1977. He served as a member of the House of Representatives from 1977 to 1993.

Frinking died on 3 August 2022 in Delft, at the age of 91.
