= Orangism (Kingdom of the Netherlands) =

Liberal-monarchist trend

In the context of the Kingdom of the Netherlands, Orangism is royalism that favors the House of Orange's rules as kings and queens. Orangism became a political force in the 1860s, when it was embraced by the dominant liberal tendency. It was presented as a national apolitical stance to gather the support of monarchist Protestants and Catholics, but liberal Orangism was in fact an attempt at achieving national unity at the expense of socialist and denominational politics.
