= Petrus Andreas van Meeuwen =

Dutch politician (1772–1848)

Jonkheer Petrus Andreas van Meeuwen ('s-Hertogenbosch, January 27, 1772 – Maastricht, August 19, 1848) was a Dutch politician, lawyer, a member of the House of Representatives of the Netherlands, and a member of the Council of State of the Netherlands.

== Career ==
Van Meeuwen grew up in 's-Hertogenbosch in the Catholic family van Meeuwen. His father, Johannes Petrus van Meeuwen, was a hereditary secretary of the council of the North Brabant villages Oss, Lithoyen, Berghem, Heeswijk and Nistelrode.

The younger Van Meeuwen studied law in Leiden. In 1803 he was created attorney-general of North Brabant. King Louis Napoleon made him a member of the Council of State in the Netherlands. From 1809 to 1811 he was general director of the Dutch customs. After the liberation from the French Van Meeuwen held the position of director of the real properties of the State in North Brabant. From 1817 to 1842 he was a member of the States-Provincial, and a year later he was chosen as a member of the House of Representatives for the province of North Brabant. For his services, in 1834 King William admitted Van Meeuwen as a member of the Brabant nobility with the honorific of jonkheer.

== Private life ==
Van Meeuwen married with Rosa Cornelia Solvyns (1777-1805) in Antwerp in 1800. They had two children, one daughter and one son, both born in Wassenaar. The son was Eduardus Johannes Petrus van Meeuwen.

== Delegated commissions ==
- Civil servant at the Ministry of General Affairs (15 November 1800 to 30 June 1808)
- Civil servant of the Ministry of Finance (30 June 1808 to 1 January 1812)

== Orders of Knighthood ==
- Order of the Netherlands Lion
- Order of Orange-Nassau
- Order of the Union (given by Louis Bonaparte)

== Sources ==
- P.J. Molhuysen & P.J. Blok, Nieuw Nederlandsch Biografisch Woordenboek (NNBW), vol. VIII, p. 1142-1143
