= Eduardus Johannes Petrus van Meeuwen =

Dutch politician (1802–1873)

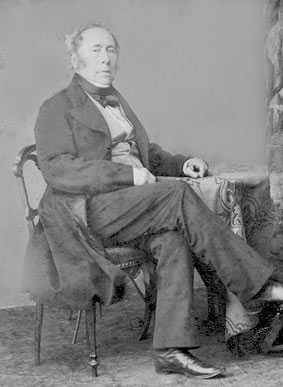
E.J.P. van Meeuwen

Jonkheer Eduardus Johannes Petrus van Meeuwen (12 September 1802 in 's-Hertogenbosch – 8 October 1873 in 's-Hertogenbosch) was a Dutch politician from a Catholic family. In 1834, with his father, he was created a member of the lower nobility by King William I of the Netherlands with the title of jonkheer.

Van Meeuwen, a son of Petrus Andreas van Meeuwen, was to become president of the Senate of the Netherlands. In 1846 he was made governor of Limburg, the last with this official title; the function is now called King's (or Queen's) commissioner.
