= List of members of the Senate of the Netherlands, 2011–2015 =

Senate, 2011–2015
←	2007–2011	2015–2019	→
- Composition of the Senate

Overview
- Legislative body: Senate
- Meeting place: Binnenhof
- Term: 7 June 2011 – 8 June 2015
- Election: 2011
- Members: 75
- President of the Senate: Fred de Graaf; Ankie Broekers-Knol

Between 7 June 2011 and 8 June 2015, 85 individuals served as representatives in the Senate, the 75-seat upper house of the States-General of the Netherlands. 75 representatives were elected in the 23 May 2011 Senate election and installed at the start of the term; 10 representatives were appointed as replacements when elected representatives resigned or went on leave.

During this period, the first and second Rutte cabinets reigned. The former coalition consisted of the People's Party for Freedom and Democracy (VVD, 16 seats) and Christian Democratic Appeal (CDA, 11 seats), with confidence and supply from the Party for Freedom (PVV, 9 seats). The opposition was composed of the Labour Party (PvdA, 14 seats), Socialist Party (SP, 8 seats), Democrats 66 (D66, 5 seats), GroenLinks (GL, 5 seats), Christian Union (CU, 2 seats), Reformed Political Party (SGP, 1 seat), 50PLUS (50+, 1 seat), Party for the Animals (PvdD, 1 seat), and Independent Senate Group (OSF, 1 seat).

== Members ==
All members are sworn in at the start of the term, even if they are not new. Assumed office in this list therefore refers to the swearing in during this term (or return date of members who left), while all members are automatically considered to have left office at the end of the term.

Members of the Senate of the Netherlands, 2011–2015
Name	Parliamentary group	Assumed office	Left office	Ref.
Joris Backer	D66	7 June 2011	8 June 2015	
Marleen Barth	PvdA	7 June 2011	8 June 2015	
Henk Beckers	VVD	7 June 2011	8 June 2015	
Martin van Beek	PVV	2 October 2012	8 June 2015	
Jannette Beuving	PvdA	7 June 2011	8 June 2015	
Sophie van Bijsterveld	CDA	7 June 2011	8 June 2015	
Margreet de Boer	GL	7 June 2011	8 June 2015	
Roger van Boxtel	D66	7 June 2011	8 June 2015	
Elco Brinkman	CDA	7 June 2011	8 June 2015	
Willem Bröcker	VVD	7 June 2011	8 June 2015	
Ankie Broekers-Knol	VVD	7 June 2011	8 June 2015	
Jan Anthonie Bruijn	VVD	6 November 2012	8 June 2015	
Peter van Dijk	PVV	7 June 2011	8 June 2015	
Adri Duivesteijn	PvdA	5 February 2013	8 June 2015	
Heleen Dupuis	VVD	7 June 2011	8 June 2015	
Anne-Wil Duthler	VVD	7 June 2011	8 June 2015	
Tuur Elzinga	SP	7 June 2011	8 June 2015	
Hans Engels	D66	7 June 2011	8 June 2015	
Peter Essers	CDA	7 June 2011	8 June 2015	
Peter Ester	CU	7 June 2011	8 June 2015	
Marjolein Faber	PVV	7 June 2011	8 June 2015	
Anne Flierman	CDA	7 June 2011	8 June 2015	
Hans Franken	CDA	7 June 2011	8 June 2015	
Mariëtte Frijters-Klijnen	PVV	7 June 2011	8 June 2015	
Ruard Ganzevoort	GL	7 June 2011	8 June 2015	
Arda Gerkens	SP	14 May 2013	8 June 2015	
Fred de Graaf	VVD	7 June 2011	8 June 2015	
Machiel de Graaf	PVV	7 June 2011	20 September 2012 (Note: Left to join the House of Representatives)	
Thom de Graaf	D66	7 June 2011	8 June 2015	
Marcel de Graaff	PVV	7 June 2011	30 June 2014 (Note: Left to join the European Parliament)	
Frank de Grave	VVD	7 June 2011	8 June 2015	
Loek Hermans	VVD	7 June 2011	8 June 2015	
Wopke Hoekstra	CDA	7 June 2011	8 June 2015	
Gerrit Holdijk	SGP	7 June 2011	8 June 2015	
Guusje ter Horst	PvdA	7 June 2011	8 June 2015	
Helmi Huijbregts-Schiedon	VVD	7 June 2011	8 June 2015	
Frank van Kappen	VVD	7 June 2011	8 June 2015	
Reinette Klever	PVV	7 June 2011	20 September 2012	
Liesbeth Kneppers-Heynert	VVD	7 June 2011	8 June 2015	
Menno Knip	VVD	7 June 2011	8 June 2015	
Niko Koffeman	PvdD	7 June 2011	8 June 2015	
Kees Kok	PVV	2 October 2012	8 June 2015	
Anne Koning	PvdA	18 June 2013	8 June 2015	
Ruud Koole	PvdA	7 June 2011	8 June 2015	
Alexander Kops	PVV	8 July 2014	8 June 2015	
Tiny Kox	SP	7 June 2011	8 June 2015	
Roel Kuiper	CU	7 June 2011	8 June 2015	
Kees de Lange	OSF (Note: Until 19 May 2015)	7 June 2011	8 June 2015	
Kees de Lange	De Lange (Note: Starting 19 May 2015)	7 June 2011	8 June 2015	
René van der Linden	CDA	7 June 2011	8 June 2015	
Marijke Linthorst	PvdA	7 June 2011	8 June 2015	
Pia Lokin-Sassen	CDA	7 June 2011	8 June 2015	
Maria Martens	CDA	7 June 2011	8 June 2015	
Erik Meijer	SP	8 July 2014	8 June 2015	
Pauline Meurs	PvdA	7 June 2011	14 January 2013 (Note: Left to join the Dutch Safety Board)	
Jan Nagel	50+	7 June 2011	8 June 2015	
Han Noten	PvdA	7 June 2011	4 February 2013 (Note: Left for personal reasons)	
Gabriëlle Popken	PVV	7 June 2011	8 June 2015	
André Postema	PvdA	7 June 2011	8 June 2015	
Kim Putters	PvdA	7 June 2011	14 June 2013 (Note: Left to become director of The Netherlands Institute for Social Research)	
Nanneke Quik-Schuijt	SP	7 June 2011	8 June 2015	
Geert Reuten	SP	7 June 2011	8 June 2015	
Jos van Rey	VVD	7 June 2011	22 October 2012 (Note: Left because of a scandal)	
Tobias Reynaers	PVV	7 June 2011	8 June 2015	
Bob Ruers	SP	7 June 2011	8 June 2015	
Sybe Schaap	VVD	7 June 2011	8 June 2015	
Marijke Scholten	D66	7 June 2011	8 June 2015	
Koos Schouwenaar	VVD	7 June 2011	8 June 2015	
Nico Schrijver	PvdA	7 June 2011	8 June 2015	
Esther-Mirjam Sent	PvdA	7 June 2011	8 June 2015	
Tineke Slagter-Roukema	SP	7 June 2011	8 June 2015	
Eric Smaling	SP	7 June 2011	12 May 2013	
Ronald Sørensen	PVV	7 June 2011	8 June 2015	
Gom van Strien	PVV	7 June 2011	8 June 2015	
Tineke Strik	GL	7 June 2011	8 June 2015	
Ben Swagerman	VVD	7 June 2011	8 June 2015	
Joyce Sylvester	PvdA	7 June 2011	8 June 2015	
Gerrit Terpstra	CDA	7 June 2011	8 June 2015	
Tof Thissen	GL	7 June 2011	8 June 2015	
Arjan Vliegenthart	SP	7 June 2011	1 July 2014 (Note: Left to become alderman in Amsterdam)	
Janny Vlietstra	PvdA	7 June 2011	8 June 2015	
Marijke Vos	GL	7 June 2011	8 June 2015	
Klaas de Vries	PvdA	7 June 2011	8 June 2015	
Greetje de Vries-Leggedoor	CDA	7 June 2011	8 June 2015	
Willem Witteveen	PvdA	15 January 2013	17 July 2014 (Note: Died in office)	
Wouter van Zandbrink	PvdA	23 September 2014	8 June 2015	

== See also ==
- List of candidates in the 2011 Dutch Senate election
