= List of candidates in the 2011 Dutch Senate election =

For the 2011 Dutch Senate election, 13 electoral lists were successfully submitted, totalling 246 candidates.

The 75 seats were awarded to party lists, with candidates over the preference threshold awarded a seat first if available and the other seats awarded based on position on the list. The preference threshold for this election was 2,215 weighted votes (same as the electoral threshold). Two candidate would have not been elected based on position on the list, but received enough preference votes: Peter Essers (Christian Democratic Appeal) and Janny Vlietsta (Labour Party). Replacements are also asked based on position on the list.

== 1: Christian Democratic Appeal ==
Candidate list for Christian Democratic Appeal
Position	Candidate	Votes	Weighted votes	Result
1	Elco Brinkman		17,355	Elected
2	Sophie van Bijsterveld		2,230	Elected
3	Greetje de Vries-Leggedoor	0	0	Elected
4	René van der Linden	0	0	Elected
5	Anne Flierman	0	0	Elected
6	Maria Martens	0	0	Elected
7	Hans Franken	0	0	Elected
8	Gerrit Terpstra	0	0	Elected
9	Wopke Hoekstra		2,445	Elected
10	Pia Lokin-Sassen	0	0	Elected
11	Siem Buijs	0	0	
12	Peter Essers		2,230	Elected
13	Geart Benedictus	0	0	
14	Henk Tiesinga	0	0	
15	Lianne Dekker	0	0	
16	Huub Doek	0	0	
17	Geert Jansen	0	0	
18	Eric Janse de Jonge	0	0	
19	Hans Klein Breteler	0	0	
20	Karel Leunissen	0	0	
21	Marian Passchier	0	0	
22	Sebastiaan Roes	0	0	
23	Marianne Luyer	0	0	
24	Piet Boekhoud	0	0	
25	Marja van der Tas	0	0	
26	Marius Buiting	0	0	
27	Annie Kamp	0	0	
28	Anne-Marie Vreman-Muijrers	0	0	
29	Wim van Fessem	0	0	
30	Frank van den Heuvel	0	0	
Total			24,260	

== 2: People's Party for Freedom and Democracy ==
Candidate list for People's Party for Freedom and Democracy
Position	Candidate	Votes	Weighted votes	Result
1	Loek Hermans	105	32,526	Elected
2	Heleen Dupuis	4	1,460	Elected
3	Liesbeth Kneppers-Heijnert	0	0	Elected
4	Fred de Graaf	0	0	Elected
5	Frank de Grave	0	0	Elected
6	Ankie Broekers-Knol	0	0	Elected
7	Helmi Huijbregts-Schiedon	0	0	Elected
8	Jos van Rey	1	239	Elected
9	Willem Bröcker	0	0	Elected
10	Frank van Kappen	0	0	Elected
11	Anne-Wil Duthler	0	0	Elected
12	Sybe Schaap	0	0	Elected
13	Menno Knip	0	0	Elected
14	Henk Beckers	0	0	Elected
15	Koos Schouwenaar	1	365	Elected
16	Ben Swagerman	0	0	Elected
17	Jan Anthonie Bruijn	0	0	Replacement
18	Henk Jan Meijer	0	0	
19	Han ter Heegde	0	0	
20	Henry Meijdam	0	0	
21	Sipke Swierstra	0	0	
22	Florus Wijsenbeek	0	0	
23	Harry Dijksma	0	0	
24	Joop Boertjens	0	0	
25	Jan Schrijen	0	0	
26	Frans Willem Lantink	0	0	
27	Paul Zevenbergen	0	0	
28	Duco Lodder	0	0	
29	Ida van Veldhuizen	0	0	
30	Bert van Dijk	0	0	
31	Hans Kapelle	0	0	
32	Ger Jaarsma	0	0	
33	Kees Bierens	0	0	
Total			34,590	

== 3: Labour Party ==
Candidate list for Labour Party
Position	Candidate	Votes	Weighted votes	Result
1	Marleen Barth			Elected
2	Kim Putters			Elected
3	Pauline Meurs			Elected
4	Klaas de Vries			Elected
5	Guusje ter Horst			Elected
6	Han Noten			Elected
7	Jannette Beuving			Elected
8	Ruud Koole			Elected
9	Joyce Sylvester			Elected
10	Nico Schrijver			Elected
11	Marijke Linthorst			Elected
12	Adri Duivesteijn			Replacement
13	Esther-Mirjam Sent			Elected
14	André Postema			Elected
15	Janny Vlietstra			Elected
16	Willem Witteveen			Replacement
17	Anne Koning			Replacement
18	Wouter van Zandbrink			Replacement
19	Flora Goudappel			
20	Pieter Smidt van Gelder			
21	Wilma Brouwer			
22	Rudi Schouwaert			
23	Ineke Ketelaar			
24	Michiel Hardon			
25	Martien Branderhorst			
26	Alper Tekin Erdogan			
27	Marijke Drees			
28	Kees van Paridon			
Total				

== 4: GroenLinks ==
Candidate list for GroenLinks
Position	Candidate	Votes	Weighted votes	Result
1	Tof Thissen			Elected
2	Tineke Strik			Elected
3	Marijke Vos			Elected
4	Ruard Ganzevoort			Elected
5	Margreet de Boer			Elected
6	Yolan Koster-Dreese			
7	Harmen Binnema			
8	Cees van Eijk			
9	Jan Laurier			
10	Brechtje Paardekooper			
11	Kees Duijvestein			
12	Tys de Ruijter			
13	Han Warmelink			
14	Michaël Boddeke			
15	Marten Wiersma			
Total				

== 5: Socialist Party ==
Candidate list for Socialist Party
Position	Candidate	Votes	Weighted votes	Result
1	Tiny Kox			Elected
2	Tineke Slagter-Roukema			Elected
3	Eric Smaling			Elected
4	Arjan Vliegenthart			Elected
5	Arda Gerkens			Elected
6	Geert Reuten			Elected
7	Bob Ruers			Elected
8	Tuur Elzinga			Elected
9	Nanneke Quik-Schuijt			Replacement
10	Ineke Palm			
11	Erik Meijer			Replacement
12	Hugo Polderman			
13	Paul Lempens			
14	Meta Meijer			
15	Leo Steenbakkers			
16	Peter Verschuren			
17	Remi Poppe			
18	Mahmut Erciyas			
19	Alie Dekker-van het Hof			
20	Tjitske Siderius			
21	Trix de Roos-Consemulder			
22	Peter Lucassen			
23	Frans Mulckhuijse			
24	Jos van der Horst			
25	Hans-Martin Don			
26	Mariska ten Heuw			
27	Willem Bouman			
28	Rikus Brader			
29	Sineke ten Horn			
30	Riet de Wit-Romans			
Total				

== 6: Democrats 66 ==
Candidate list for Democrats 66 (D66)
Position	Candidate	Votes	Weighted votes	Result
1	Roger van Boxtel			Elected
2	Hans Engels			Elected
3	Marijke Scholten			Elected
4	Joris Backer			Elected
5	Thom de Graaf			Elected
6	Mischa Wladimiroff			
7	Klaartje Peters			
8	Han Entzinger			
9	Marga Kool			
10	Ernst Bakker			
11	Menno Witteveen			
12	Johanna Boogerd-Quaak			
13	Bob van den Bos			
14	Huub Linthorst			
15	Anna Galama			
16	Petra van den Boomgaard			
17	Arnaud Booij			
18	Sietske van Oogen-Visser			
19	Marion di Bucchianico-Bakker			
20	Zafer Yurdakul			
21	Tjerk Jouwstra			
22	Remco Jaasma			
Total				

== 7: ChristianUnion ==
Candidate list for ChristianUnion
Position	Candidate	Votes	Weighted votes	Result
1	Roel Kuiper			Elected
2	Peter Ester			Elected
3	Simone Kennedy-Doornbos			
4	Herman Sietsma			
5	Leen van Dijke			
6	Beatrice de Graaf			
7	Marjan Haak-Griffioen			
8	Bert Groen			
9	Adriaan Hoogendoorn			
10	Martijn van Meppelen Scheppink			
11	Henk Schaafsma			
12	Thijs van Daalen			
13	Rein Ferwerda			
14	Gerdien Rots			
15	Jan Westert			
16	Jurn de Vries			
17	Kees van Kranenburg			
18	Henk van Rhee			
19	Robert de Graaff			
20	Harry Lamberink			
21	Joop Evertse			
22	Gerrit Jan Bolks			
Total				

== 8: Reformed Political Party ==
Candidate list for Reformed Political Party
Position	Candidate	Votes	Weighted votes	Result
1	Gerrit Holdijk			Elected
2	Peter Schalk			
3	Peter Zevenbergen			
4	Diederik van Dijk			
5	Dick van Meeuwen			
6	George van Heukelom			
7	Servaas Stoop			
8	Rien Bogerd			
9	Dick Heemskerk			
10	Jan Luteijn			
11	Ton de Jong			
12	Gert-Jan Kats			
13	Dirk van Dijk			
14	Jaap Hoekman			
15	Wim Fieret			
16	Arnold Weggeman			
17	Hans Tanis			
18	Aart de Kruijf			
19	Leo Barth			
20	Piter de Vries			
Total				

== 9: Independent Senate Group ==
Candidate list for Independent Senate Group
Position	Candidate	Votes	Weighted votes	Result
1	Kees de Lange			Elected
2	Hendrik ten Hoeve			
3	Marten Bierman			
4	François Babijn			
Total				

== 10: Party for the Animals ==
Candidate list for Party for the Animals
Position	Candidate	Votes	Weighted votes	Result
1	Niko Koffeman			Elected
2	Birgit Verstappen			
3	Erno Eskens			
4	Diederik van Liere			
5	Karen Soeters			
6	Ton Dekker			
7	Paul Cliteur			
Total				

== 11: Party for Freedom ==
Candidate list for the Party for Freedom
Number	Candidate	Votes	Weighted votes	Result
1	Machiel de Graaf	39	11,403	Elected
2	Reinette Klever	2	730	Elected
3	Marcel de Graaff	0	0	Elected
4	Gom van Strien	1	239	Elected
5	Ronald Sørensen	3	1,402	Elected
6	Tobias Reynaers	0	0	Elected
7	Gabriëlle Popken	3	943	Elected
8	Marjolein Faber	0	0	Elected
9	Mariëtte Frijters-Klijnen	8	3,568	Elected
10	Peter van Dijk	5	490	Elected
11	Martin van Beek	0	0	Replacement
12	Kees Kok	9	2,173	Replacement
13	Rick Deurloo	0	0	
14	Alexander Kops	1	641	Replacement
15	Pascal Romeijn	0	0	
16	Rita Folkersma	1	120	
17	Ruud Muste	0	0	
18	Nathalie Choenni	0	0	
19	Menno Ludriks	0	0	
20	Yvonne Waterman	0	0	
Total			21,709	

== 12: 50PLUS ==
Candidate list for 50PLUS
Position	Candidate	Votes	Weighted votes	Result
1	Jan Nagel			Elected
2	Martine Baay-Timmerman			
3	Michel van Hulten			
4	Henk Krol			
5	Cees Steendam Visser			
6	Cor Slothouber			
7	John Peters			
8	Mieke Hoek			
9	Leo Meerts			
10	Dieuwke van der Haak - Levers			
11	Roy Ho Ten Soeng			
12	Willem Holthuizen			
13	Otto Vellinga			
14	Alexander Münninghoff			
Total				

== 13: List Koornstra ==
Candidate list for List Koornstra
Position	Candidate	Votes	Weighted votes	Result
1	Ruud Koornstra			
Total				
