= Alexander Kops =

Dutch politician (born 1984)

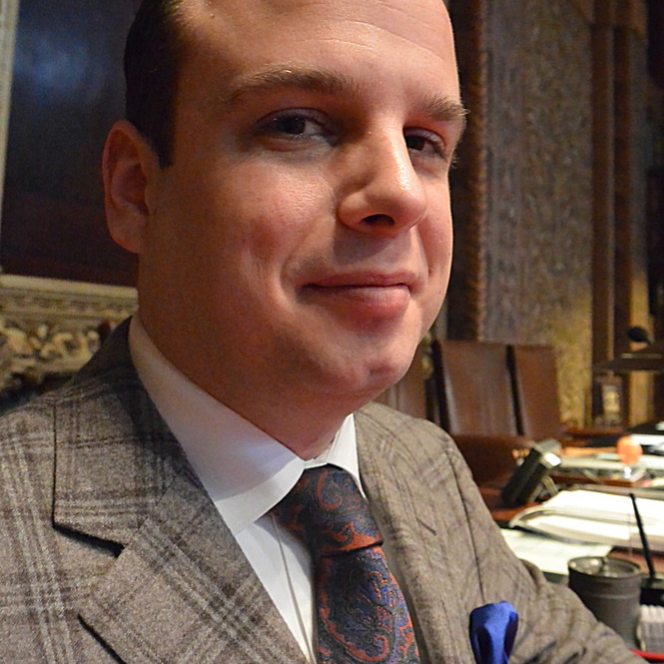
- Kops in 2015

Member of the House of Representatives
- Incumbent
- Assumed office 23 March 2017

Member of the Senate
- In office 8 July 2014 – 21 March 2017
- Preceded by: Marcel de Graaff
- Succeeded by: Peter van Dijk

Member of the Provincial Council of Gelderland
- In office 26 March 2015 – 11 April 2017
- Succeeded by: Elmar Vlottes

Personal details
- Born: 23 November 1984 (age 41) Leidschendam, Netherlands
- Party: Party for Freedom
- Children: 1
- Education: Leiden University; Rotterdam University of Applied Sciences
- Occupation: Politician; political staffer; teacher

Alexander Kops (Dutch: [aːlɛkˈsɑndər ˈkɔps]; born 23 November 1984) is a Dutch politician. On behalf of the right-wing populist Party for Freedom (PVV), he served in the Senate from 2014 to 2017, and he has served in the House of Representatives since 2017.

== Early life and career ==
Kops was born on 23 November 1984 in Leidschendam, and he later lived in Zoetermeer. Aged 16, he wrote a book about German grammar that was printed by Wolters-Noordhoff in 2003. He also wrote novels and poems in his adolescence, some of which appeared in the magazine De Brakke Hond. He called Herman Gorter his inspiration, and his poetry collection titled Door maanlicht gewekt (Awoken by moonlight) was published in 2015.

Kops received his propaedeutic diploma in German language teaching from the Rotterdam University of Applied Sciences in 2004, and he subsequently studied German language and culture at Leiden University until 2009. He was enrolled in Islamic studies for a short while. Kops taught German at Visser 't Hooft Lyceum in Leiderdorp starting in 2008, but his contract was not renewed a few months after he was placed 27th on the PVV list in the March 2010 general election.

== Political career ==
In January 2011, Kops became a policy advisor of the PVV group in the European Parliament. He ran for the Senate in May 2011 as the party's 14th candidate, but he was not elected since the PVV won 10 seats. He was sworn into the Senate on 8 July 2014 to succeed Marcel de Graaff, who had been elected to the European Parliament. He again occupied the 14th spot on the party list in the May 2015 Senate election. Despite the PVV securing nine seats, he was elected because he received more preference votes than any other candidate of his party. He was secretary of his parliamentary group from June 2015 until March 2017, and his portfolio contained foreign affairs, Europe, environment, spatial planning, and infrastructure. Kops also served on the Provincial Council of Gelderland from March 2015 until April 2017.

In the March 2017 general election, he was the PVV's 19th candidate. He was elected to the House of Representatives and resigned from the Senate, taking his seat on 23 March 2017. Kops was re-elected to the House in March 2021 and in November 2023. He has served as the PVV's spokesperson for education, social affairs, housing, energy, climate, and medical ethics.

== Personal life ==
Kops has a wife and a daughter. As of 2025, he lived in Overasselt, Gelderland.

== Electoral history ==
Electoral history of Alexander Kops
Year	Body	Party	Pos.	Votes	Result		Ref.
Year	Body	Party	Pos.	Votes	Party seats	Individual	Ref.
2010	House of Representatives	Party for Freedom	27	319	24 / 150	Lost	
2011	Senate	Party for Freedom	14	641 (Note: Weighted vote total to account for population differences between provinces. 1 vote was cast for Kops.)	10 / 75	Lost (Note: Kops was appointed to the body later during the term due to a vacancy.)	
2012	House of Representatives	Party for Freedom	27	229	15 / 150	Lost	
2015	Provincial Council of Gelderland	Party for Freedom	2	7,334	5 / 55	Won	
2015	Senate	Party for Freedom	14	5,214 (Note: Weighted vote total to account for population differences between provinces. 12 votes were cast for Kops.)	9 / 75	Won	
2017	House of Representatives	Party for Freedom	19	679	20 / 150	Won	
2019	Provincial Council of Gelderland	Party for Freedom	12 (Note: Kops participated as lijstduwer.)		3 / 55	Lost	
2021	House of Representatives	Party for Freedom	6	1,128	17 / 150	Won	
2023	House of Representatives	Party for Freedom	11	845	37 / 150	Won	
2025	House of Representatives	Party for Freedom	12	436	26 / 150	Won	
