= Emiel van Dijk =

Dutch politician (born 1985)

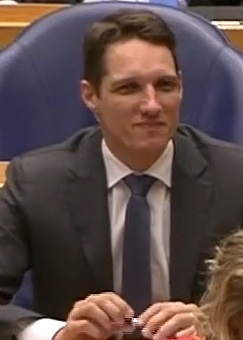

Member of the House of Representatives
- Incumbent
- Assumed office 12 November 2025
- In office April 2018 – March 2021

Member Provincial Council of North Brabant
- Incumbent
- Assumed office March 2011

Personal details
- Born: 22 March 1985 (age 41) The Hague, Netherlands
- Party: Party for Freedom

Emiel van Dijk (born 22 March 1985) is a Dutch politician and a member of the Party for Freedom. He represented the party on the Provincial Council of North Brabant and in 2023 started his third time as a member of the House of Representatives.

== Career ==
Van Dijk worked as a legislative assistant to PVV MEPS Lucas Hartong and Vicky Maeijer. In April 2018, he became a temporary member of the House of Representatives to cover for Gabrielle Popken who had gone on maternity leave and remained in the House to replace Karen Gerbrands who was on leave until 2021. In the 2023 general election, van Dijk was number 17 on the Party for Freedom list, and he assumed his place in the House of Representatives on 6 December 2023. He subsequently was his party's spokesperson for European affairs until his portfolio changed to justice.

During a 2020 debate on immigration in the House of Representatives, Van Dijk used the word "omvolking" (or "demographic replacement") when referring to his opposition to European migration pact. The debate was temporarily stopped after Christian Union MP Joël Voordewind accused Van Dijk of "using a term from the Nazi era" to which Van Dijk described Voordewind's comment as "too much for words" and demanded that he withdraw the accusation.

In 2021, Van Dijk objected to House of Representatives criticism of the Hungarian government of Viktor Orban. Bram van Ojik had referred to Orban's 'limiting of press freedom, starting antisemitic campaigns, and limiting juridicial power'. Van Dijk defended Orban, claiming him to be "a leader that chooses for his own people."

== Electoral history ==
Electoral history of Emiel van Dijk
Year	Body	Party	Pos.	Votes	Result		Ref.
Year	Body	Party	Pos.	Votes	Party seats	Individual	Ref.
2012	House of Representatives	Party for Freedom	44	199	15	Lost	
2017	House of Representatives	Party for Freedom	21	599	20	Lost (Note: Van Dijk was appointed to the body later during the term due to a vacancy.)	
2021	House of Representatives	Party for Freedom	20	176	17	Lost	
2023	House of Representatives	Party for Freedom	17	410	37	Won	
2025	House of Representatives	Party for Freedom	19	444	26	Won	
