= 2007 Dutch Senate election =

- 29 May 2007
- All 75 seats in the Senate; 38 seats needed for a majority
Party	Leader	Vote %	Seats	+/–
CDA	Jos Werner	26.7	21	−2
VVD	Uri Rosenthal	19.2	14	−1
PvdA	Han Noten	19.0	14	−5
SP	Tiny Kox	15.5	12	+8
CU	Egbert Schuurman	6.0	4	+2
GL	Tof Thissen	5.6	4	−1
SGP	Gerrit Holdijk	2.3	2	0
D66	Gerard Schouw	2.0	2	−1
PvdD	Niko Koffeman	2.1	1	New
OSF	Henk ten Hoeve	1.8	1	0
This lists parties that won seats. See the complete results below.
President of the Senate before	President of the Senate after
Yvonne Timmerman-Buck; CDA	René van der Linden; CDA

Elections to the Dutch Senate were held on 29 May 2007, following the provincial elections on 7 March 2007. The 564 members of the twelve States-Provincial elected the 75 Senate members. The new Senate was installed on 12 June 2007.

== Prominent candidates ==
Prominent PvdA member and former MP Klaas de Vries was put on a very low place on the PvdA list of candidates by the advisory committee, he was unlikely to be elected. After some internal consternation the congress however decided to place him on an eligible place. He was indeed elected

Another prominent candidate was human-rights lawyer Britta Böhler, who stood successfully for GroenLinks.

== Results ==
Result of the Dutch Eerste Kamer election, 2007

Party	2003			2007			+/–	
Party	Votes	%	Seats	Votes	%	Seats	%	Seats
Christian Democratic Appeal	46,848	29.0	23	43,501	26.7	21	−2.2	−2
People's Party for Freedom and Democracy	31,026	19.2	15	31,360	19.2	14	±0.0	−1
Labour Party	40,613	25.1	19	31,032	19.0	14	−6.1	−5
Socialist Party	8,551	5.3	4	25,231	15.5	12	+10.2	+8
ChristianUnion	4,960	3.1	2	9,706	6.0	4	+2.9	+2
GroenLinks	10,866	6.7	5	9,074	5.6	4	−1.1	−1
Reformed Political Party	4,695	2.9	2	3,690	2.3	2	−0.6	±0
Democrats 66	7,087	4.4	3	3,270	2.0	2	−2.4	−1
Party for the Animals	0	0.0	0	3,366	2.1	1	+2.1	+1
Independent Senate Group	2,874	1.8	1	2,857	1.8	1	±0.0	±0
Pim Fortuyn List	4,124	2.6	1	0	0.0	0	−2.6	−1
Total	161,642	100.0	75	163,087	100.0	75	—	—

=== Seat allocation ===
Three combined lists entered the election, the CDA together with the ChristianUnion and the SGP, the VVD together with D66 and the OSF and the GreenLeft together with the PvdD. The plans for a combined list of PvdA/SP/GreenLeft/PvdD failed because of the rising tensions between SP and PvdA.

Two parties profited from the remainder seat allocation, using D'Hondt method, the SP and the CDA. These are therefore slightly overrepresented.

In North Holland one GreenLeft member of the provincial council voted incorrectly: in a panic attack she made all nine boxes of GreenLeft MPs red. This meant that the combined list of the GreenLeft and the Party for the Animals got one seat less, which would otherwise have been allocated in the remainder seat distribution. This seat would have gone to the PvdD.

Five candidates were elected because of preference votes. Düzgün Yildirim for the SP, Hans Engels for D66, Jan Laurier for the GreenLeft, Joyce Sylvester for the CDA and Hans Klein Breteler for the CDA.
