= Kappen =

Kappen is a surname. Notable people with the surname include:

- Frank van Kappen (born 1941), Dutch marine and politician
- Hanneke Kappen (born 1954), Dutch singer and radio and TV presenter
- Joseph Kappen (1941–1990), Welsh serial killer
- Sebastian Kappen (1924–1993), Indian Jesuit priest and liberation theologian
- Tony Kappen (1919–1993), American basketball player
