= Peter van Dijk =

Dutch politician (born 1952)

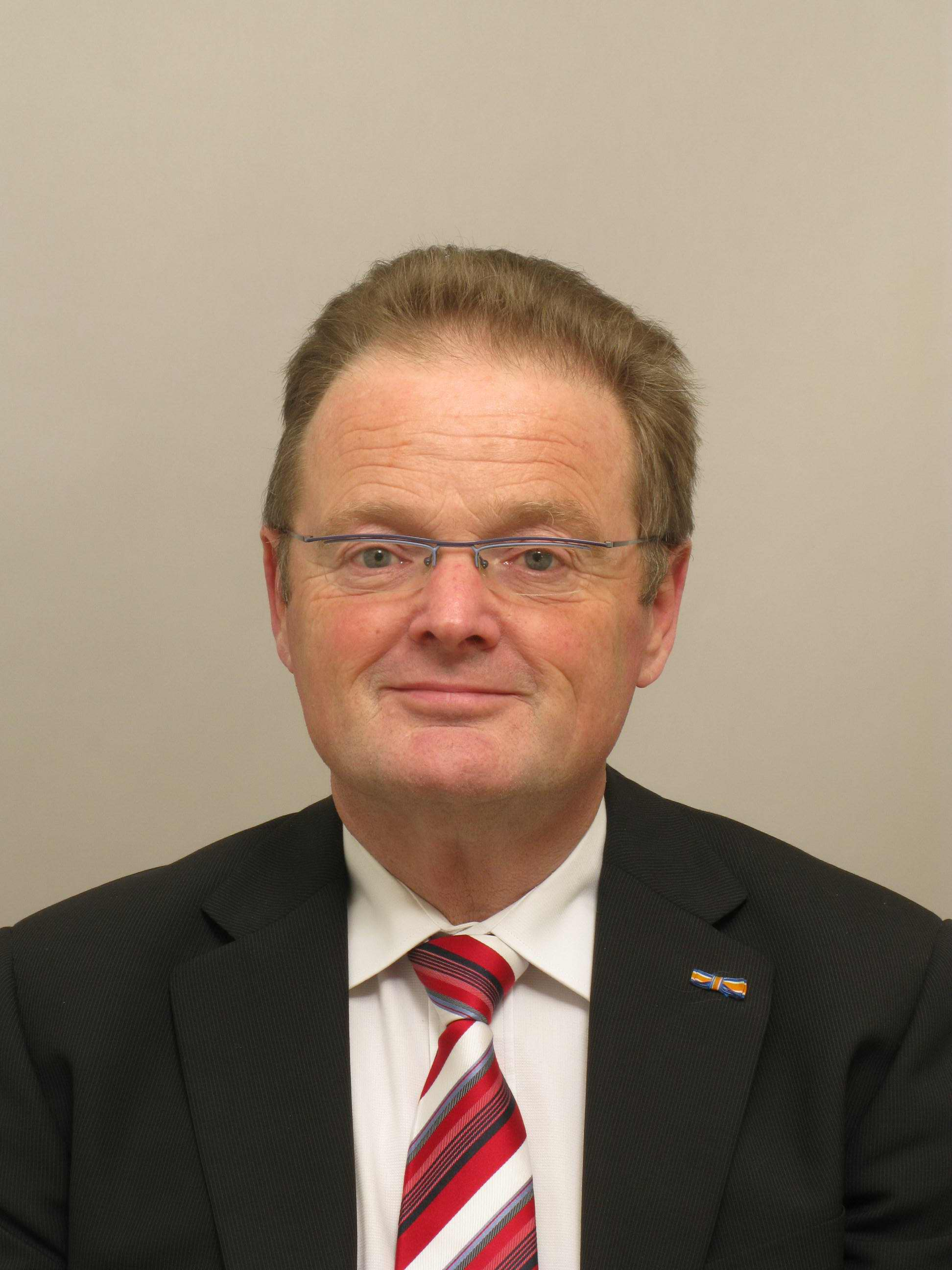

Member of the Senate
- In office 28 March 2017 – 11 June 2019
- In office 8 September 2015 – 29 December 2015
- In office 7 June 2011 – 9 June 2015

Member of the States-Provincial of Zeeland
- In office 10 March 2011 – 28 March 2023

Member of the municipal council of Goes
- In office 20 August 1981 – 1 May 1990

Personal details
- Born: 28 December 1952 (age 73) Goes, Netherlands
- Party: Christian Democratic Appeal (1981–1990), Party for Freedom (2011–2019)

Pieter "Peter" van Dijk (born 28 December 1952) is a Dutch politician, he served three terms in the Senate for the Party for Freedom in the period between 2011 and 2019. He was a member of the States-Provincial of Zeeland between 10 March 2011 and 28 March 2023.

== Life ==
Van Dijk worked as an administrative employee in Vlissingen between 1977 and 1994. He later held jobs as manager, project leader and bus driver. From 1981 to 1990 he served for the Christian Democratic Appeal in the municipal council of Goes. He was made Member of the Order of Orange-Nassau on 11 February 2002.

He was a member of the Senate for the Party for Freedom three times. His first term lasted from 7 June 2011 to 9 June 2015. He served again in the Senate between 8 September 2015 and 29 December 2015 when he replaced Gabriëlle Popken who went on maternity leave. His third time lasted from 28 March 2017 to 11 June 2019. In April 2019 van Dijk fell out with other Party for Freedom officials in Zeeland over financial matter and his style of governance and he was removed from the provincial party. Van Dijk indicated he would press charges of defamation against his former colleagues. He continued as his own party.

== Electoral history ==
Electoral history of Peter van Dijk
Year	Body	Party	Pos.	Votes	Result		Ref.
Year	Body	Party	Pos.	Votes	Party seats	Individual	Ref.
2011	Senate	Party for Freedom	?			Won	
2015	Senate	Party for Freedom	8	0	9	Lost (Note: Van Dijk was appointed to the body later during the term due to a vacancy.)	
2019	Senate	Party for Freedom	6	98 (Note: Weighted votes)	5	Lost	
