= Lucas Hartong =

Dutch politician (born 1963)

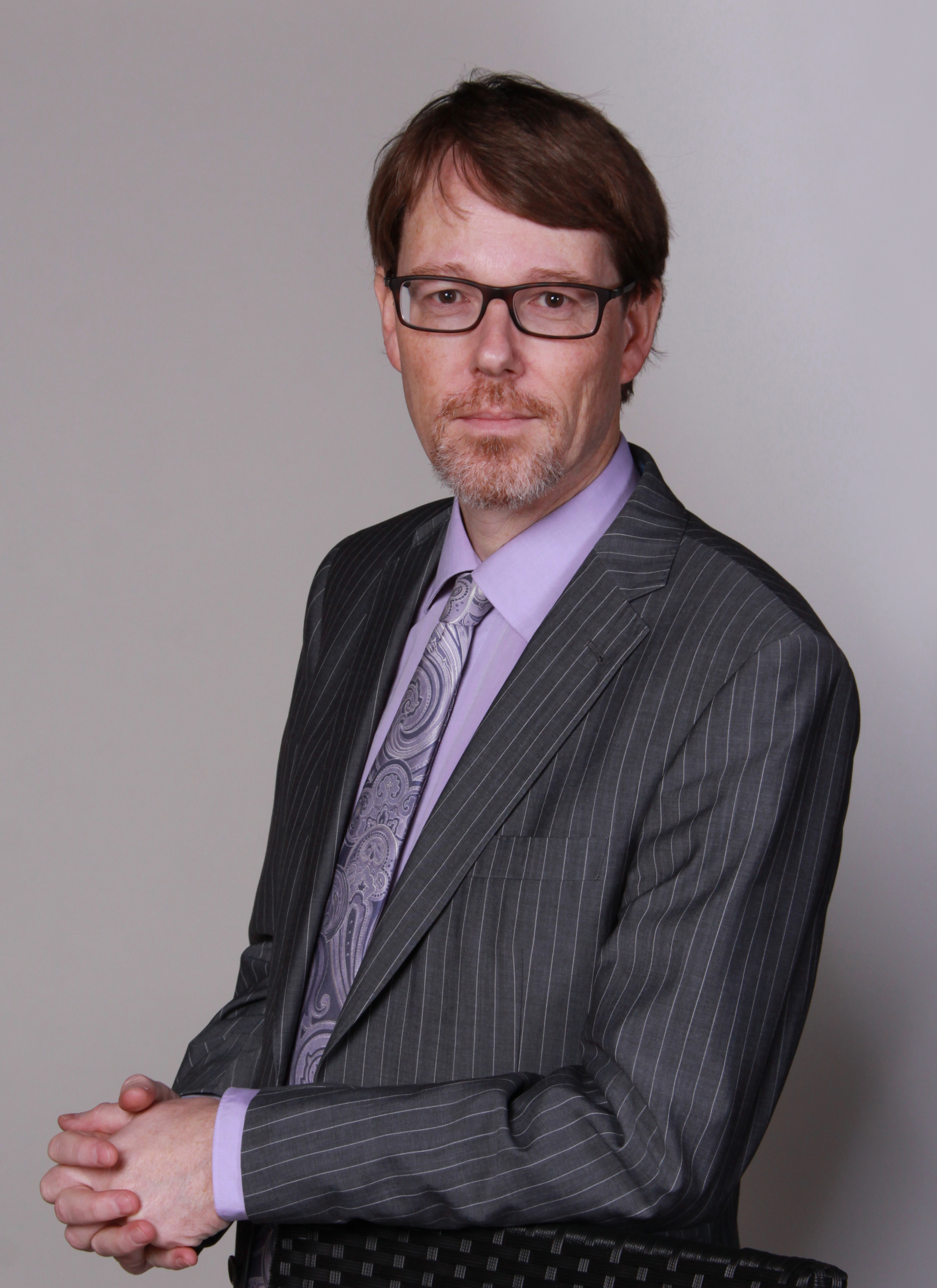

Parliamentary leader of the Party for Freedom in the European Parliament
- In office 24 March 2014 – 1 July 2014
- Preceded by: Laurence Stassen
- Succeeded by: Marcel de Graaff

Member of the European Parliament
- In office 22 June 2010 – 1 July 2014
- Constituency: Netherlands

Personal details
- Born: 24 May 1963 (age 63) Dordrecht, Netherlands
- Party: Party for Freedom; Pim Fortuyn List
- Education: Christelijke Hogeschool Ede

Lucas Hartong (born 24 May 1963) is a Dutch politician. He served as a member of the European Parliament for the Party for Freedom between 22 June 2010 and 1 July 2014. He was leader of the PVV delegation from 24 March to 1 July 2014.

== Early life ==
Hartong was born on 24 May 1963 in Dordrecht. He went to the gymnasium in Breda and he later studied theology at Christelijke Hogeschool Ede and Tilburg University.

== Political career ==
Hartong unsuccessfully tried to win a seat in the municipal council with his own Democratisch Platform Nederland party. He later became a member of the board of the Pim Fortuyn List in South Holland.

He went on to serve as a parliamentary assistant to the Party for Freedom group in the European Parliament. On 22 June 2010 he replaced Louis Bontes, who was chosen as a Member of the House of Representatives of the Netherlands in the 2010 general election. Hartong was supposed to have joined the European Parliament earlier, as the Netherlands, and with it the Party for Freedom, received an extra seat when the European Parliament increased the number of seats. The judicial procedures were however not finished before Hartong was installed to replace Bontes. At the start of his term Hartong said he wished to represent the Christian voters in the European Parliament. He claimed that another concern of him would be fishery, he found it surprising that the Dutch had no seat in the Committee on Fisheries. In 2013 Hartong was critical of the European Parliament paid trips of journalist to the Parliament, with costs of around 700,000 euro in 2011. He saw a relation between pro-EU stories in the media and the paid trips.

His term ended on 1 July 2014. He served amongst others as member of the Committee on Budgets and the Delegation for relations with the United States.

He declined to be on the Party for Freedom candidate list for the European Parliament elections of 2014, citing he did not want to cooperate with "wrong figures" from parties such as the Freedom Party of Austria and the French National Front.
