= Gabriëlle Popken =

Dutch politician (born 1983)

Member of the House of Representatives
- In office 23 March 2017 – 31 March 2018
- In office 20 July 2018 – 31 August 2020

Member of the Senate
- In office 7 June 2011 – 8 September 2015
- In office 29 December 2015 – 23 March 2017

Personal details
- Born: 21 August 1983 (age 42) Geleen, Netherlands
- Party: Party for Freedom (until 2022); Forum for Democracy (since 2022)

Gabriëlle Popken (born 21 August 1983) is a Dutch former politician for the Party for Freedom. She served in the Senate between 2011 and 2017 and subsequently in the House of Representatives between 2017 and 2020.

== Youth and education ==
Popken was born in Geleen on 21 August 1983. Between 2003 and 2007 she studied law at Maastricht University, earning a bachelor's degree. The subsequent year she earned a master's degree in commercial law at the same university.

== Political career ==
She became a parliamentary assistant to Geert Wilders on 4 May 2009. Popken became a member of the Senate for the Party for Freedom on 7 June 2011. Popken took maternity leave per 8 September 2015 and was replaced by Peter van Dijk, it was the first time in the history of the Senate that a senator was replaced due to a maternity leave. She returned to the Senate on 29 December. Popken was elected to the House of Representatives in the 2017 Dutch general election and took up her seat on 23 March 2017. From 31 March 2018 to 20 July 2018 she was on pregnancy and maternity leave and was temporarily replaced by Emiel van Dijk. Popken left the House on 31 August 2020, having already been absent for several months for health reasons. She was succeeded by Sietse Fritsma.

== Personal life ==
Popken is married to fellow politician Marcel de Graaff.

== Electoral history ==
Electoral history of Gabriëlle Popken
Year	Body	Party	Pos.	Votes	Result		Ref.
Year	Body	Party	Pos.	Votes	Party seats	Individual	Ref.
2015	Senate	Party for Freedom	4	238 (Note: Weighted votes)	9	Won	
