= 2011 Dutch Senate election =

- 23 May 2011
- All 75 seats in the Senate; 38 seats needed for a majority
Party	Leader	Vote %	Seats	+/–
VVD	Loek Hermans	20.83	16	+2
PvdA	Marleen Barth	18.11	14	0
CDA	Elco Brinkman	14.61	11	−10
PVV	Machiel de Graaf	13.07	10	New
SP	Tiny Kox	10.35	8	−4
D66	Roger van Boxtel	7.62	5	+3
GL	Tof Thissen	6.48	5	+1
CU	Roel Kuiper	3.44	2	−2
SGP	Gerrit Holdijk	1.57	1	−1
50+	Jan Nagel	1.32	1	New
PvdD	Niko Koffeman	1.31	1	0
OSF	Kees de Lange	1.30	1	0
This lists parties that won seats. See the complete results below.
President of the Senate before	President of the Senate after
René van der Linden; CDA	Fred de Graaf; VVD

Elections of the Dutch Senate were held on 23 May 2011, following the provincial elections on 2 March 2011. The 566 members of the twelve States-Provincial elected the 75 Senate members. The new Senate was installed on 7 June 2011. The term ended on 8 June 2015.

== Participating parties ==
No.	Party	Top candidate
1	Christian Democratic Appeal	Elco Brinkman
2	People's Party for Freedom and Democracy	Loek Hermans
3	Labour Party	Marleen Barth
4	GroenLinks	Tof Thissen
5	Socialist Party	Tiny Kox
6	Democrats 66	Roger van Boxtel
7	ChristianUnion	Roel Kuiper
8	Reformed Political Party	Gerrit Holdijk
9	Independent Senate Group	Kees de Lange
10	Party for the Animals	Niko Koffeman
11	Party for Freedom	Machiel de Graaf
12	50PLUS	Jan Nagel
13	Koornstra List	Ruud Koornstra

== Vote weights ==
The provinces have different population sizes, so the members of the States-Provincial cast weighted votes, to ensure that each vote represents the same number of people. The weight is determined by dividing the population of the province by the number of seats in the States of that province. This number is divided by 100 and rounded.

Province	Seats	Population	Vote weight
South Holland	55	3,527,449	641
North Holland	55	2,691,426	489
North Brabant	55	2,453,936	446
Gelderland	55	2,005,298	365
Utrecht	47	1,228,579	261
Overijssel	47	1,134,434	241
Limburg	47	1,122,631	239
Friesland	43	647,280	151
Groningen	43	579,034	135
Drenthe	41	491,342	120
Flevoland	39	391,988	101
Zeeland	39	381,582	98

== Result ==
Result of the Dutch Eerste Kamer election, 2011

Party	2007	2011	difference
People's Party for Freedom and Democracy (VVD)	14	16	+2
Labour Party (PvdA)	14	14	0
Christian Democratic Appeal (CDA)	21	11	−10
Party for Freedom (PVV)	0	10	+10
Socialist Party (SP)	12	8 *	−4
Democrats 66 (D66)	2	5 *	+3
GroenLinks (GL)	4	5	+1
ChristianUnion (CU)	4	2	−2
Reformed Political Party (SGP)	2	1	−1
50PLUS (50+)	0	1	+1
Party for the Animals (PvdD)	1	1	0
Independent Senate Group (OSF)	1	1	0
Total	75	75	0

The coalition parties VVD and CDA and their supporting party, the PVV, won 37 seats in this election, one short of an overall majority. However, the coalition-friendly SGP won the last needed seat, and it is expected that the SGP will help the cabinet in obtaining a majority on most issues.

- * Democrats 66 missed a seat and the Socialist Party gained one due to a mistake of North Holland States-Provincial member Wim Cool, who voted with a blue writing device instead of the prescribed red one.
