= Sietse Fritsma =

Dutch politician and civil servant

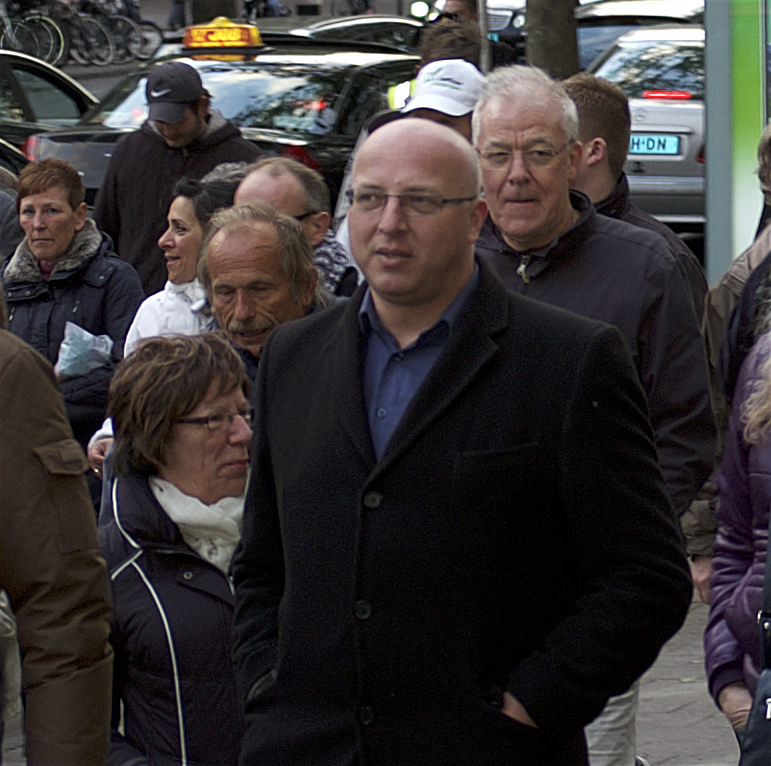

Member of the House of Representatives
- In office 1 September 2020 – 5 December 2023
- In office 30 November 2006 – 31 October 2019

Personal details
- Born: Sietse Rindert Fritsma; 31 March 1972 (age 54) Franeker, Netherlands
- Party: Party for Freedom
- Education: University of Groningen (M.A., Spatial science)
- Occupation: Politician, civil servant
- Website: (in Dutch) Party for Freedom website

Sietse Rindert Fritsma (born 31 March 1972) is a Dutch politician and former civil servant. As a member of the Party for Freedom (Partij voor de Vrijheid) he has been a member of the House of Representatives since 1 September 2020. He previously served in the House between 30 November 2006 and 31 October 2019. He focuses on matters of social affairs, employment, political asylum and immigration. From March 2010 till January 2011 he was also a member and PVV fraction leader of the municipal council of The Hague.

He previously worked for the Dutch Immigration and Naturalisation Service (IND).

Fritsma studied human geography at the University of Groningen. He obtained a master's degree in spatial science, specializing in regional geography of developing countries. Around 1990 he lived for a year in an Israeli kibbutz.

== Electoral history ==
Electoral history of Sietse Fritsma
Year	Body	Party	Pos.	Votes	Result		Ref.
Year	Body	Party	Pos.	Votes	Party seats	Individual	Ref.
2021	House of Representatives	Party for Freedom	11	264	17	Won	
