= Tobias Reynaers =

Dutch politician

Member of the Senate
- In office 7 June 2011 – 9 June 2015

Personal details
- Born: 23 May 1982 (age 43) Bergen op Zoom, Netherlands
- Party: Party for Freedom

T.P.A.M. "Tobias" Reynaers (born 23 May 1982) is a former Dutch politician.

Reynaers was a member of the Senate for the Party for Freedom (PVV) between 7 June 2011 and 9 June 2015. He was also a member of the Benelux Parliament. Previously, he was a municipal councillor in Roosendaal for a local party between 2010 and 2011.

Reynaers studied law at Tilburg University between 2000 and 2006. Since 2006 he has been working as a lawyer in Roosendaal.
