= Mariëtte Frijters-Klijnen =

Dutch politician (born 1953)

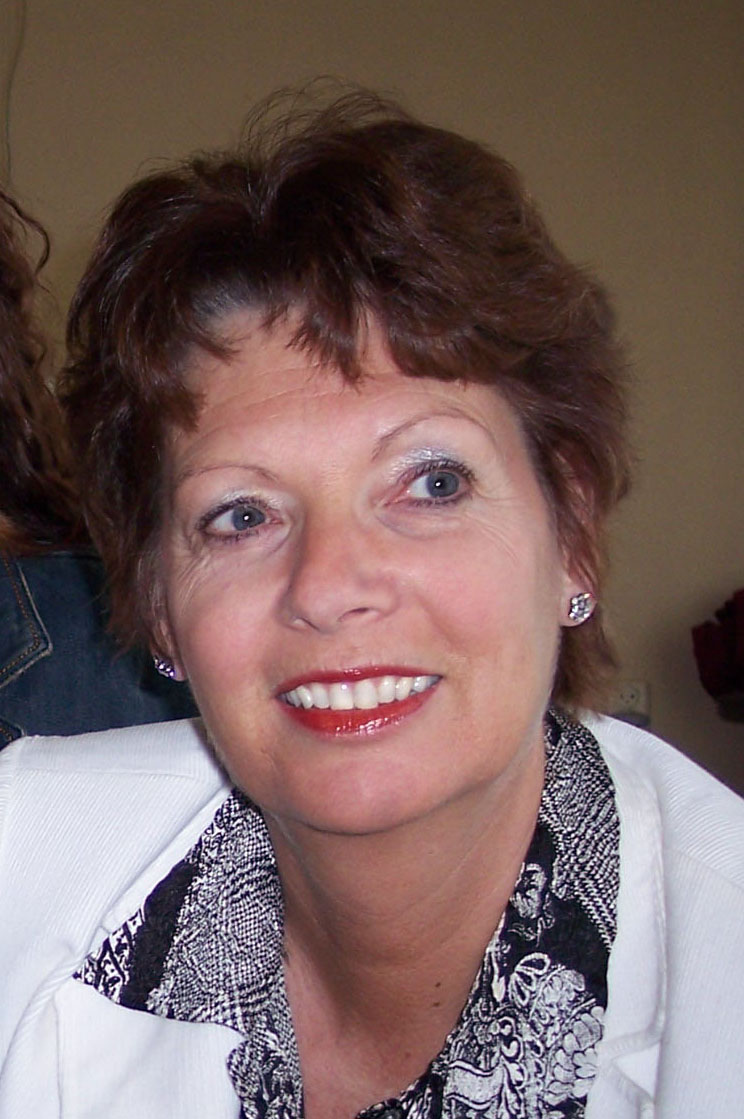

Member of the Senate
- In office 7 June 2011 – 9 June 2015

Member of the States-Provincial of North Brabant
- In office 10 March 2011 – 26 March 2015

Personal details
- Born: 23 April 1953 (age 73) Best, Netherlands
- Party: Party for Freedom

Mariëtte Frijters-Klijnen (born 23 April 1953) is a Dutch politician, she was member of the Senate for the Party for Freedom between 7 June 2011 and 9 June 2015. She was member of the States-Provincial of North Brabant between 10 March 2011 and 26 March 2015.

Frijters-Klijnen previously worked as a dietician between 1977 and 1978. Between 1993 and 1999 she worked at local tourist information centers in Oldenzaal and De Lutte. She studied law at the Open University between 1999 and 2009.
