= Geert Reuten =

Dutch economist and politician (1946–2025)

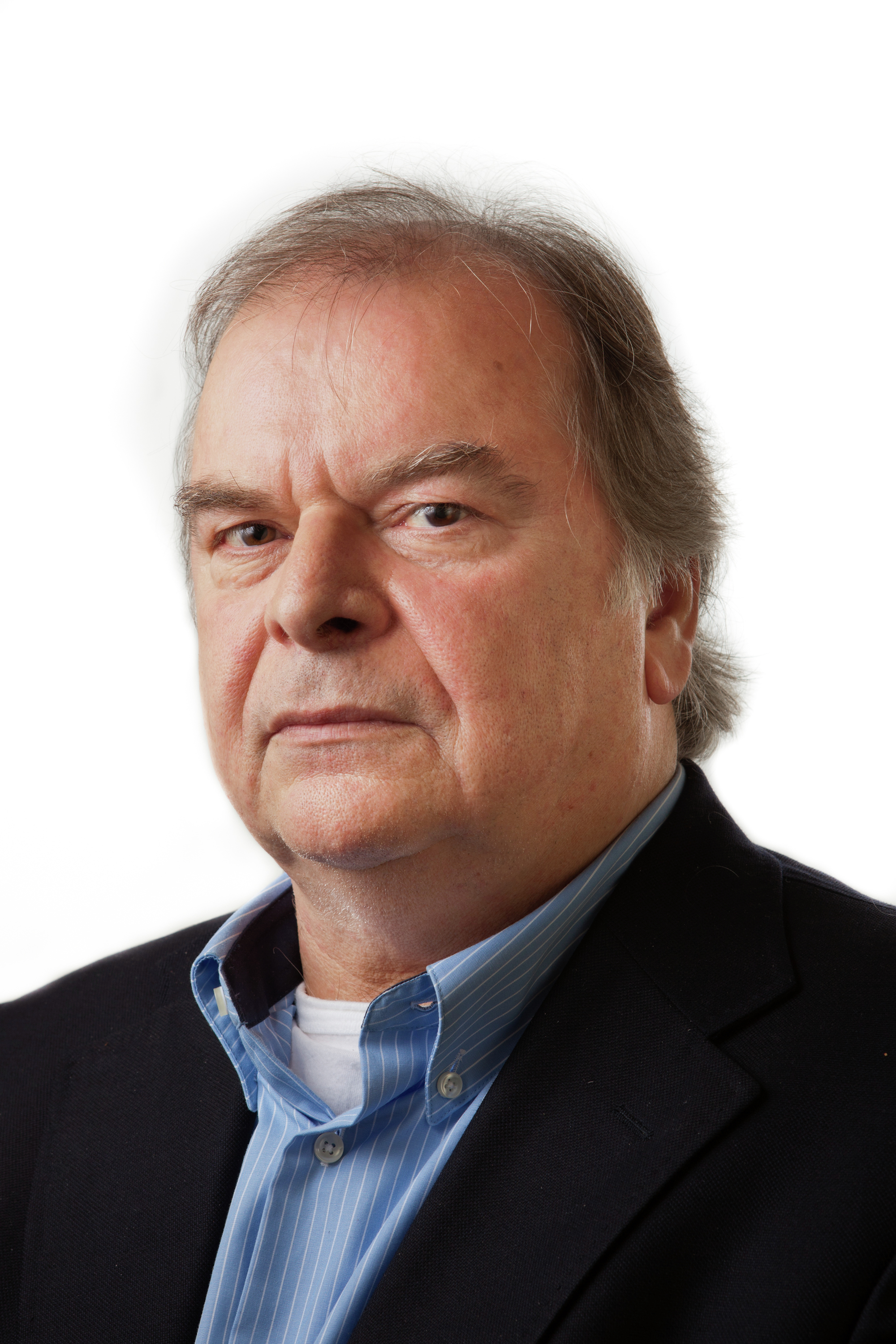
Geert Reuten

Thaddeus Antonius Gerardus Maria "Geert" Reuten (16 April 1946 – 29 July 2025) was a Dutch economist and politician. On behalf of the Socialist Party (SP) he was a senator in the First Chamber (upper house) of the Dutch parliament from June 2007 till June 2015 and again from 26 June 2018 to 11 June 2019. Reuten also taught economics at the University of Amsterdam, and was internationally recognized as an expert on Marx and Hegel.

== Life and career ==
Reuten was born in Heerlen on 16 April 1946. He studied economics and sociological economics at Erasmus University Rotterdam and at Birkbeck College of the University of London. Reuten graduated in 1988 at the University of Amsterdam (UvA). From 1977, he was lecturer and later professor at the UvA. From 2002 to 2014, he was director of the Master of Economics at the same university. His prominent work The Capitalist System is now also used as a textbook in University of Amsterdam for advanced BSc and MSc courses.

He joined the Socialist Party and served as the party's economic adviser in the House from that year. In the first election in 2007 he was elected to the Senate. He was sworn in on 12 June 2007. His term ended on 9 June 2015. Reuten was also active in the alter-association Association for the Taxation of Financial Transactions for the Aid of Citizens, ATTAC.

Reuten died on 29 July 2025 in Westhoek, at the age of 79.

== Works ==
- The Value-Form Determination of Economic Policy: A Dialectical Theory of Economy, Society and State in the Capitalist Epoch (with Michael J. Williams), Amsterdam: B.R. Grüner, 1988
- Value-Form and the State: The Tendencies of Accumulation and the Determination of Economic Policy in Capitalist Society (with Michael J. Williams), London: Routledge, 1989, ISBN 0415038936
- The Unity of the Capitalist Economy and State: A Systematic-Dialectical Exposition of the Capitalist System, Leiden: Brill, 2019, ISBN 978-90-04-39280-9
- Design of a Worker Cooperatives Society: An Alternative Beyond Capitalism and Socialism, and the Transition Towards It, Leiden: Brill, 2023, ISBN 978-90-04-53108-6
- Essays on Marx's Capital: Summaries, Appreciations and Reconstructions, Leiden: Brill, 2024, ISBN 978-90-04-69792-8

== Sources ==
- Amsterdam School of Economics - Dr Geert Reuten
- (in Dutch) Parlement.com biography
