= Sybe Schaap =

Dutch politician

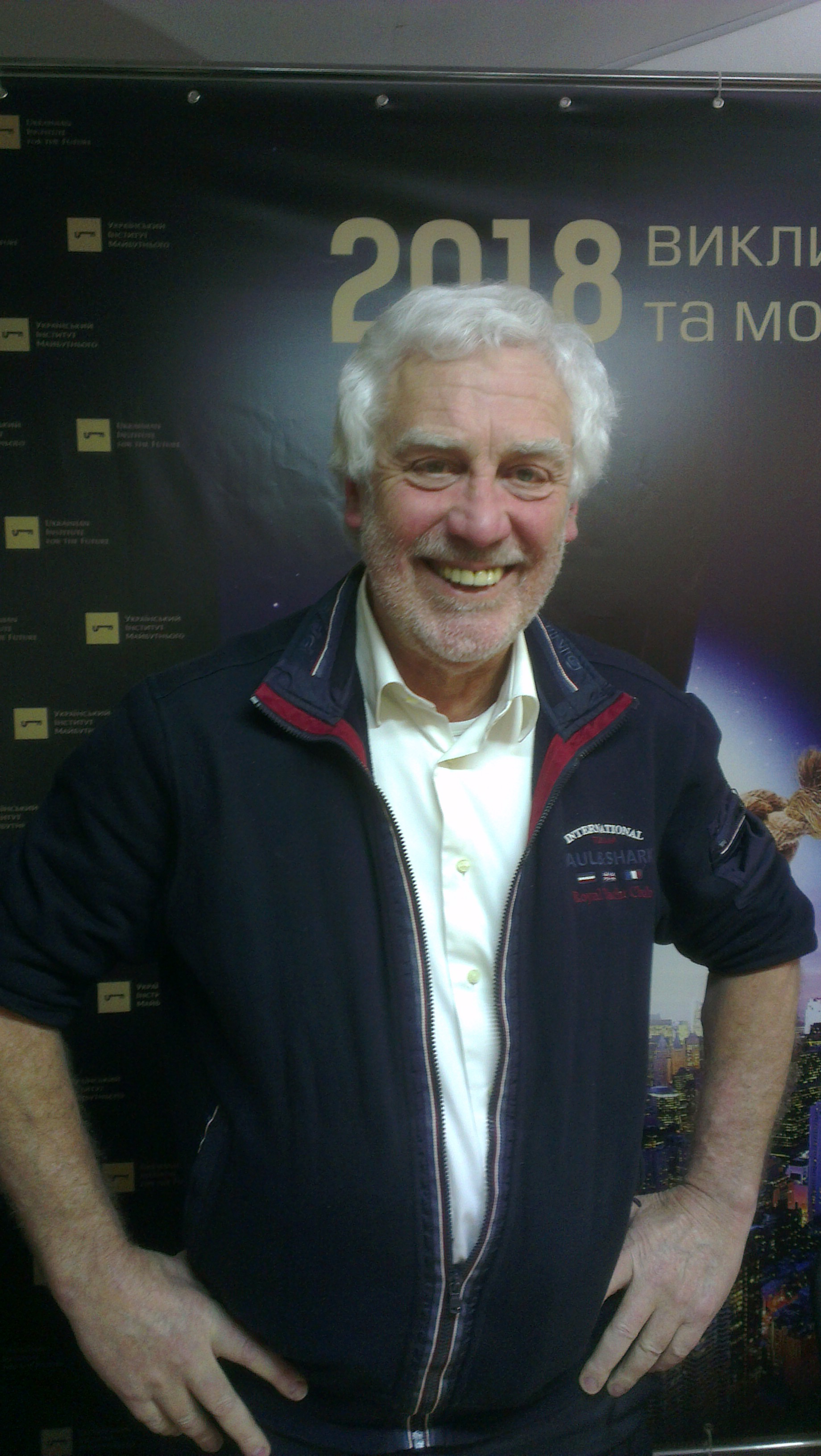

Member of Senate
- In office 12 July 2007 – 11 July 2019

Chairman of Committee of Genetical Modification
- Incumbent
- Assumed office 2014

Chairman of Netherlands Water Partnership
- In office 2010–2019

Personal details
- Born: Sybe Schaap; 20 May 1946 Lemmer
- Party: People's Party for Freedom and Democracy
- Education: Vrije Universiteit Amsterdam
- Occupation: Politician civil servant

Sybe Schaap (born 20 May 1946) is a Dutch politician of the People's Party for Freedom and Democracy. He has been Senator from 12 July 2007 to 11 July 2019, doing water, agriculture, foreign affairs and European Union affairs. For example, he arranged a majority in favor of the Ukraine–European Union Association Agreement in the Dutch parliament.

== Biography ==
He is a son of a farmer from the Friesland. His father worked as a ‘pioneer’ in one of our new ‘polders’, reclaimed from the sea between 1935 and 1948. In 1948 his family one of the first to start a farm there, specialized in the propagation of seed potatoes.

His first education was agriculture and economy. After his father died, Sybe took over the farm for a few years, before stopping farming.

Later he studied social science and philosophy. Then he wrote dissertation in Amsterdam – Vrije Universiteit Amsterdam (1979) and habilitation in Charles University.

Essential for his philosophical development were ‘underground’ lectures in Prague, organized by dissidents of Charta 77.

In Czechoslovakia he also developed his love for the eastern part of Europe, what brought him also to Ukraine from 1992.

By incident he was elected as a chairman of one of the Dutch water authorities and later on to president of the Association of water authorities, which started his ‘water career’ and brought him all over the world as an advisor (included Ukraine). At the end he was appointed as a professor in water policy at the universities of Delft and Wageningen.

Nowadays he gives philosophical lectures on many locations (Amsterdam, Prague, Delft, Wageningen, Kyiv etc.

=== Education ===
- 1964 – High school.
- 1967 – Agricultural College in Leeuwarden.
- 1969 – Economical College in Zwolle.
- 1973 – VU Amsterdam (social science).
- 1995 – dissertation in VU Amsterdam (Doctorate Philosophy).
- 2002 – Habilitation Philosophy in Prague.

=== Career ===
- 1968–2003 – Farmer and seed potato propagation in Netherlands and Ukraine.
- 1981–2002 – Research consultant in international agricultural sector.
- 1982 – 2012 – Lecturer. Philosophy, Free University Amsterdam.
- Since 1992 – Lecturer. Philosophy, Charles University Prague.
- 2003 – 2010 – President of Dutch Association of Water authorities.
- 2007 – 2019 – Senator.
- 2012 – 2017 – Member of Advisory Committee Water for the Dutch Government.
- Since 2014 – Chairman of Commission of Genetical Modification (advisory committee of the Dutch government on all developments in biogenetics).
- 2010 – 2019 – Chairman of Netherlands Water Partnership.
- 2010–2013 – Professor of Water policy & Governance in Technical University Delft.
- 2010–2013 – Professor of Water policy & Governance in Wageningen University.

=== Main philosophical articles ===
- Bedreigd bestaan; het landbouwbeleid en de positie van de boer (The Hague 1983) – Critical study on corporatism in the Dutch agriculture sector.
- Theodor Adorno; in verzet tegen het totale kwaad (2001) – On ethics and metaphysics in the philosophy of Th. Adorno.
- Pleidooi voor het betrekkelijke (2006) – Against absolutism in philosophy.
- J. Habermas; zelfbehoud en zelfconstitutie (1984) – Study on Habermas utopian philosophy.
- De wederopkomst van het fascisme (1989) – Against the idea that fascism is returning in a classical way.
- Lefort en het postmodernisme (2018) – Claude Lefort's political philosophy, applied to postmodernism.
- De nachtwaker ontslagen (2006) – On fundamental changes in the Dutch constitutional state.
- Nut en noodzaak van een correspondentie (2004) – On the correspondence of Nietzsche.
- Herstel burgerschap in ere (2017) – On the value of citizenship in postmodern times.
- De maakbaarheid voorbij (2009) – On centralism and decentralisation in Dutch politics.
- Van burger naar mens (2019) – How civil rights loose meaning and change into human rights.

== Other facts ==
Notable resident of Lemmer.
