= Henk Beckers =

Dutch politician (1944–2026)

Member of the Senate of the Netherlands
- In office 7 June 2011 – 9 June 2015

Personal details
- Born: Henricus Gerardus Josephus Maria Beckers; 30 May 1944 Mheer, German-occupied Netherlands
- Died: 4 May 2026 (aged 81)
- Party: VVD
- Education: Catholic University of Nijmegen (Mr.)
- Occupation: Notary

Henricus Gerardus Josephus Maria "Henk" Beckers (30 May 1944 – 4 May 2026) was a Dutch politician. A member of the People's Party for Freedom and Democracy, he served in the Senate from 2011 to 2015.

Beckers died on 4 May 2026, at the age of 81.
