= Joyce Sylvester =

Dutch politician

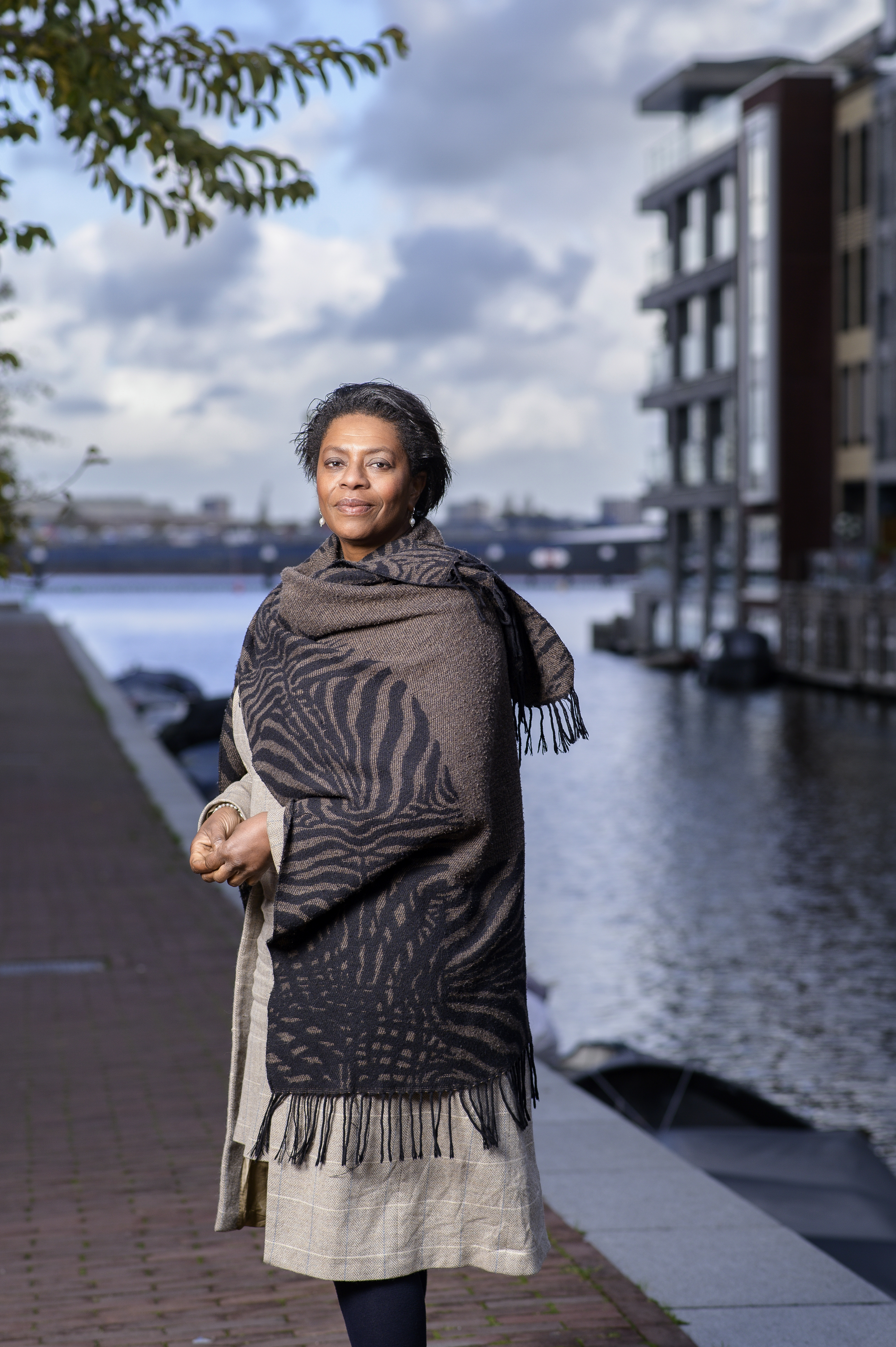

Member of the Senate
- In office 10 June 2003 – 9 June 2015

Personal details
- Born: Joyce Juanita Sylvester; 19 September 1965 (age 61) Amsterdam, Netherlands
- Party: Labour Party
- Education: Utrecht University; University of Amsterdam; Free University in Amsterdam
- Website: www.joycesylvester.nl

Joyce Juanita Sylvester (born 19 September 1965) is a Dutch politician and administrator. A member of the Labour Party (PvdA), she served as a member of the Senate from 2003 to 2015.

== Early life and career ==
Sylvester was born in Amsterdam, and she was raised in a family with 3 sisters. Her parents had emigrated from Suriname to the Netherlands early 60s. Her mother was managing caretaker of the Amsterdam mayoral residence. After completing her secondary education, Sylvester studied communication and information management at Utrecht University and political science at the University of Amsterdam, graduating in 1991. While studying, she worked as a sports journalist for the newspaper Het Parool. Following her graduation, she worked as financial policy officer at the Dutch Ministry of Transport and as a civil servant for the municipality of Amsterdam. She obtained her PhD in 2000 from the faculty of law of the VU University of Amsterdam with a doctoral dissertation on privatization of government services. She worked in the private sector afterwards.

== Public service ==
In 2003 Sylvester was elected to the Senate, representing the Labour Party. In the Senate, her focus was on finance, economic affairs, culture, and agriculture. In the senate elections of 2007, she kept her seat due to her preference votes. In 2011 she was in ninth place on the party list and was re-elected. As senator she acted as secretary of the Labour Party parliamentary group, chair of the Senate Committee on Social Affairs and Welfare, and deputy chair of the Senate Committee on Foreign Affairs and General Affairs. Her term ended in 2015.

From October 1, 2008 to May 31, 2009 she served as acting mayor of Anna Paulowna, replacing Arnoud-Jan Pennink. Joyce Sylvester was the first black woman in the Netherlands taking on this role. In September 2009 Sylvester was appointed as acting mayor of the Naarden, serving until its amalgamation to the new municipality Gooise Meren in January 2016. Sylvester became deputy National Ombudsman the following month, and she appeared on de Volkskrant's list of most influential Dutch people in late 2019. In 2022, she started serving as chairwoman of the Amstel, Gooi en Vecht water authority, and she was appointed chairwoman of the State Commission against Discrimination and Racism. Sylvester cited several comments by members of the Schoof cabinet to argue that it was increasing the risk of government discrimination.

Sylvester holds various other positions. She is, inter alia, chairperson of the board of trustees of the Foundation Early Music Utrecht, member of the supervisory board of the “Stedelijk Museum” of Amsterdam and chairperson of the Foundation of Cooperating Relief Agencies, which in the Netherlands is known by its colloquial name Giro555.

== Publications ==
Joyce Sylvester wrote several books:

- Joyce Sylvester, "De praktijk van privatisering: dissertatie" (2000)
- Joyce Sylvester i.s.m. Jan Jurriens, "Strategievorming van verzelfstandigde organisaties" (2001)
- H.J. de Ru, J.A.F Peters, J.J. Sylvester, "Monografieën Overheid en Markt, De Wet markt en overheid, beschouwingen over een omstreden wetsvoorstel", (2003), SDU Uitgevers BV, Den Haag, ISBN 9054093609
