= Marleen Barth =

Dutch politician (born 1964)

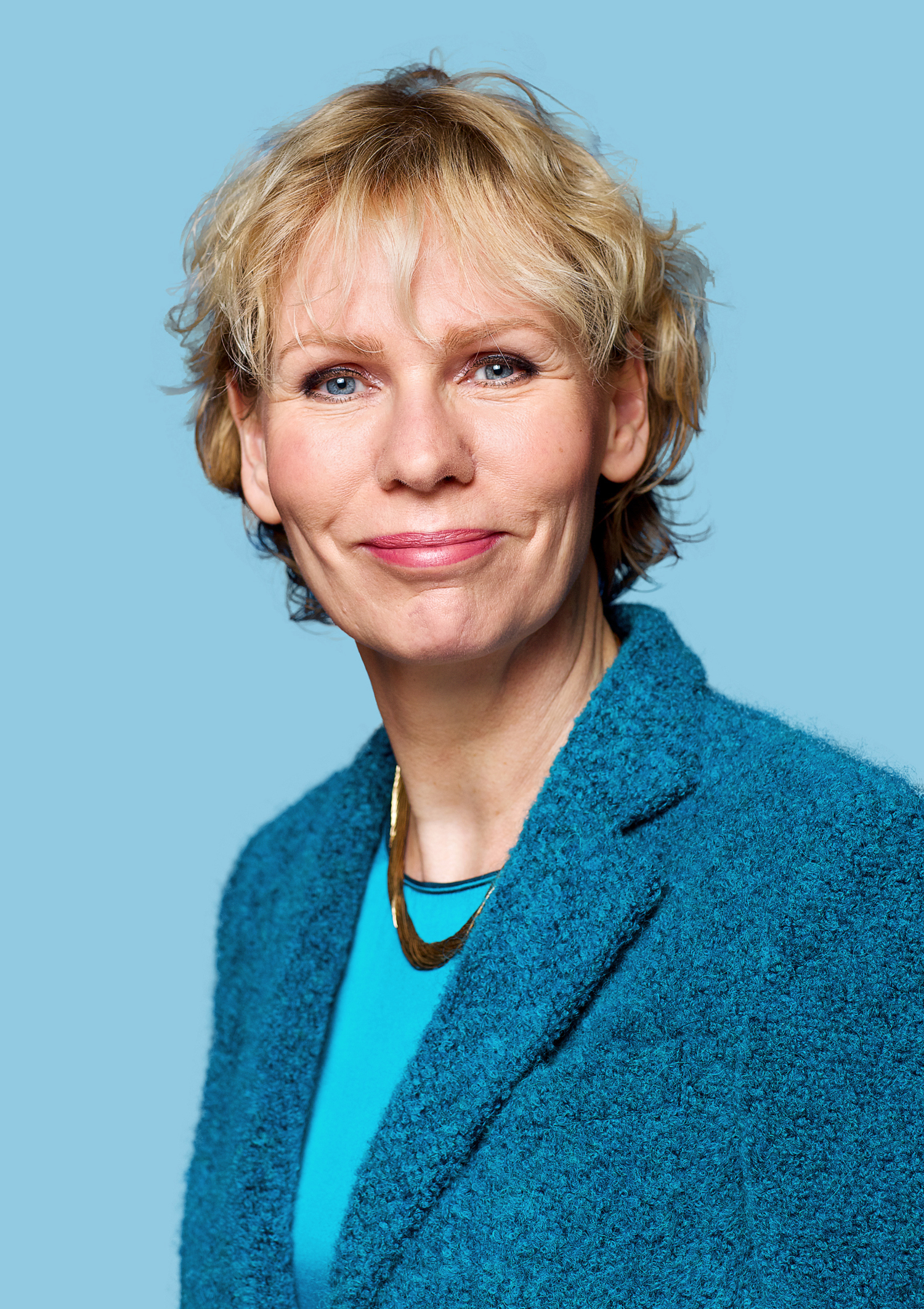
- Marleen Barth in 2015

Labour Party leader in the Senate
- In office 7 June 2011 – 8 February 2018
- Preceded by: Han Noten
- Succeeded by: André Postema

Member of the Senate
- In office 7 June 2011 – 8 February 2018

Member of the House of Representatives
- In office 19 May 1998 – 23 May 2002

Personal details
- Born: Magdalena Antoinette Maria Barth; 21 March 1964 (age 62) Den Helder, Netherlands
- Party: Labour Party
- Spouse: Jan Hoekema
- Education: University of Amsterdam (M.A., political science)
- Occupation: Politician, trade union leader, journalist

Magdalena Antoinette Maria 'Marleen' Barth (born 21 March 1964) is a Dutch politician of the Labour Party (PvdA) and trade unionist, and a former journalist.

== Early life and education ==
Magdalena Antoinette Maria Barth was born on 21 March 1964 in Den Helder in the Netherlands.

Barth studied political science with a speciality in public administration at the University of Amsterdam.

== Career ==
Barth worked as a parliamentary reporter for Trouw (1990–1997), was a member of the House of Representatives (1998–2002), a member of the Provincial Council of North Holland (2003–2004), and chair of the Education Union of the Christian National Trade Union Federation (2005–2008). She was chair of the Dutch Association of Mental Health and Addiction Care from 2008 to 2013.

She was lead candidate for the Labour Party in the 2011 and 2015 Senate elections. From 7 June 2011, she was a member of the Senate as well as Senate group leader of the Labour Party. She stepped down as member of the Senate on 8 February 2018, after a controversy about her vacation during a Senate debate.

== Personal life ==
Marleen Barth is married to former D66 MP Jan Hoekema, (second marriage for both) who has been mayor of Wassenaar from 2007 to 2017.

Party political offices
Preceded by Han Noten	Labour Party leader in the Senate; 2011–2018	Succeeded by André Postema
