= Heleen Dupuis =

Dutch politician (born 1945)

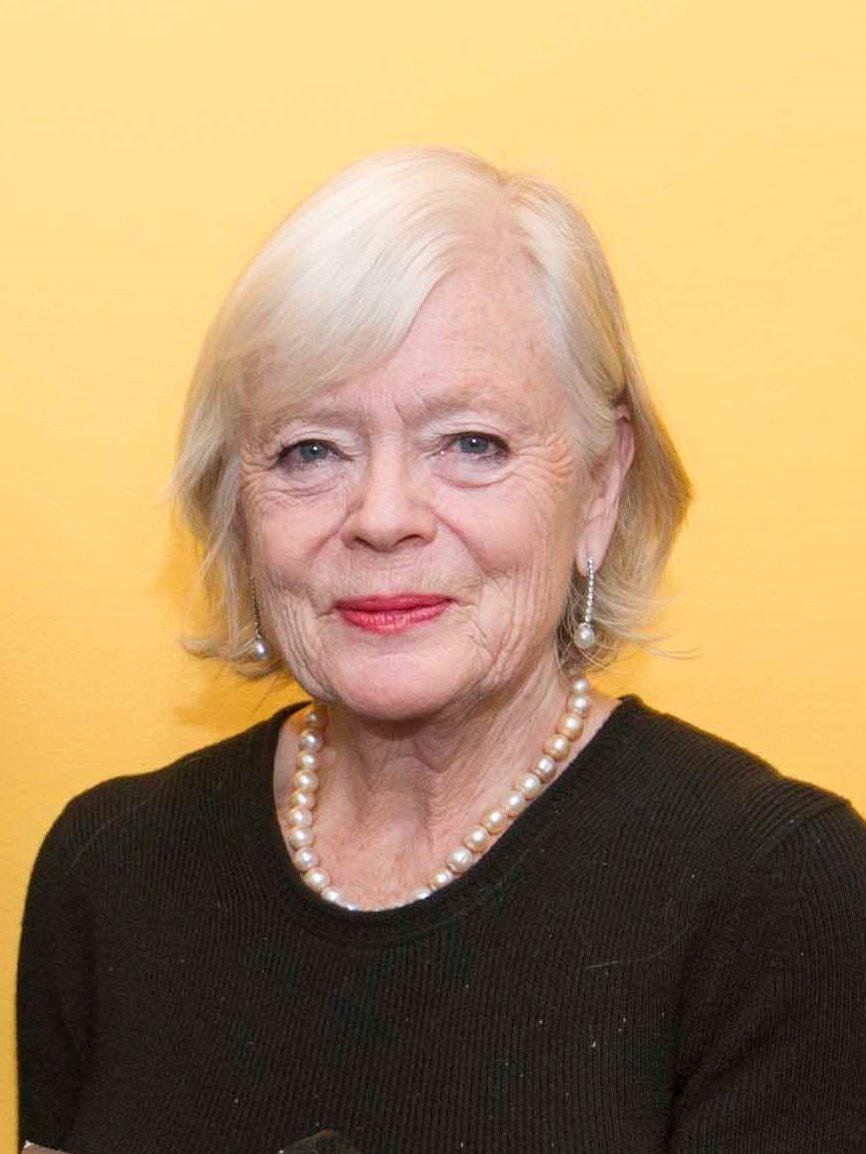

Member of the Dutch Senate
- In office 8 June 1999 – 9 June 2015

Personal details
- Born: 30 May 1945 (age 81) Rotterdam, Netherlands
- Party: People's Party for Freedom and Democracy

Heleen Margriet Dupuis (born 30 May 1945) is a Dutch ethicist, professor, and politician who served in the Senate from 1999 to 2015 as part of the People's Party for Freedom and Democracy (VVD). Her father was a doctor with a practice out of her hometown of Rotterdam. She began her professional career as a part-time teacher and professor in the 1970s. From there, she worked in the ethics department at Leiden University. She was chairman of the Dutch Voluntary Euthanasia Association from 1981 to 1985, and has also was chairman of the Alzheimer's Council of the Netherlands; she cites the death of her first husband from dementia in her support of voluntary euthanasia.

After her time as chair, Dupuis became a professor of medicine and ethics at Leiden University beginning in 1986. In 1991, her title changed to Professor of Medical Ethics, a position she served at alongside her political career until 2003, when she became professor emeritus. Dupuis's political career began in 1999 when she was named to the Senate as a member of the VVD. She was vice-chair of the Senate from 2007 to 2011. Her focuses as a Senator were on public healthcare and higher education, in particular wanting the budget moved from healthcare to education, as well as a focus on stricter ethics in medicine. She was a Senator until 2015, when the VVD lost three seats, including hers; she worked in an advisory role in healthcare insurance discussions after leaving the Senate.
