= Marcel de Graaff =

Dutch politician (born 1962)

Marcel de Graaff MEP
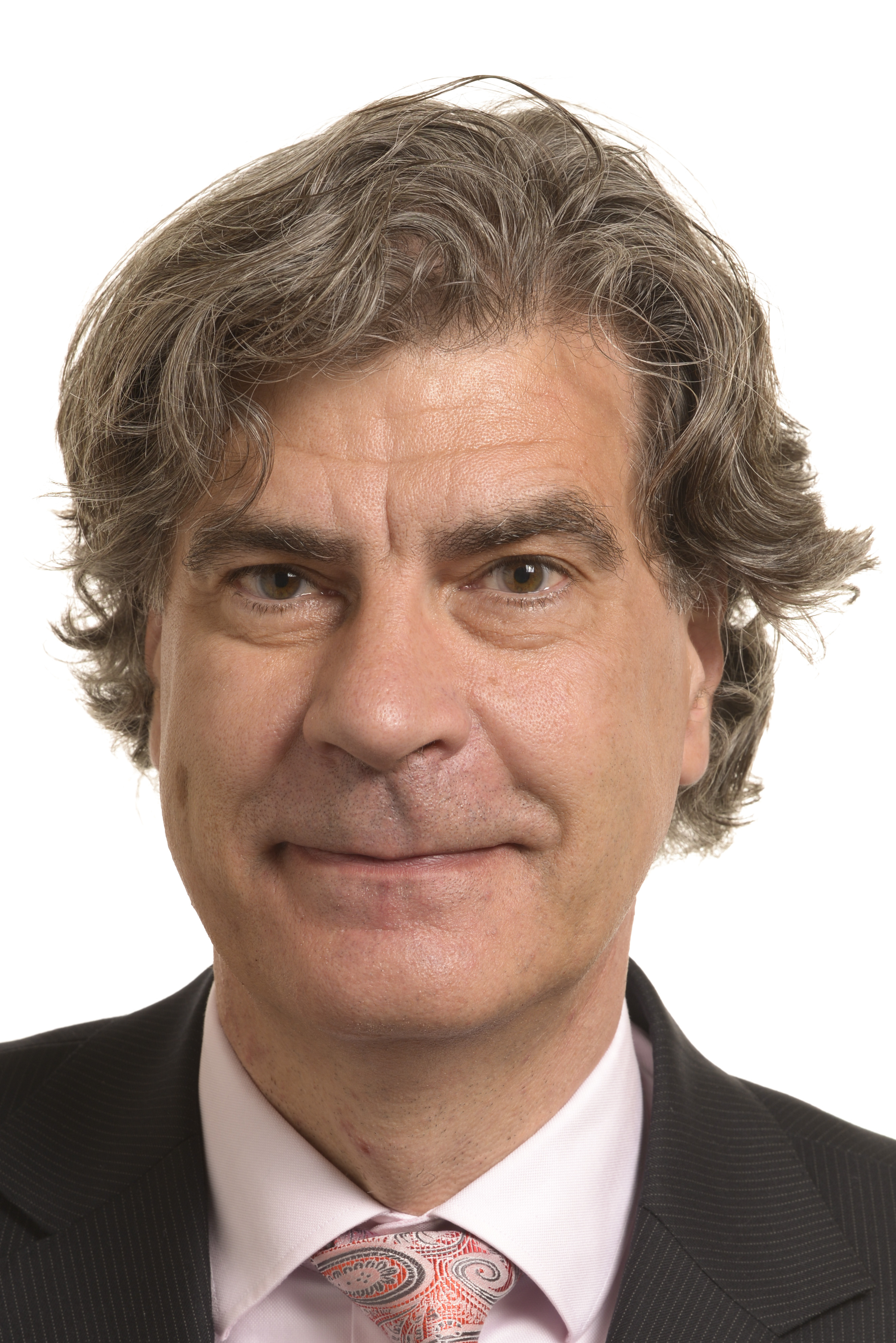

Member of the European Parliament
- In office 1 February 2020 – 15 July 2024
- In office 1 July 2014 – 1 July 2019
- Constituency: Netherlands

Chair of Europe of Nations and Freedom
- In office 15 June 2015 – 1 July 2019 Serving with Marine Le Pen, Nicolas Bay
- Preceded by: Position established

Parliamentary leader of the Party for Freedom in the European Parliament
- In office 1 July 2014 – 1 July 2019
- Preceded by: Lucas Hartong

Parliamentary Leader of the Party for Freedom in the Senate
- In office 25 September 2012 – 10 June 2014
- Preceded by: Machiel de Graaf
- Succeeded by: Marjolein Faber

Member of the Senate of the Netherlands
- In office 7 June 2011 – 1 July 2014

Personal details
- Born: M.J.R.L. de Graaff; 7 April 1962 (age 64) Rotterdam, Netherlands
- Party: Forum for Democracy (2022–present)
- Other political affiliations: Party for Freedom (2011–2022)
- Education: Radboud University Nijmegen

M.J.R.L. "Marcel" de Graaff (Dutch: [mɑrˈsɛl də ˈɣraːf]; born 7 April 1962) is a Dutch politician. He was a member of the Senate of the Netherlands for the Party for Freedom (PVV) from 2011 to 2014. He served as a Member of the European Parliament (MEP) for the Netherlands in the periods 2014–2019 and 2020–2024. He was co-president of the Europe of Nations and Freedom, and he switched party affiliation to Forum for Democracy in his second term.

== Early life and career ==
Marcel de Graaff was born on 7 April 1962 in Rotterdam. De Graaff studied theology at the Radboud University Nijmegen between 1981 and 1988.

De Graaff worked as a consultant for IT & Operations from 1 August 1989. He was a teacher of religion at a secondary school in Rotterdam from 1 January 2010 until 1 July 2010. He also was a manager for KPN telecommunications company.

== Political career ==
De Graaff was a member of the Senate of the Netherlands representing the Party for Freedom from 7 June 2011 until 1 July 2014. He was parliamentary group leader of the PVV in the Senate from 25 September 2012 until 10 June 2014.

De Graaff was the top candidate of the PVV for the 2014 European Parliament elections. He became Member of the European Parliament for the Netherlands per 1 July 2014. He has also become the parliamentary group leader of the PVV in the European Parliament since the beginning of his term as an MEP.

In 2015, far-right MEPs founded the Europe of Nations and Freedom group. Marine Le Pen and De Graaff have been its first co-presidents since 15 June 2015. On 28 October 2015, De Graaff voted multiple times for Le Pen in her absence, which is against the European Parliament's rules. Parliament president Martin Schulz withheld € 1,530 in allowances as a punitive measure.

De Graaff was the PVV leader for the 2019 European Parliament election. The party did not obtain any seats in the election. His term in the European Parliament ended on 1 July 2019. In February 2020 it was announced that because of Brexit the PVV would obtain a seat in the European Parliament, which was assigned to De Graaff. He was appointed per 1 February 2020.

=== Forum for Democracy ===
In 2022, he defected to Thierry Baudet's Forum for Democracy (FvD) party after expressing support for its more hardline stance against the COVID-19 vaccine and criticising the PVV's pro-vaccine policies. He was suspended from Identity and Democracy later that year, and he decided to leave the group on 22 October due to their differing stances towards Russia. He became a Non-Inscrit member of European Parliament.

De Graaff was one of 16 MEPs who voted against condemning President Daniel Ortega of Nicaragua for human rights violations, in particular the arrest of Bishop Rolando Álvarez. He had also been one of 13 MEPs who voted against condemning the Russian invasion of Ukraine. Nederlands Dagblad noted that De Graaff copied President Vladimir Putin's rhetoric in defense of the war. In a March 2024 debate in the European Parliament, he lauded Russia's sheltering of Ukrainians, and he claimed without evidence that Ukraine had been responsible for bombing hundreds of thousands of children and for supplying children for pedophile rings and organ trade. The home and office of one of De Graaff's assistants was raided in May 2024 by Belgian and French authorities, respectively, in an investigation into Russian interference in European politics. The Czech government had discovered earlier that MEPs had received payments for repeating Russian talking points through the online publication Voice of Europe.

De Graaff was planning to run for another term in the June 2024 European Parliament election in Belgium's Dutch-speaking electoral college. However, the Flanders chapter of Forum for Democracy, which had been founded in January 2024, did not manage to collect the required 5,000 signatures to participate. De Graaff's second term ended on 15 July 2024.

== Personal life ==
De Graaff is a Roman Catholic and lives in Rotterdam. He is married to fellow politician Gabriëlle Popken.

== Electoral history ==
Electoral history of Marcel de Graaff
Year	Body	Party	Pos.	Votes	Result		Ref.
Year	Body	Party	Pos.	Votes	Party seats	Individual	Ref.
2012	House of Representatives	Party for Freedom	48	157	15	Lost	
2014	European Parliament	Party for Freedom	1		4	Won	
2019	European Parliament	Party for Freedom	1			Lost	
2023	Senate	Forum for Democracy	13			Lost	
2023	House of Representatives	Forum for Democracy	45	71	3	Lost	
