= Jannette Beuving =

Dutch politician (born 1965)

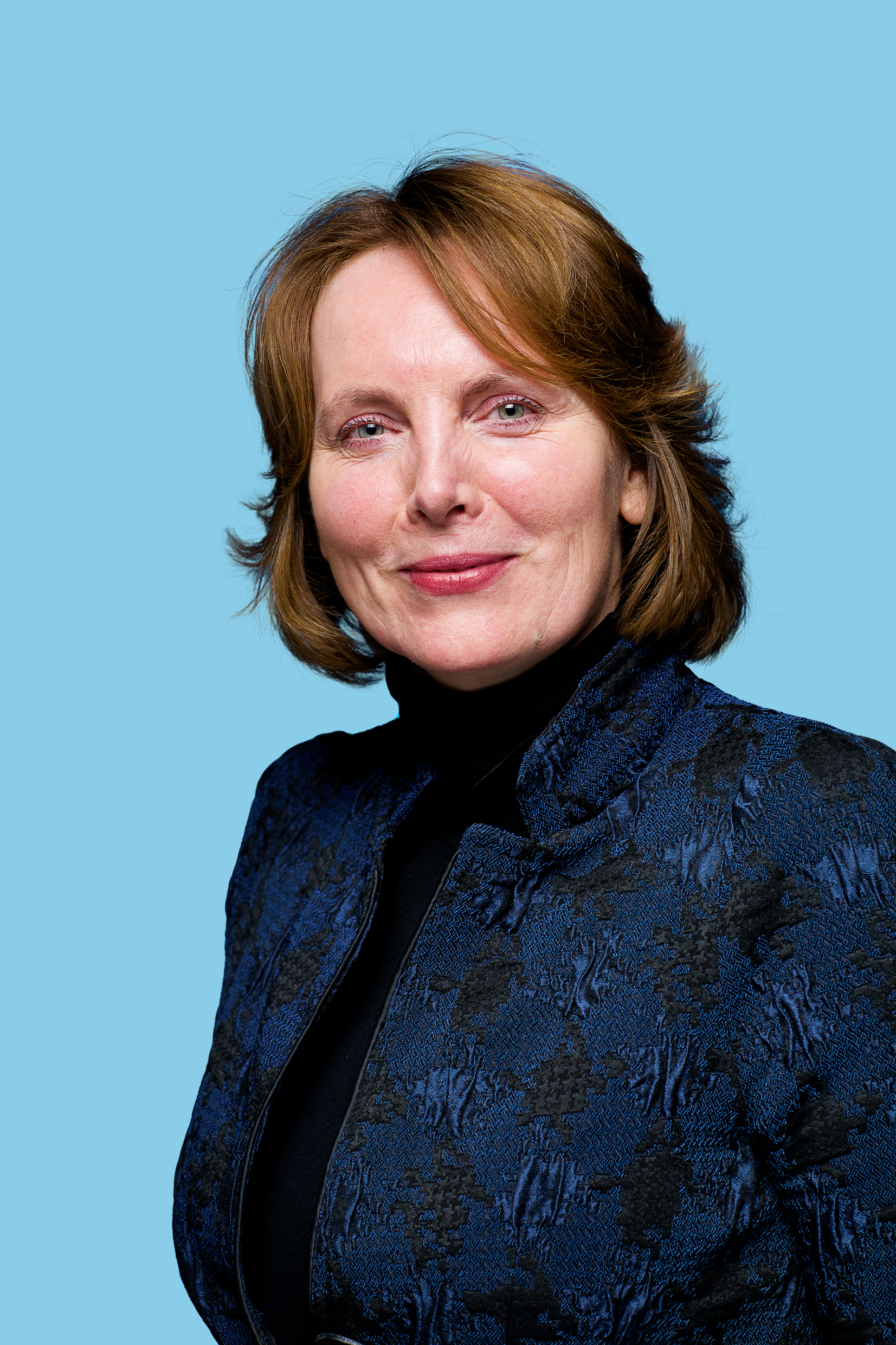
- Janette Beuving in 2015

Member of the Senate
- In office 7 June 2011 – 28 March 2018

Personal details
- Born: 20 June 1965 (age 60) Hardenberg, Netherlands
- Party: Labour Party

Jannette Beuving (born 20 June 1965) is a Dutch lawyer, judge, university professor, and politician. She is a member of the Labour Party and has been a member of the Senate from 7 June 2011 to 28 March 2018.
