= Frank van Kappen =

Dutch politician and soldier

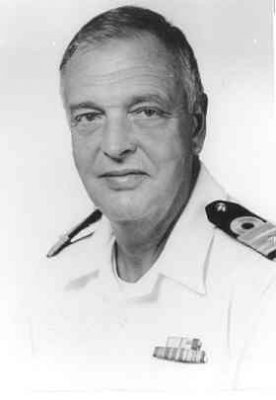
- Frank van Kappen as Brigadier general

Member of the Senate
- In office 12 June 2007 – 11 June 2019

Personal details
- Born: 4 August 1941 (age 83); Semarang, Dutch East Indies
- Political party: People's Party for Freedom and Democracy

Franklin Ernest "Frank" van Kappen (born 4 August 1941) is a Dutch retired marine and politician. Van Kappen was a career officer in the Netherlands Marine Corps, and served as Major general between 1995 and 1998. He was a member of the Senate for the People's Party for Freedom and Democracy between 2007 and 2019.

== Career ==
Van Kappen was born on 4 August 1941 in Semarang, Dutch East Indies. He received his primary education in the Dutch East Indies, the Netherlands and New Guinea. Between 1955 and 1961 he was enrolled in the Dalton Lyceum in The Hague.

The same year he finished highschool he entered the Royal Naval College in Den Helder. Graduating as an officer in 1964 he subsequently served with the Netherlands Marine Corps. Between 1987 and 1988 he attended Naval War College in the United States. Between July 1992 and 1995 he served as brigadier general as commanding officer of the Dutch Armed Forces in the Caribbean, concurrently holding command of the Dutch-American Taskforce 4.4. He was promoted to Major general and served as military advisor to the Secretary General of the United Nations between 1995 and August 1998.

Since 2000 he has been a visiting lecturer at the Netherlands Institute of International Relations Clingendael.

== Senate ==
In 1999 Van Kappen became member of the People's Party for Freedom and Democracy and he joined the Senate for that party on 12 June 2007.

In 2009 there was widespread political debate on the continuation of the Dutch military presence in the Afghan province of Uruzgan in the Task Force Uruzgan for 2010. Van Kappen proposed that the Netherlands would continue its military presence, however leave the lead position to another country.

Between 2011 and 2015 he was President of the Senate's Permanent Commission on Foreign Affairs, Defence and Development Aid.

Shortly after the 17 July 2014 downing of Malaysia Airlines Flight 17 in Eastern Ukraine, the option of sending military commando forces to retrieve the victims was proposed by several politicians because the flight had a majority of Dutch passengers and cooperation with local power holders was difficult. Van Kappen stated that the sending of Dutch forces would be one of the most stupid courses of action.

In early 2018 Van Kappen pleaded for a long-term plan for the armed forces of the Netherlands, a plan with broad political support which would could be sustained over several cabinets. During the 2018 Dutch municipal elections Van Kappen was lijstduwer for his party in Utrechtse Heuvelrug. His term in the Senate ended on 11 June 2019.

== Awards ==
In July 1982 Van Kappen was invested as a Knight of the Order of Orange-Nassau; on 8 June 1995 he was elevated as an Officer of the same order.

He received the medal of Naval Almirante Luis Brion of Venezuela on 23 July 1993. Venezuela also awarded him the Order of Naval Merit, first class on 7 July 1995. The United States presented him with the Legion of Merit in December 1996.
