= Machiel de Graaf =

Dutch politician (born 1969)

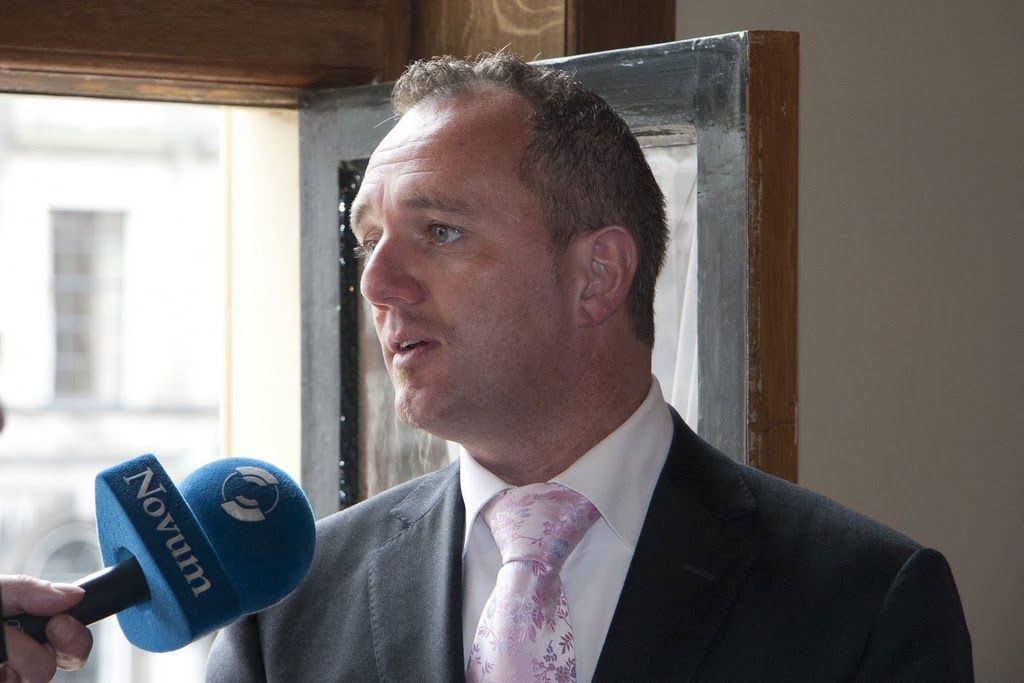

Member of the House of Representatives of the Netherlands
- In office 20 September 2012 – 5 December 2023

Senate leader - Party for Freedom Senate of the Netherlands
- In office 7 June 2011 – 19 September 2012

Member of the Senate
- In office 7 June 2011 – 19 September 2012

Personal details
- Born: Machiel de Graaf; 26 June 1969 (age 57) Scheveningen, Netherlands
- Party: Forum for Democracy (2025–present)
- Other political affiliations: PVV (2009–2023)
- Education: University of Applied Sciences Leiden (BSc, Physical therapy)
- Occupation: Politician; sales manager; physical therapist
- Website: (in Dutch) Official website

Machiel de Graaf (Dutch pronunciation: [maːˈxil də ˈɣraːf]; born 26 June 1969) is a Dutch politician and physical therapist. As a member of the Party for Freedom (PVV) he was a member of the Senate as well as Senate group leader from 7 June 2011 to 20 September 2012. He has been an MP since 20 September 2012. He has already been a PVV member of the municipal council of The Hague since 11 March 2010 as well as fraction leader since 20 January 2011.

De Graaf origins from a family of fishermen of Scheveningen. Educated as a physiotherapist, he worked in this branch from 1995 to 1999 and as a salesmanager in the pharmaceutical industry from 1999 to 2008. Since 15 November 2010 he has been working for the parliamentary group of the PVV.

== Electoral history ==
Electoral history of Machiel de Graaf
Year	Body	Party	Pos.	Votes	Result		Ref.
Year	Body	Party	Pos.	Votes	Party seats	Individual	Ref.
2010	House of Representatives	Party for Freedom	42	61	24	Lost	
2012	House of Representatives	Party for Freedom	15	376	15	Won	
2017	House of Representatives	Party for Freedom	11	619	20	Won	
2021	House of Representatives	Party for Freedom	14	515	17	Won	
2025	House of Representatives	Forum for Democracy	43	54	7	Lost	
