= Tof Thissen =

Dutch politician

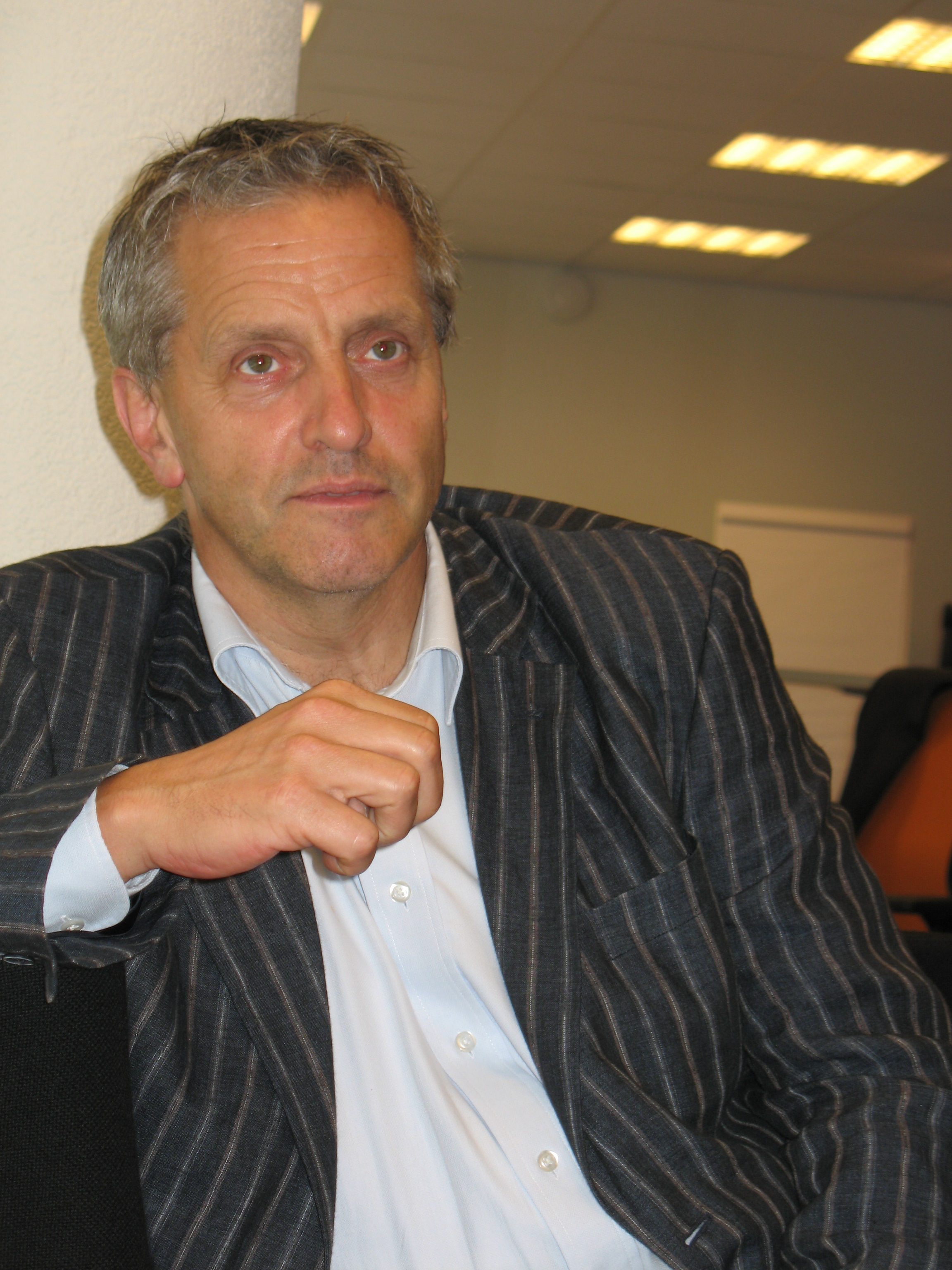

GreenLeft chair of the parliamentary party in the Senate
- In office 2007–2015
- Preceded by: Diana de Wolff

Personal details
- Born: Christoffel Paul Thissen; 19 May 1957 (age 68) Roermond, Netherlands
- Party: GreenLeft

Christoffel Paul (Tof) Thissen (born 19 May 1957 in Roermond) is a Dutch politician. Between 2004 and 2015 he was member of the Senate for GreenLeft.

== Life before politics ==
Thissen attended a Roman Catholic primary school in Roermond. Between 1969 and 1976 he attended the gymnasium at the Episcopal college in the same city. He graduated specializing in arts. Between 1976 and 1977 he was a member of the centre-left Labour Party. In 1977 however he switched to the more leftwing Pacifist Socialist Party. Betwedeen 1977 and 1982 he studied theology at the Higher School for Theology and Pastoral Studies in Heerlen. He reached his kandidaats examen (roughly equivalent to a Bachelor of Arts). Between and after his study he worked at the Limburg Centre for Development Cooperation. Between 1979 and 1985 he also was the Limburg provincial coordinator for peace activities and member of the national working group for local peace groups of the oecumenical Christian pacifist Interkerkelijk Vredesberaad. After his study Thissen worked as an RE teacher at a secondary school. In this period he was chair of the Roermond PSP between 1982 and 1986.

== Roermond politics ==
Between 1986 and 2002 Thissen was a member of the Roermond city council. First for Roermond Left, an alliance the PSP and the progressive Christian Political Party of Radicals and later for GreenLeft, formed by a merger of the two parties merged. Between 1987 and 1990 he returned to studying theology, now at the Catholic University Nijmegen. Thissen specialized in the ethics of the economy. He did however not finish he studies. In addition to his study Thissen also taught civics at a high school. Thissen was very active in the Roermond social movements and civil society. He served as a member of the board of Roermond branch of Stichting Vluchtelingenwerk, a foundation that helps refugees between 1987 and 1991. He also chaired the Roermond Anti-Discriminationbureau in 1988. In addition he was treasurer of the foundation Roermond Festival, between 1989 and 1994 and he chaired the board of the Roermond Cultural Youth Centre "De Azijnfabriek". He was also active in GreenLeft. Between 1989 and 1994 as member of the Limburg provincial board and between 1989 and 1992 as a member of the GreenLeft national party council.

In 1992 worked as coordinator of a Roermond labour market reintegrationprogram for young people and after that was the director of the Roermond Recycling Centre. In 1994 he became alderman in Roermond, where managed the portfolios welfare, social security, education, culture and youth. As alderman he had a range of secondary functions in regional social affairs. Since 1998 he was a member of the delegation Association of Netherlands Municipalities with the ministry of Social Affairs and Employment. He also had some national secondary functions in the social sphere. He for instance chaired the national council for the project Heel de Buurt, which worked on urban renewal. He also became chairman of the board of Divosa, the national association of managers in the sphere of labour, income and care. Since 2001 he was suppleant of the Council for Work and Income. In 1998, 2002 and 2003 he was a member of the GreenLeft selection committee for the national elections.

== Senate ==
In 2003 Thissen was candidate for the Senate he received a sixth place on the list. In the elections the party only received five seats. In 2004 Mirjam de Rijk left the Senate to become general director of the environmental organization Stichting Natuur en Milieu. Thissen replaced her. In the Senate, Thissen was active on the portfolios education, finance and health care. In 2007 the GreenLeft Congress made Thissen lijsttrekker for the Senate elections. He beat Yolan Koster-Dreese by a wide margin. His term in the Senate ended on 9 June 2015.
