= Niko Koffeman =

Dutch politician (born 1958)

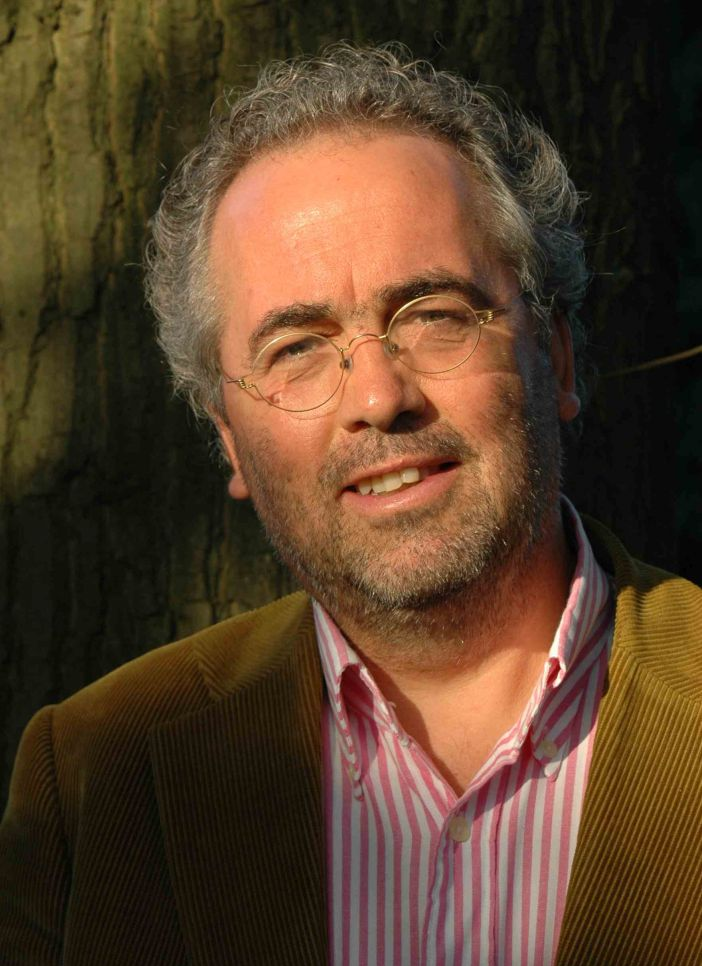

Member of the Senate
- Incumbent
- Assumed office 12 June 2007

Personal details
- Born: Nico Klaas Koffeman; 12 May 1958 (age 68) Maassluis, Netherlands
- Party: Independent (since 2025)
- Other political affiliations: SP (1996–2006); PvdD (2002–2025)
- Spouse: Antoinette Hertsenberg
- Children: 3
- Education: Erasmus University Rotterdam
- Occupation: Teacher • Politician

Nico Klaas "Niko" Koffeman (born 12 May 1958) is a Dutch politician and animal rights activist. A Party for the Animals member, he holds a seat and is his party's leader in the Senate since 12 June 2007.

== Career ==
Born in Maassluis, Koffeman worked for several years as a campaign strategist for the Socialist Party. Among his accomplishments was the creation of their current logo. In addition to his political work, he has been active in several animal rights organizations. He has also worked as a broadcast director. He later played a key role in the creation of the Party for Animals. He is a eurosceptic. He left the Party for the Animals in October 2025, ahead of a general election, saying he disagreed with the party's direction.

== Personal ==
Koffeman is married to television presenter Antoinette Hertsenberg. They are members of the Seventh-day Adventist Church. He is a vegetarian.

== See also ==
- List of animal rights advocates
