= Party for Freedom =

Political party in the Netherlands

Party for Freedom Partij voor de Vrijheid
- Abbreviation: PVV
- Leader: Geert Wilders
- Leader in the House of Representatives: Geert Wilders
- Leader in the Senate: Alexander van Hattem
- Leader in the European Parliament: Marieke Ehlers
- Founded: 22 February 2006; 20 years ago
- Split from: People's Party for Freedom and Democracy
- Membership (2025): 1 (Geert Wilders)
- Ideology: Nationalism; Right-wing populism; Euroscepticism
- Political position: Far-right
- European affiliation: Patriots.eu
- European Parliament group: Patriots for Europe (since 2024) (Note: The party was formerly part of Europe of Nations and Freedom (2015–2019) and Identity and Democracy (2020–2022).)
- Colours: Navy blue Silver
- House of Representatives: 19 / 150
- Senate: 4 / 75
- Provincial councils: 34 / 570
- European Parliament: 6 / 31
- Benelux Parliament: 4 / 21

Website
- pvv.nl

The Party for Freedom (Dutch: Partij voor de Vrijheid [pɑrˈtɛi voːr də ˈvrɛiɦɛit]; PVV) is a right-wing populist and far-right political party in the Netherlands. Geert Wilders is the founder, party leader, and sole registered member of the party. PVV's main issues are migration and critique of Islam. The PVV has proposed banning the Quran and shutting down all mosques in the Netherlands. The party is Eurosceptic and favoured withdrawal from the EU until 2024.

Founded in 2006 as the successor to Wilders' one-man group in the House of Representatives, it obtained nine seats in the 2006 general election. In the 2010 general election, it obtained 24 seats, making it the third-largest party. At that time, the PVV agreed to provide confidence and supply to the minority first Rutte cabinet. PVV withdrew its support in April 2012 due to differences over budget cuts. In the following 2012 general election, it lost nine seats. Following the election, the party returned to the opposition until 2023. In the 2023 general election, it obtained 37 seats and became the largest party in the House of Representatives. After the election, it entered government for the first time as part of the Schoof cabinet. In 2025, the party withdrew from the cabinet and lost 11 seats in the subsequent election.

== History ==
=== Group Wilders (2004–2005) ===
The party's origins trace back to Geert Wilders' departure from the People's Party for Freedom and Democracy (VVD) in September 2004. The immediate cause was Wilders' opposition to the potential accession of Turkey to the European Union, though more broadly, he had become increasingly radicalized. Following his departure, he continued in parliament as a one-man group, Groep Wilders (Group Wilders).

Wilders was joined by Bart Jan Spruyt of the Edmund Burke Foundation, with both aiming to establish a conservative party. Wilders published a manifesto titled Independence Declaration (Dutch: Onafhankelijkheidsverklaring), primarily authored by Spruyt. Initially, they had planned to release it jointly with Pim Fortuyn List politicians Joost Eerdmans and Marco Pastors, but Wilders ultimately withdrew from the collaboration. Spruyt left the party in August 2006, after determining that Wilders was less focused on forming a conservative party and more concentrated on issues related to Islam and immigration.

=== Growth (2006–2010) ===
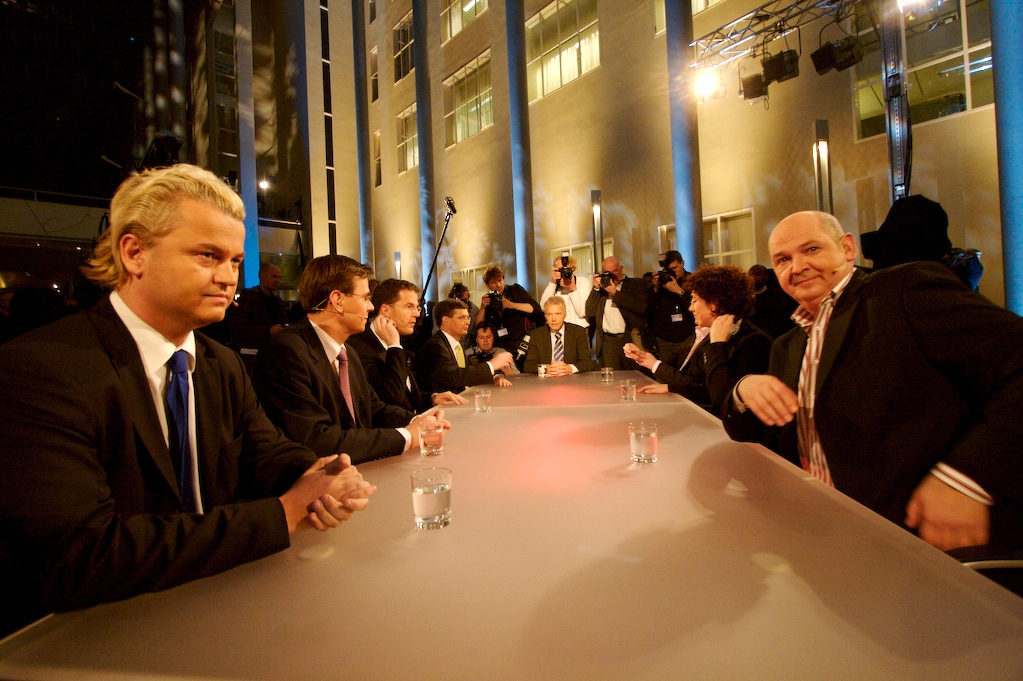
Geert Wilders (left) with other politicians at the final television debate before the 2006 Dutch general election

Wilders' party had for a long time polled low in polls, despite some media attention. Wilders' leading role in the campaign against the European Constitution, which was rejected by Dutch voters by 62%, led to a rise. In the run-up to the 2006 general election, Wilders founded the Party for Freedom. The campaign focused on Islam, with Wilders warning of a "tsunami of Islamization". Despite low polling, the party won 9 seats. The seats were taken by the "old nine": Wilders, Fleur Agema, Raymond de Roon, Hero Brinkman, Martin Bosma, Dion Graus, Barry Madlener, Teun van Dijck and Sietse Fritsma.

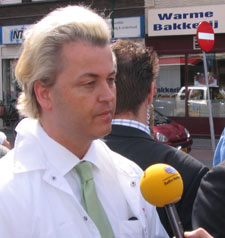
Geert Wilders in 2007

On 28 November 2007, Wilders announced his film, Fitna, suggesting it would include scenes of burning the Quran. The Dutch government, the European Union, and other international organizations feared a repeat of the 2005 Jyllands-Posten Muhammad cartoons controversy, which led to a media hype. Government officials and politicians attempted to dissuade Wilders from releasing the film. Following multiple delays, Fitna was released in March 2008. Although the Dutch government distanced itself from the film and it received international reactions, it offered little new, and the anticipated escalation did not materialize. Fitna later became part of a hate speech trial against Geert Wilders, in which he was ultimately acquitted.

==== 2010 Municipal elections ====
The PVV participated in the March 2010 municipal elections only in The Hague and Almere due to a shortage of suitable candidates. MPs Sietse Fritsma and Raymond de Roon headed the candidate lists. The PVV emerged as the largest party in Almere, winning 22% of the votes, and the second largest in The Hague with 17%. Wilders was lijstduwer in The Hague and was elected through preference votes, subsequently joining the council. However, negotiations to join the municipal executive failed in both cities, partly due to the PVV's demand to ban headscarves for civil servants.

=== Coalition government (2010–2012) ===
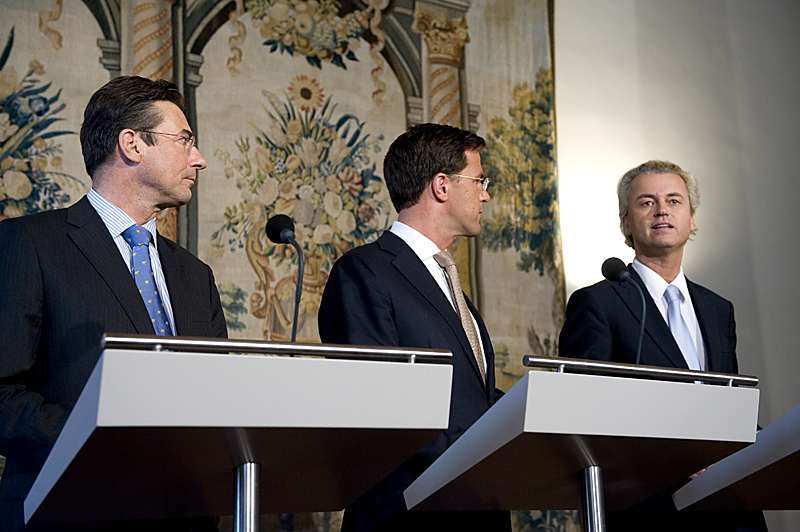
Maxime Verhagen (left) and Mark Rutte (center) presenting the coalition agreement with support of the PVV of Geert Wilders (right) in 2010

In the 9 June 2010 general election, the PVV went from nine to 24 seats. During the subsequent cabinet formation, the PVV agreed to provide confidence and supply to a right-wing minority coalition of People's Party for Freedom and Democracy (VVD) and Christian Democratic Appeal, despite opposition in the latter party. Providing only confidence and supply, it had no representation within the cabinet. The PVV did not have to support everything in the coalition agreement of CDA and VVD, but only which was agreed upon in a separate gedoogakkoord, which included immigration policy, security, healthcare and financial policy.

In 2012, the PVV party launched a website named Reporting Centre on Central and East Europeans to receive complaints about Central and East European immigrants in the Netherlands. 'Do you have problems with people from Central and Eastern Europe? Have you lost your job to a Pole, a Bulgarian, a Romanian or another East European? We want to know,' the website states. It displays newspaper headlines such as 'Wouldn't it be better if you went back home?' and 'East Europeans, increasingly criminal'. The European Commission has condemned the website, and EU Justice Commissioner Viviane Reding declared, "We call on all citizens of the Netherlands not to join in this intolerance. Citizens should instead clearly state on the PVV's website that Europe is a place of freedom." The website caused a lot of controversy within the European Union.

On 20 March 2012, Hero Brinkman quit the party, citing a lack of democratic structure within the PVV among other things; qualifying this with a statement of continued support for the minority Rutte cabinet. Two days later, three members of the States of North Holland representing the PVV followed him. In July 2012, Marcial Hernandez and Wim Kortenoeven quit the PVV, both citing what they considered to be Wilders' autocratic leadership of the party.

=== Opposition (2012–2023) ===
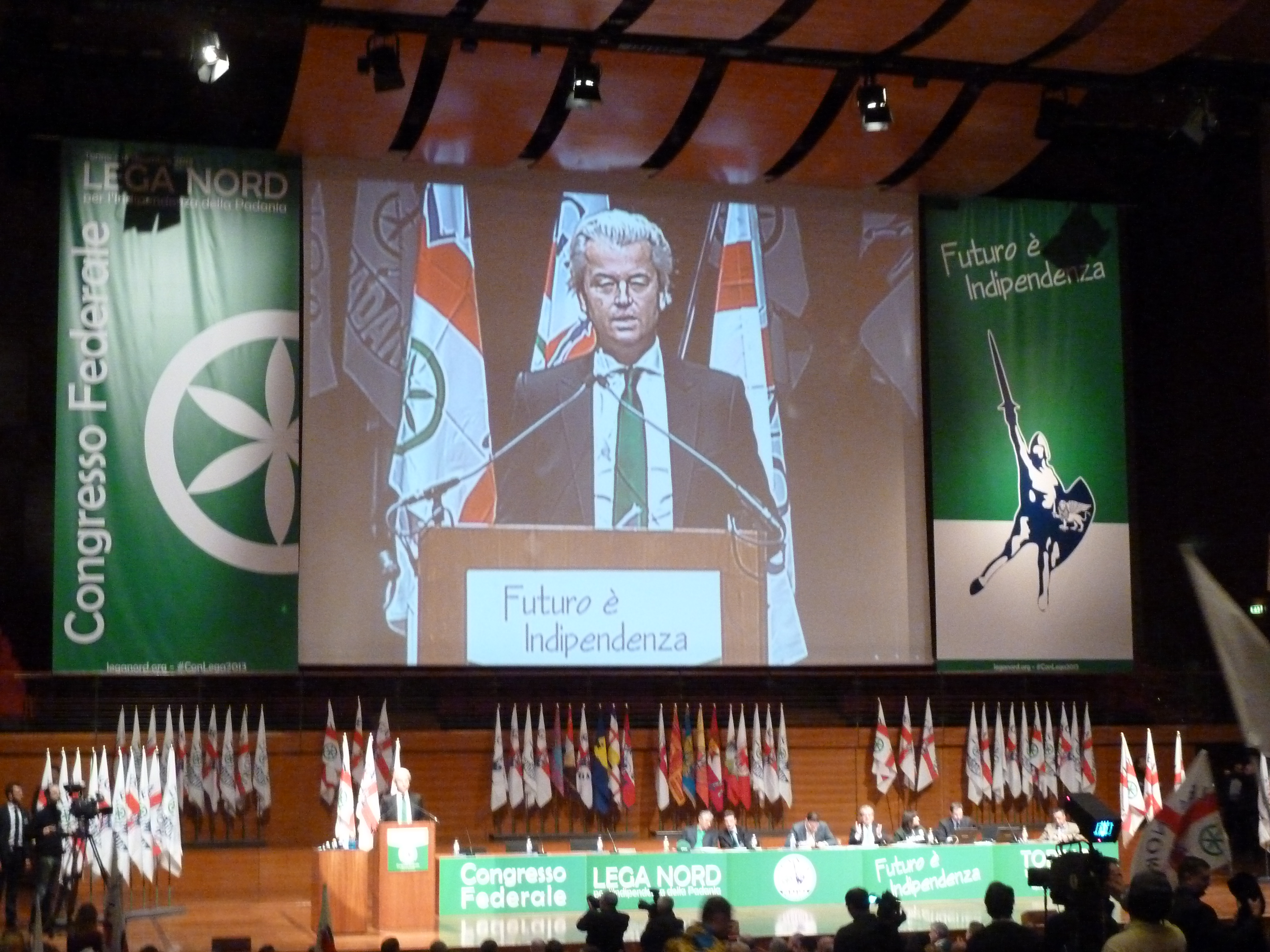
Geert Wilders speaking at a Lega Nord event in 2013

In the parliamentary elections of 12 September 2012, the PVV went from 24 to 15 seats (of 150), winning 10% of the vote. In October 2013, the party expelled Louis Bontes, but he kept his seat in parliament.

During election night of the 2014 municipal elections, Wilders asked a crowd of his followers whether they wanted more or less Moroccans, to which the crowd replied with "Less, less, less". This led to commotion, including within the party. Some municipal and provincial councilors left the party, as well as MPs Roland van Vliet and Joram van Klaveren. Wilders was later found guilty of group insult in a second trial against him, but received no sentence.

In the European Parliament election on 22 May 2014, the party kept its four seats in the European Parliament. On 16 June 2015, the Party for Freedom and other right-wing nationalist parties in the European Parliament formed the political group Europe of Nations and Freedom. Marcel de Graaff of the PVV and Marine Le Pen of the National Front became the first co-presidents of this group.

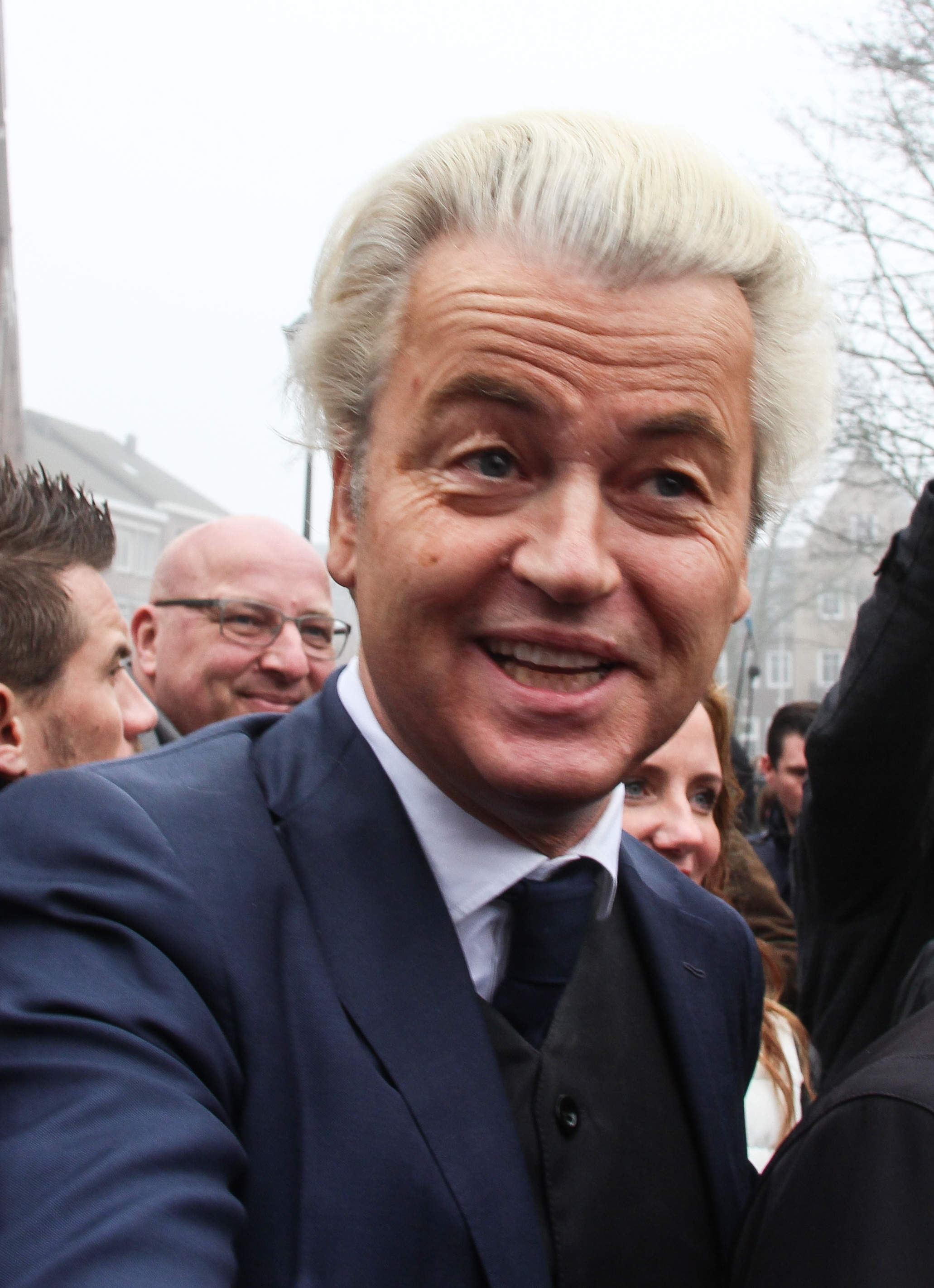
Geert Wilders during the campaign for the 2017 general election

The Party for Freedom rose in polls during the 2015 European migrant crisis, with the party topping polls from September 2015 through to late February 2017. However, in the relative absence of Geert Wilders during the campaign – notably refusing to participate in both RTL debates – support for the PVV collapsed, and the VVD secured a narrow lead in the final weeks before the election. The 2017 Dutch–Turkish diplomatic incident happened less than a week before the election; it was speculated that this benefited the Prime Minister's party (VVD), as Rutte's response to the incident was well received.

For the 2017 general election, the PVV had an election platform of a single page. The party won 20 seats, which was five seats more than the previous election. Despite ending second, the PVV played no role in the 2017 cabinet formation because all major parties said they would not form a government coalition with the PVV.

The party performed poorly in the 2019 provincial elections and reported issues attracting suitable candidates. The party lost 26 seats, with the Forum for Democracy (FvD) taking many of its voters. The party also saw a setback during the 2019 European Parliament election, winning zero seats, but being allocated one in post-Brexit appointments. This was taken by Marcel de Graaff until 2022, when he defected to FvD.

The party finished in third place during the 2021 general election, but played no role in the subsequent formation.

=== Largest party in parliament (2023–2025) ===
The fourth Rutte cabinet fell in July 2023, after the parties failed to agree on measures to restrict migration. The party saw a massive resurgence in support and its best result to date during the November 2023 general election in which it finished in first place. It was also noted Wilders had softened some of his statements and moderated some of the PVV's positions, and that immigration was one of the most important issues of the election which helped to boost his appeal. After the election, PVV parliamentarian Martin Bosma was elected Speaker of the House of Representatives making it the first time a member of the PVV has held the position.

In May 2024, after six months of negotiations, a coalition deal was struck between the PVV, NSC, BBB, and VVD. During the talks, all parties agreed that none of their leaders would serve as Prime Minister, opting instead for an independent politician. The PVV initially nominated Ronald Plasterk for the role, but his candidacy was withdrawn following accusations of fraud. The PVV then proposed Dick Schoof, a civil servant, as Prime Minister. The Schoof cabinet was sworn in on 2 July 2024, with PVV politician Fleur Agema appointed as Deputy Prime Minister. The PVV withdrew from the cabinet on 3 June 2025 after failing to come to an agreement with coalition partners over amending the Netherlands's asylum rules.

=== Return to opposition and split-off (2025–present) ===
In the 2025 Dutch general election, the PVV lost 11 seats and ended up second-place to D66 with 26 seats.

In January 2026, seven MPs left the parliamentary group out of discontent with Wilders's leadership. They started a new group led by Gidi Markuszower.

== Ideology ==
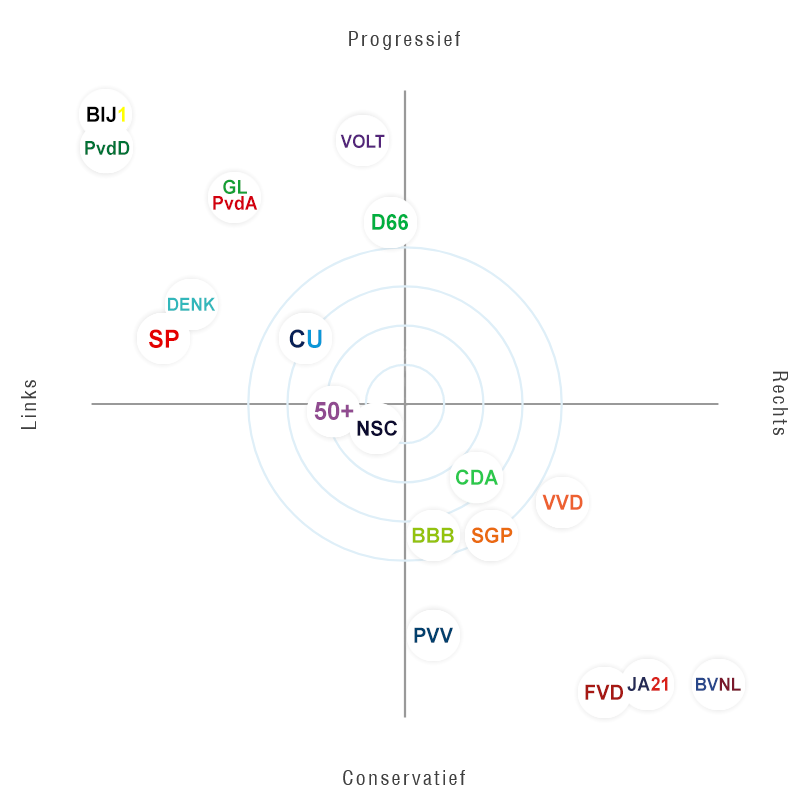
The Dutch political landscape in 2023, taken from Kieskompas

The PVV is generally considered far-right. More specifically, the party is considered radical right and right-wing populist. Dutch media and academics generally avoid the term "extreme right" (Dutch: extreemrechts), in particular because the party does not want to abolish democracy and does not advocate violence.

The PVV combines its right-wing politics with some left-leaning social positions, which makes it harder to position the party on the left-right scale. On certain themes such as healthcare, social services, LGBT rights and elderly care the PVV can be seen as left-leaning and social democratic, albeit selectively.

Observers have also noted that Wilders avoids positioning the party within the traditional political spectrum, but have variously described the PVV's ideology as encompassing elements of liberalism, national liberalism, conservative liberalism, Dutch nationalism and national populism. Wilders has identified himself as a right-wing liberal and was initially reluctant to collaborate with far-right parties in Europe. Others have claimed that the PVV overlaps in some areas with the former Pim Fortuyn List party which combined nationalism and liberal principles.

Political historian Koen Vossen identified four pillars of the PVV's ideology: anti-Islam, populism, nationalism and law and order.

=== Social issues ===
==== Islam ====
The party campaigns on a strong counter-jihad agenda. The PVV's view of Islam is amongst others inspired by Oriana Fallaci's The Force of Reason, Bat Ye'or's Eurabia and the works of Hans Jansen. Specific proposals the PVV have made regarding Islam include banning the Quran, closing Islamic schools, shutting down all mosques in the Netherlands, banning migration from Islamic countries, stopping subsidies for Islamic media and organisations, banning headscarves in public buildings, banning Quran lessons in school and introducing a head rag tax.

==== Dual citizenship ====
The PVV seeks to exclude Dutch citizens with dual citizenship from voting, serving in the military, and holding political office. The PVV argues that dual citizens may have conflicting loyalties. While in opposition, the party filed motions of no confidence against cabinet members with dual citizenship, such as Ahmed Aboutaleb and Nebahat Albayrak (both in 2007). However, while in coalition, the party refrained from filing such motions, as seen with Marlies Veldhuijzen van Zanten in 2010.

==== Abortion and LGBTQ rights ====
The party utilizes its liberal stances on issues such as abortion and gay rights to present itself as a "a defender of women and gay people in the face of the advance of an 'intolerant and backward Islam'". The PVV has generally taken a more moderate and socially liberal attitude on LGBTQ rights and same-sex marriage in contrast to other European populist parties.

The party is critical of parts of LGBTQ education in schools, specifically lessons regarding gender identity and gender expression (which it refers to as 'gender propaganda' and 'sexual indoctrination'). In 2023, the PVV refused to sign the Rainbow accord (Regenboogakkoord in Dutch), which made parties pledge and agree to take action against discrimination based on sexual orientation, gender and skin colour by handing out harsher sentences for violent crimes, more detectives to research discrimination and providing safer refuge for LGBT refugees. The accord also called for schools to pay more attention to LGBTQ education in school and an end to identity declarations where parents or students would show to which world view they subscribe and take distance from homosexuality.

=== Foreign policy ===
The PVV's foreign policy is based on its skepticism towards Islam and opposition to European integration. The party was supportive of the war on terror in the beginning, but changed its position around 2016 to non-interventionism, arguing the Netherlands is not responsible for the "rubble of the Islamic world". According to the PVV, the Netherlands Armed Forces should be focused on safety within the border. The PVV opposes foreign development aid, arguing that is not effective.

==== European Union ====
It has generally taken a position of Hard Euroscepticism and argued for Dutch withdrawal from the European Union (Nexit). The party states that the EU does not financially benefit the Dutch tax payer, has eroded too much domestic decision making and democracy of its member states and leaves the Netherlands unable to control its borders. The party has also advocated for withdrawal from the eurozone and the reintroduction of the Dutch guilder and has also proposed an alternative currency it calls the neuro which would be created as a parallel trading currency with Northern European states. The PVV also wants a similar opt-out agreement from the EU common asylum policy as Denmark.

Following the 2024 European Parliament election, the PVV said it would pause its support for Nexit and made this decision to accommodate its negotiation partners during the ongoing 2023-2024 cabinet formation. Wilders instead stated he would use his position in government to focus on eroding the EU's power from within.

==== Russia ====
A research paper by the European Center for Populism Studies described the PVV's prior attitude towards Putin and Russia as mixed and more complex compared to other national-populist movements, with Wilders making somewhat supportive statements of Putin in the context of portraying him as an ally against Islamic terrorism and immigration, the PVV advocating a neutral policy on the ongoing Russo-Ukrainian War in 2014 and opposing Ukrainian membership of the EU.

However, the paper notes Wilders and the PVV hardened their attitude towards Russia after the shooting down of Malaysia Airlines flight MH17 with the PVV manifesto calling for the perpetrators to be brought to justice. Following the Russian invasion of Ukraine in 2022, the PVV voted in parliament to condemn the invasion and called for an end to Russian aggression. Despite its otherwise strict stance on immigration, the PVV said the Netherlands should temporarily accommodate Ukrainian refugees whom the party regards as legitimate refugees fleeing war. The party has since expressed some criticism of the extent of Dutch military support for Ukraine and has advocated for a diplomatic solution to the conflict.

==== Israeli-Palestinian conflict ====
The PVV supports the one-state solution and considers Jordan to be "the only Palestinian state that will ever exist". In 2010, Wilders voiced his support for Yisrael Beiteinu and held talks with its leader Avigdor Lieberman. Wilders is a frequent visitor to Israel and spent six months on a moshav in the West Bank at the age of 17. The party supports recognising Jerusalem as the capital of Israel and proposed moving the Dutch embassy there. Following the Gaza war, Wilders drew condemnation from Arab states for advocating for the relocation of Palestinians to Jordan.

=== Legal policy ===
The PVV advocates harsher criminal justice policies. Amongst others, the PVV calls for more police and a zero tolerance policy. The PVV calls for higher sentences, including a three-strikes law, and more sober detention. Despite drawing inspiration from American law and order politicians such as Rudy Giuliani and Joe Arpaio, the PVV opposes capital punishment and the right to keep and bear arms.

Like many other populist parties, the PVV is critical of the judiciary, which they see as limiting popular sovereignty. To limit their power, the PVV advocates for mandatory sentencing and election of judges. The party opposes what it sees as juridification of politics, and has instead opted for a strategy of politisation of the judiciary. The party calls into question the neutrality and political impartiality of the judiciary, often calling judges elitist and left-wing. To strengthen national sovereignty, the PVV also opposes treaties, in particular if they introduce international courts. This includes the European Court of Human Rights, Court of Justice of the European Union and arbitration introduced in the Comprehensive Economic and Trade Agreement.

== Organisation ==
=== Name and symbols ===
The name 'Party for Freedom' (Dutch: Partij voor de Vrijheid) is a reference to the Freedom Party (Dutch: Partij van de Vrijheid), a Dutch political party founded in 1946, shortly after World War II. In 1948, the Freedom Party went on as the People's Party for Freedom and Democracy (Dutch: Volkspartij voor Vrijheid en Democratie), which is the party Wilders split from.

The party logo consists of the party name and a gull in red, white, and blue, which are the colors of the Dutch flag. The gull symbolises freedom or liberty. The gull had also been used as a symbol by the National Socialist Movement in the Netherlands on propaganda posters and for their youth wing, but Wilders claimed it was not inspired by Nazi usage.

=== Structure ===
In order to register for elections in the Netherlands, a political party needs to be an association, which can be founded by two or more members. The Association Group Wilders (Dutch: De Vereniging Groep Wilders) was founded in 2005 by Geert Wilders and the Foundation Group Wilders (Dutch: Stichting Groep Wilders), later renamed Foundation Friends of the PVV, of which Wilders is the only board member. The association was later renamed to Partij voor de Vrijheid (Party for Freedom). After the creation of the association, Wilders disabled new member registration, resulting in him remaining the sole member of the party. The party is considered unique in Dutch politics in that it does not organise public party conferences and does not have local departments, a youth wing, or a research institute.

The most important reason for refusing members was to prevent a repeat of the right-wing populist Pim Fortuyn List (LPF), which succumbed to factional infighting after the murder of its founder. The LPF also attracted troublemakers as well as people from the extreme right. Another reason was that Wilders' strict protection made it hard to organise membership meetings. Later, Wilders and Bosma would introduce more principled reasons, arguing that membership parties were old-fashioned and had lost their contact with society. Politicians within the party have advocated for democratisation of the party, most notably Hero Brinkman, but they received little support and their efforts failed.

Commentators have also cited Wilders as one of the first party leaders to use web and social media messages to reach voters instead of traditional public campaigning such as public rallies or meet and greets.

=== Support ===
Due to the PVV's structure, foreign political journalists have noted that members of the public do not often out themselves as PVV supporters and that it is sometimes difficult to determine who votes for the party despite its generally substantial results in elections. Some media outlets have noted that in line with other European populist parties, its voters tend to either be on the lower end of the socio-economic spectrum or those concerned about immigration and crime. A 2017 study by Dutch polling company Etnobarometer found that the PVV also receives support from some ethnic minority communities and that it was the second most voted for party among Surinamese-Dutch voters after the Labour Party, with the PVV doing particularly well among voters of Indo-Surinamese and Indian heritage.

=== Financing ===
In the Netherlands, a political party needs to have at least 1,000 members to be eligible for government funding, a requirement which the PVV does not meet with Wilders being the only member. The party thus relies on donations, which are received by the Stichting Vrienden van de PVV.

The party has not disclosed any of its finances until 2013, so little is known for certain. There are rumours that money was donated from the United States and Israel. For example, Hero Brinkman claimed in 2012 after he had left the party that the PVV received most of its finances from foreign (American) lobby groups. According to Reuters, Daniel Pipes' Middle East Forum paid for the trials and security of Geert Wilders and David Horowitz paid Wilders "a good fee" for two speeches given in the US.

Since 2013, Dutch political parties are required by law to disclose all donations of €4,500 or more. The PVV reported no donations for 2013. Between 2014 and 2017, the party disclosed more than €130,000 in donations from the California-based David Horowitz Freedom Center, more than €18,000 from a private donor in the Netherlands who according to the Anti-fascist research group Kafka donated to the Centre Democrats in the past, and a donation of €6,853 from the New York-based company FOL Inc.

== Election results ==
=== House of Representatives ===
Election	Lead candidate	List	Votes	%	Seats	+/–	Government
2006	Geert Wilders	List	579,490	5.89	9 / 150	New	Opposition
2010	Geert Wilders	List	1,454,493	15.45	24 / 150	▲15	Confidence and supply First Rutte cabinet
2012	Geert Wilders	List	950,263	10.08	15 / 150	▼9	Opposition
2017	Geert Wilders	List	1,372,941	13.06	20 / 150	▲5	Opposition
2021	Geert Wilders	List	1,125,022	10.81	17 / 150	▼3	Opposition
2023	Geert Wilders	List	2,450,878	23.49	37 / 150	▲20	Coalition (2024–2025); Schoof cabinet
2025	Geert Wilders	List	1,760,966	16.66	26 / 150	▼11	Opposition

=== Senate ===
Election results for the Senate
Election	Lead candidate	List	Votes	%	Seats	+/–
2011	Machiel de Graaf	List	72	12.74	10 / 75	New
2015	Marjolein Faber	List	66	11.58	9 / 75	▼1
2019	Marjolein Faber	List	38	6.46	5 / 75	▼4
2023	Marjolein Faber	List	34	5.52	4 / 75	▼1

=== European Parliament ===
Election		List	Votes	%	Seats	+/–	EP Group
2009	Pre-Lisbon Treaty	List	772,746	16.97	4 / 25	New	NI
2009	Post-Lisbon Treaty	List	772,746	16.97	5 / 26	▲1	NI
2014		List	633,114	13.32	4 / 26	▼1	ENF
2019	Pre-Brexit	List	194,178	3.53	0 / 26	▼4	ID
2019	Post-Brexit	List	194,178	3.53	1 / 29	▲1	ID
2024		List	1,057,662	16.97	6 / 31	▲5	PfE

== See also ==
- Centre Democrats (1984–2002)
- Cultural conservatism
- Criticism of Islamism
- Criticism of multiculturalism
- Pim Fortuyn List (2002–2008)
