= List of members of the Senate of the Netherlands for Forum for Democracy =

This is a list of all members of the Senate of the Netherlands for Forum for Democracy (FvD).

== List ==
Member	Term start	Term end	Ref.
Hugo Berkhout	26 October 2020	28 November 2020 (Note: Left the parliamentary group to form the Van Pareren Group)	
Toine Beukering	11 June 2019	28 November 2020	
Paul Cliteur	11 June 2019	25 November 2020	
Johan Dessing	11 June 2019		
Paul Frentrop	11 June 2019	30 March 2022 (Note: Left the parliamentary group to form the Group Frentrop)	
Otto Hermans	10 September 2019	11 November 2019	
Otto Hermans	18 February 2020	28 November 2020	
Theo Hiddema	13 April 2021	30 March 2022	
Eric Kemperman	9 September 2025 (Note: Was previously member of the Senate for the Farmer–Citizen Movement (BBB))		
Lennart van der Linden	11 June 2019	14 December 2020	
Annabel Nanninga	11 June 2019	25 October 2020	
Joris van den Oetelaar	13 June 2023		
Henk Otten	11 June 2019	24 July 2019 (Note: Left the parliamentary group to form the Group Otten)	
Bob van Pareren	11 June 2019	28 November 2020	
Nicki Pouw-Verweij	11 June 2019	28 November 2020	
Dorien Rookmaker	11 June 2019	19 August 2019 (Note: Left the parliamentary group to join the Group Otten)	
Jeroen de Vries	11 June 2019	19 August 2019	
Loek van Wely	11 June 2019	8 December 2020	
