= Annabel Nanninga =

Dutch politician (born 1977)

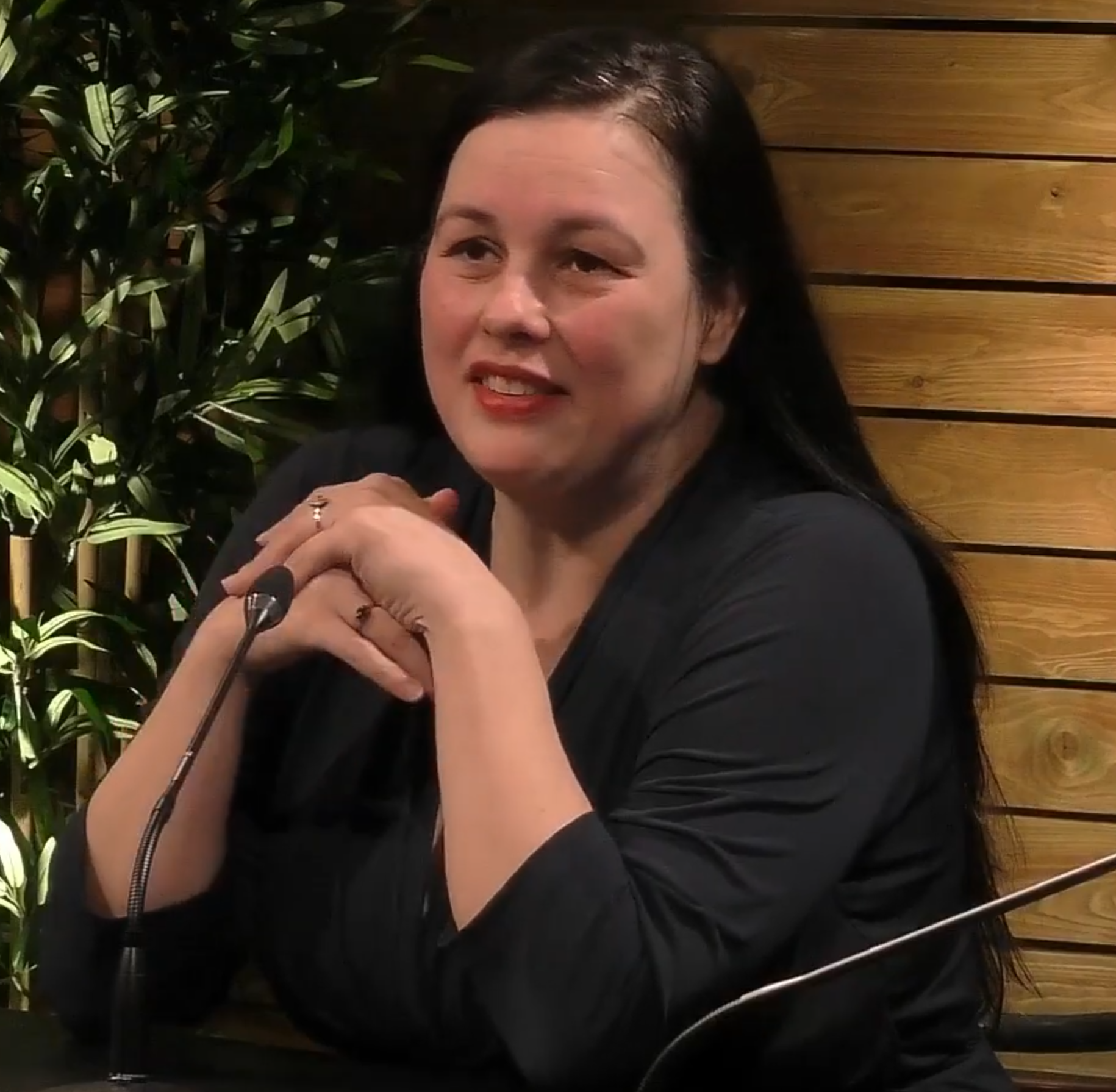
- Nanninga in 2021

Member of the House of Representatives
- Incumbent
- Assumed office 12 November 2025

Leader of JA21 in the Senate
- In office 18 December 2020 – 6 November 2025
- Preceded by: Position established
- Succeeded by: Karin van Bijsterveld

Member of the Senate
- In office 15 February 2021 – 6 November 2025
- Succeeded by: Toine Beukering
- In office 11 June 2019 – 25 October 2020

Member of the States of North Holland
- In office 28 March 2019 – 28 March 2023

Member of the Amsterdam Municipal Council
- In office 29 March 2018 – 7 November 2023

Personal details
- Born: Annabella Nanninga; 6 November 1977 (age 48) Amsterdam, Netherlands
- Party: JA21 (since 2020)
- Other political affiliations: FvD (2017–2020)
- Children: 3
- Occupation: Journalist • Politician

Annabella "Annabel" Nanninga (born 6 November 1977) is a Dutch politician and former journalist who co-founded the JA21 party alongside Joost Eerdmans in 2020. She has been a member of the House of Representatives since 2025. Nanninga previously led the party in the Senate (2020–2025) and was a representative in the States of North Holland (2019–2023). She was first a member of the Amsterdam Municipal Council from 2018 to 2023, first elected for Forum for Democracy (FvD).

== Early life ==
Nanninga was born in the Amsterdam neighbourhood Dapperbuurt. Also in Amsterdam, she attended the prestigious Barlaeus Gymnasium (high school). In an interview with RTL Nederland, she stated that she sometimes skipped classes to self-educate in the public library at the Prinsengracht. Nanninga subsequently dropped out of school as a teenager and held various jobs including in an ice cream parlor, as a caterer and in a fashion store.

== Career ==
In 2012, she took an interest in blogging and journalism and began submitting op-eds to GeenStijl, PowNed, and Veronica Magazine among others. In 2014, she co-founded the Dutch online news platform Jalta.nl with Joshua Livestro and was the site's managing editor until 2015. The website hired notable figures such as Frits Bolkestein, Thierry Baudet and Hafid Bouazza to write columns. She was also a columnist for DeJaap magazine.

== Political career ==
In the 2018 Dutch municipal elections, she was the party leader for Forum for Democracy (FvD) in Amsterdam. FvD received three seats in the municipal council. Nanninga was sworn in as a councilor on 29 March 2018. In March 2019 she also became a member of the Provincial Council of North Holland. In the same elections, she was elected in the Provincial Council of Utrecht with preferential votes. In October 2020 Nanninga went on maternity leave and was temporarily replaced by Hugo Berkhout and later by Robert Baljeu in the Senate.

In November 2020, she left the FvD, when this party, in her opinion, did not distance itself fiercely enough from antisemitic apps written by members of its youth division. Together with former FvD candidate Joost Eerdmans she founded the party JA21. On 15 February 2021, she returned to the Senate from her leave and joined the Van Pareren faction, which was renamed the Nanninga faction and has 7 seats. The faction subsequently became part of JA21.

== Controversies ==
Nanninga posted a series of tweets on her Twitter page in 2006, which some people deemed antisemitic. According to others, her tweets were shown out of context and twisted in order to discredit her. These tweets were retroactively deleted in 2020–2021, however multiple internet archives contain screenshots of the tweets. In subsequent interviews, Nanninga stated that the tweets were intended to be satirical and had to be considered in their specific context, on which she extensively elaborated in Nieuw Israëlietisch Weekblad.

Nanninga wrote columns criticizing the influx of migrants during the European refugee crisis and made satirical remarks regarding migrants from Africa trying to cross the Mediterranean Sea. Nanninga stated she used the ironic writing style of Gerard Reve.

== Personal life ==
Nanninga has three children: her first daughter was born when she was 19 years old; her second daughter followed three years later. In 2020 she had a son. In 2015, at the height of the refugee crisis, she sheltered a homosexual asylumseeker in her house for six months, because he was harassed at the asylum centre.

== Electoral history ==
Electoral history of Annabel Nanninga
| Year | Body | Party | Pos. | Votes | Result | | Ref. |
| Year | Body | Party | Pos. | Votes | Party seats | Individual | Ref. |
|---|---|---|---|---|---|---|---|
| 2018 | Amsterdam Municipal Council | Forum for Democracy | 1 | 14,753 | 3 | Won | |
| 2019 | Provincial Council of North Holland | Forum for Democracy | 15 | 7,509 | 9 | Lost | |
| 2019 | Provincial Council of Utrecht | Forum for Democracy | 14 | | 6 | Lost | |
| 2019 | Senate | Forum for Democracy | 3 | | 12 | Won | |
| 2021 | House of Representatives | JA21 | 30 (Note: Nanninga participated as a lijstduwer.) | 11,396 | 3 | Lost | |
| 2022 | Amsterdam Municipal Council | JA21 | 1 | 11,821 | 2 | Won | |
| 2023 | Senate | JA21 | 1 | | 3 | Won | |
| 2023 | House of Representatives | JA21 | 2 | 10,132 | 1 | Lost | |
| 2024 | European Parliament | JA21 | 14 | 2,161 | 0 | Lost | |
| 2025 | House of Representatives | JA21 | 2 | 66,552 | 9 | Won | |
| 2026 | Amsterdam Municipal Council | JA21 | 21 | 1,513 | 2 | Lost | |
