= Simone Kennedy (politician) =

Dutch Christian Union politician

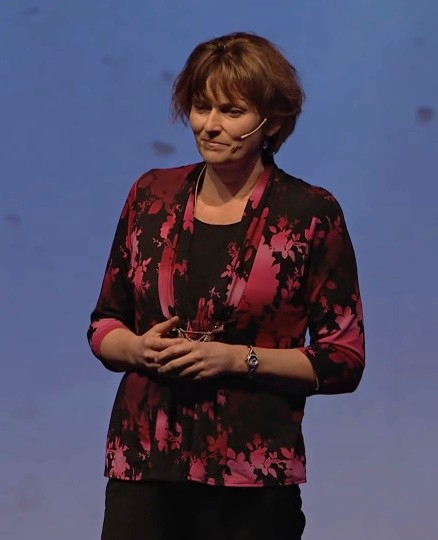
- Kennedy at a 2016 conference

Senator
- In office 17 January 2023 – 12 June 2023
- Preceded by: Peter Ester

Member of the Provincial Council of Utrecht
- Incumbent
- Assumed office 29 March 2023

Member of the Amersfoort Municipal Council
- In office 18 April 2006 – 29 March 2022
- Preceded by: Hans van Daalen

Personal details
- Born: Simone Jeanet Doornbos; 19 December 1970 (age 55) Kampen, Netherlands
- Party: Christian Union
- Other political affiliations: Reformed Political League (before 2003)
- Spouse: James Kennedy (m. 1994)
- Children: 3
- Education: University of Amsterdam (MSc)
- Occupation: Politician; translator; tour operator

Simone Jeanet Kennedy-Doornbos (Dutch pronunciation: [siˈmoːnə ˈkɛnədi]; née Doornbos; born 19 December 1970) is a Dutch politician of the Christian Union. Raised in a Reformed family in 't Harde, Kennedy studied medical biology at the University of Amsterdam. As a student, she ran for the municipal council of Amsterdam in 1991 as the lead candidate of the Reformed Political League (GPV) – a precursor of the Christian Union. She married historian James Kennedy in 1994, and the couple moved to Iowa that same year.

Nine years later, when Kennedy went back to the Netherlands and settled in Amersfoort, she became active in both local and national politics. She joined the Christian Union's permanent campaign as well as several committees and its think tank before being elected to the Dutch municipal council in 2006. She served four terms as a councilor, filling the positions of leader of the Christian Union's parliamentary group and vice chairman of the council. During the 2015 European migrant crisis, Kennedy spoke out against the living conditions of refugees in the Netherlands, and she played a central role in local volunteering for asylum seekers.

Kennedy also participated in several national elections between 2006 and 2019 but was never elected. She was appointed to the Senate for five months in January 2023 after the death of Peter Ester and to the Provincial Council of Utrecht two months later.

== Early life ==
Kennedy was born in 1970 as Simone Doornbos in the Overijssel city of Kampen as the oldest of five children. Her parents were Frisians, and her father worked as an engineer. At two years old, she moved to the village of 't Harde, located across the border in Gelderland. Her family belonged to the Reformed Church, and Kennedy attended an elementary school of that denomination in Dronten. As a child, she did gymnastics, played volleyball, and she learned to play the piano. She went to the Greijdanus Secondary School in Zwolle, receiving her VWO diploma in 1989.

Kennedy subsequently studied medical biology at the University of Amsterdam until her graduation in 1994. While a student, she became politically active as a member of the Reformed Political League (GPV) – a precursor of the Christian Union. According to Kennedy, her interest in politics was minimal, but she joined the party in order to participate in a 1990 trip to the Soviet Union organized by the GPV's youth organization called the GPJC. She later became chair of GPJC Amsterdam, and she presented the GPV's national campaign for the May 1994 general election. Kennedy ran for the Amsterdam Municipal Council in the March 1994 local elections as the GPV's lead candidate. Prior to this moment, the conservative party had never managed to win a council seat in Amsterdam. Kennedy conceded that she did not expect to be elected, but explained that the campaign allowed the party to be recognized. The GPV received 0.6% of the vote – not enough to claim a seat.

== Personal life ==
In 1991, she met her husband, James Carleton Kennedy, as they were both attending the Tituskapel in Amsterdam. James had been born in 1963 in Orange City, Iowa, to an American father and a mother from Rotterdam. He was visiting the Netherlands on a Fulbright scholarship to write his dissertation about Dutch history. The couple married on 9 August 1994 in the English Reformed Church, part of the Amsterdam Begijnhof. They spent four months in the Christian living community L'Abri in Eck en Wiel before moving to the United States in December. They initially lived in Iowa City where James was completing his dissertation titled Building New Babylon: Cultural Change in the Netherlands During the 1960s at the University of Iowa. A translated version by Kennedy was published in 1995. Unable to find a job in her field of study, Kennedy was employed by a women's shelter and did some secretarial work before setting up a travel agency called Eurotrail, organizing cycling trips in the Netherlands. Kennedy moved to Holland, Michigan, – a city with a significant Dutch-American community – in 1997. She was also active as a translator for Hope College's A. C. Van Raalte Institute. Kennedy's daughter was born in 1996, and two sons were born in 1998 and 2000.

When James became a history professor at the Vrije Universiteit Amsterdam in 2003, the family returned to the Netherlands after spending nine years in the United States, settling in Amersfoort. Throughout her political career, Kennedy kept organizing cycling trips for American tourists, operating under the name Hollandtrail. She translated her husband's book called A Concise History of the Netherlands (2017). Kennedy has remained a member of the Reformed Church, and her family has taken care of foster children.

== Amersfoort politics ==
=== Early career ===
Along with her religious life, Kennedy became active for the party in her new hometown of Amersfoort. She initially assisted its parliamentary group in the municipal council, and she participated in the March 2006 municipal elections in which the Christian Union won three seats. Kennedy was not elected, but entered in the council on 18 April 2006, when Hans van Daalen vacated his seat to become an alderman in the new municipal executive. Kennedy became her party's spokesperson for urban management, education, housing, economy, culture, tourism, recreation, and sports.

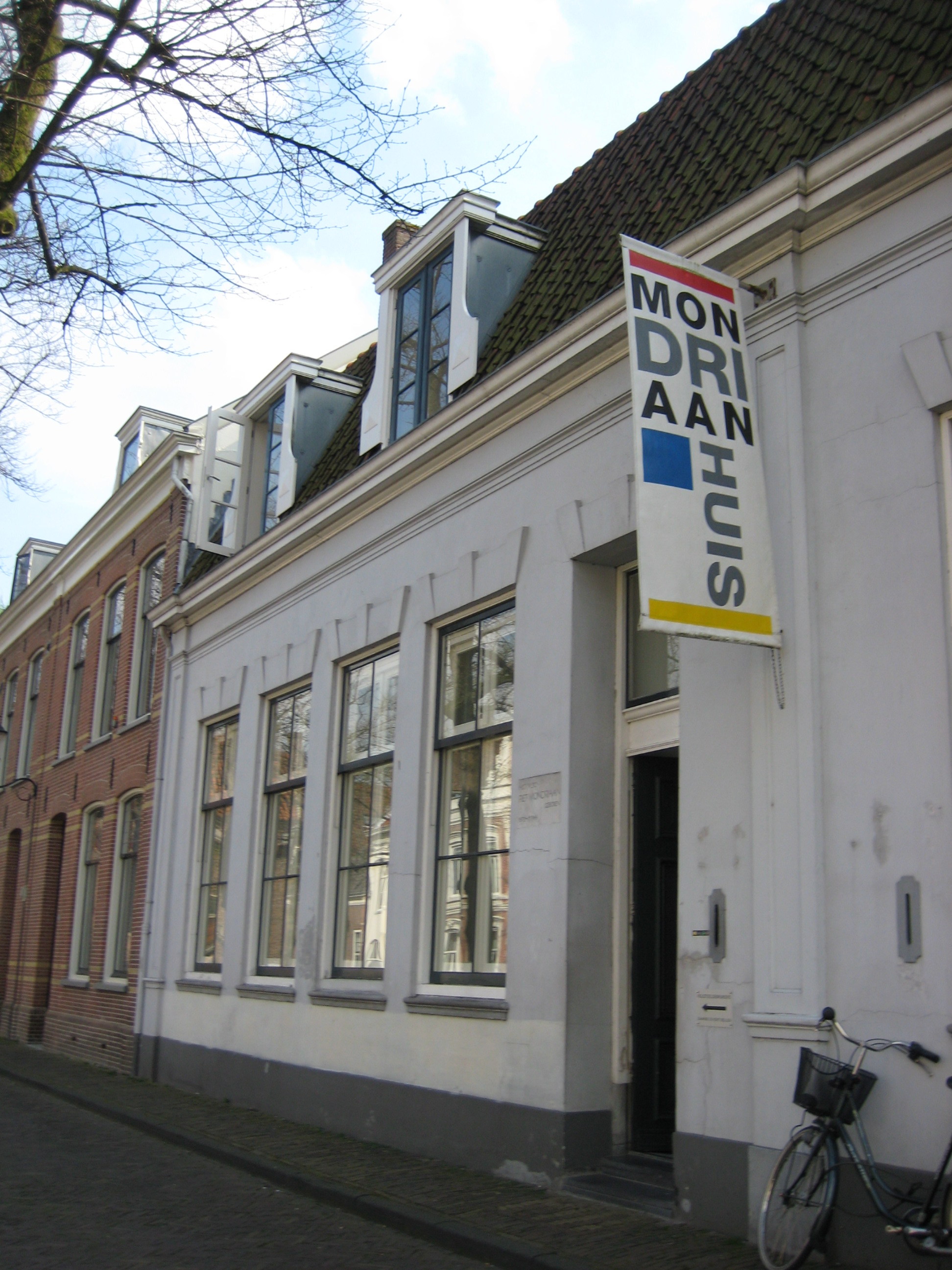
The Mondriaan House in 2008

As a councilor, she opposed an artistic porn festival that was planned to be organized in the city in the spring of 2007. She argued that it should not be held in a public space such that people would not be unintentionally confronted with sexually explicit content. She co-filed a motion to not designate the event as "cultural" in order to withhold subsidies. It did not receive support from a council majority, but the subsidies were not granted in the end for a late application. During her term, Kennedy also drew media attention for her knitting during council meetings. She told media outlets that she had transitioned from knitting below her desk to above it, responding to the positivity posed by the audience. However, Kennedy announced in March 2007 that she would stop the practice to prevent leaving a disinterested impression. In 2008, the Mondriaan House and the cultural foundation Amersfoort in C planned a merger for financial troubles from the Mondriaan House. Kennedy was critical of the foundation's plans to replace the collection of abstract constructivist and concrete art by works of local young artists. She argued in the council that the Mondriaan House should spend €160,000 ($240,000 USD) in subsidies on the acquisition of a climate system such that it could exhibit abstract works of art on loan. After a private party offered money, a compromise was reached between Amersfoort in C and the Mondriaan House under which the abstract art would remain and the climate system would be purchased. Kennedy co-sponsored a motion to provide the municipal funding required to execute the plan.

Kennedy was re-elected in March 2010 as the Christian Union's second candidate behind Van Daalen while the party retained its three seats. Kennedy was chosen as the council's vice chairman, allowing her to preside over meetings in the absence of the mayor. The new governing coalition consisted of the VVD, GroenLinks, D66, the CDA, and the local BPA party that stepped out in December. The Christian Union joined the remaining coalition parties seven weeks later after Kennedy had represented her party during the negotiations. She simultaneously succeeded Menno Tigelaar as the leader of the parliamentary group in the council, since Tigelaar joined the municipal executive. As a coalition party, the Christian Union voted in favor of a round of spending cuts totaling €20 million ($30,000,000 USD). However, during the preceding budget talks, Kennedy complained about savings on basic services. Specifically, she highlighted the removal of swimming lessons from the primary school curriculum, the closings of several library locations and neighborhood centers, and the removal of transportation for disabled students 7 km (4 mi) from a school as painful. The coalition fell again in December 2012 due to a conflict between the VVD and GroenLinks, and a new one was formed that excluded the Christian Union.

Kennedy was the party's lead candidate in the March 2014 municipal elections in which the Christian Union increased its seat count from three to five. The party entered into a new governing coalition with the VVD, D66, and the Labour Party. Kennedy proposed to subsidize couples therapy for disadvantaged people, arguing that poverty and hardship resulting from divorces are costly to society. The Christian Union also cooperated with three homeless shelters to connect homeless youth with families willing to take them into their home. In 2017, a majority of the council voted in favor of a joint proposal by the party and the CDA to make it possible for troublemakers to be placed in a temporary house. However, some questions about its legality were later raised, as the measure would not be imposed by a judge.

=== Refugee crisis ===
In 2015, Europe experienced an increased number of migrants entering the continent – partly as a result of the Syrian civil war. In an opinion article, Kennedy proposed to convert empty office buildings, schools, and healthcare facilities into cohousing units for refugees to divert demand away from the real estate market. She suggested that they could also temporarily house students, divorced parents, and people early in their career. Some councilors criticized the plan, saying it would lead to clashes between different groups and ghettos in the city. The idea was later brought into practice at several locations. Kennedy herself had taken in a Syrian lesbian professor before the influx of refugees had started as suggested by her husband. She created a Facebook group called Gastgezin Amersfoort (Host family Amersfoort) in September 2015 for people interested in volunteering for or housing refugees. It grew to 800 members and became the center of coordinating volunteer work to aid refugees in the city. On 30 September, a group of refugees stayed a week in an Amersfoort sports hall. They moved to an empty school building before being relocated on 11 November to an emergency shelter in Soesterberg. She criticized the Central Agency for the Reception of Asylum Seekers (COA), saying that refugees were only given basic necessities. According to Kennedy, not providing refugees with language courses, activities, or a purpose destroyed them mentally. Furthermore, she told that the move to Soesterberg challenged volunteers to enter in.

Kennedy announced in May 2016 that she would cease volunteering for refugees, as she could no longer handle it. She believed that all asylum seekers in Soesterberg were depressed, and she encouraged others to take on the work. Kennedy did continue some activities, connecting refugees with people willing to have them stay in their empty home during the summer holiday. Kennedy received significant media attention for her refugee work, including from national publications.

=== Final term ===
Kennedy sought a fourth term in the council of the March 2018 municipal elections as the Christian Union's lead candidate. The party lost one of its five seats, while it had – in contrast to previous election cycles – competition from the Reformed Political Party (SGP). Kennedy did not renominate herself as the council's vice chair after this election. In May 2019, she announced that she would not run for re-election, citing term limits imposed by the party. She already stepped down as parliamentary leader as of the start of the following year in order to focus on her career and on the national election campaign, being succeeded by Hans Bol. Her final term ended on 29 March 2022 following municipal elections earlier that month. On her last day in the council, the municipality awarded Kennedy the Sint-Jorispenning – a medal given to people who have significantly contributed to the city. She had earlier become a member of the Order of Orange-Nassau in April 2017. She received those honors for her career in local politics as well as for her volunteering and refugee work. Kennedy volunteered at De Kandelaar, a Reformed church; at the Amersfoort food bank; at Stadsring 51, a local credit counseling foundation; and at CJVV, a local football club. She also co-founded the Amersfoort diaconal charity fund in 2013.

After her exit form local politics, Kennedy became a youth care worker for The Salvation Army, and she coordinated the sheltering of Ukrainian refugees following the Russian invasion of Ukraine as a location manager for the municipality. She fulfilled the latter role until November 2022.

== National and provincial politics ==
=== Permanent campaign and think tank ===
Upon her return to the Netherlands in 2003, Kennedy joined the Christian Union's permanent campaign and the party's women's working group called Inclusief as well as the board of trustees of its think tank. She chaired a Christian Union working group on public art. Together with Arie Slob – a former House member – Kennedy argued that public spaces should not be used to showcase innovative and experimental art, calling such works incomprehensible to the general population. She then proposed to have more public art that reflects the ideology and history of the city itself. For her hometown of Amersfoort, she suggested erecting statues of statesman Johan van Oldenbarnevelt (1547–1619) and painter Piet Mondrian (1872–1944), both born in the city. Kennedy also wrote an opinion piece for de Volkskrant in that period, in which she criticized childcare benefits introduced by the 2004 Childcare Act. According to Kennedy, the government was financially punishing stay-at-home parents and subsidizing double-income families. She recommended a four-year benefit to be received by all parents to maximize freedom of choice.

As part of the permanent campaign, Kennedy helped write the Christian Union's election program for general elections in 2006, 2010, and 2012. During those elections, she also occupied places 12, 13, and 39 on the party list, respectively. She ran for the Senate in May 2011 as the party's third candidate whilst mentioning the importance of personal responsibility. Kennedy was not elected due to the Christian Union losing two of its four Senate seats. Kennedy co-authored a 2009 publication by Christian Union's think tank that called for a raise of the retirement age – contrary to the party's official position – to relieve younger families. The measure would generate additional tax income to prepare for upcoming costs. Kennedy stated that parents would not have to be pushed to work more and would therefore have enough time to spend with their families as well as participating in volunteering. In 2012, during the European debt crisis, the Christian Union joined the VVD, the CDA, GroenLinks, and D66 in support of a budget that raised the retirement age from 65 to 67 years after the first Rutte cabinet had fallen.

Kennedy never ran for a Senate seat in the 2015 election, saying she wanted to remain a councilor in Amersfoort in order to deal with new responsibilities that were given to municipalities as part of a decentralization effort. She considered herself to be too much like an activist, and announced her candidacy for the 2017 general election as her children had become more independent. However, she was disappointed with her 22nd spot on the Christian Union's party list. After the Christian Union joined the new governing coalition, Kennedy found the coalition agreement's statement on immigration too negative towards refugees, and she called on her party to execute it as leniently as possible.

Having assisted previous campaigns, she first participated in an election for the European Parliament in 2019 as the eighth candidate on the shared list Christian Union – Reformed Political Party (CU-SGP). Kennedy was not elected as the party won two seats, but she did receive 6,776 preference votes – more than any other candidate on the CU-SGP list after the third spot. Kennedy previously criticized the Christian Union's 2009 decision to end its cooperation in the European Parliament with the Reformed Political Party (SGP). Her party had joined the European Conservatives and Reformists (ECR), while the SGP had been barred from entering the political group by the British Conservative Party due to the SGP's internal ban on women holding political offices. Kennedy wrote that she had cooperated well with the SGP and that the Conservative Party was exhibiting the same intolerance it was accusing the SGP of by not allowing the SGP to join. The SGP was eventually allowed in the ECR in 2014.

=== Senate and Provincial Council of Utrecht ===
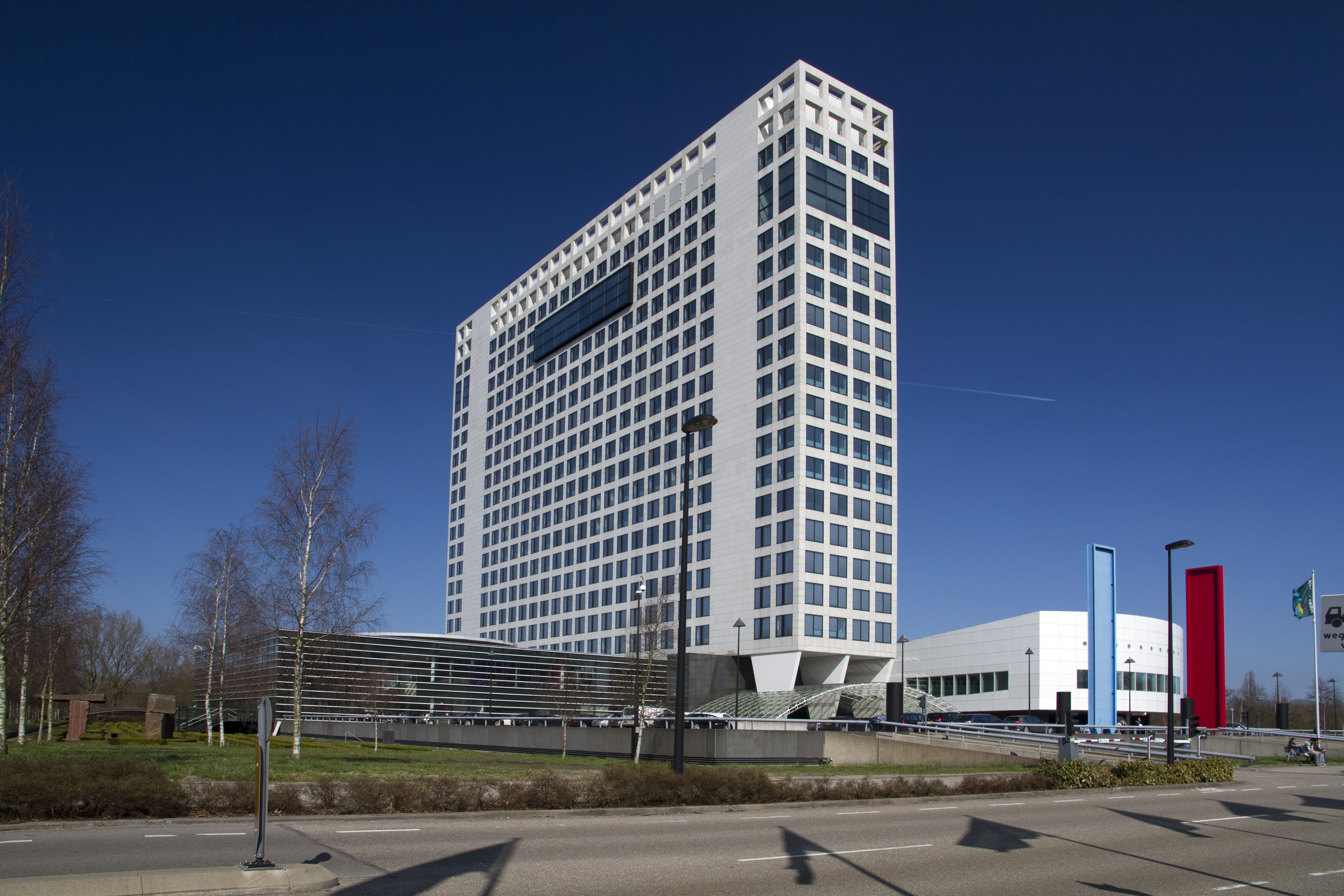
Seat of the Provincial Council of Utrecht

Kennedy was the Christian Union's sixth candidate in the May 2019 Senate election, her party receiving four seats. Following the death of Christian Union Senator Peter Ester on 11 December 2022, Kennedy was appointed as his successor due to her position on the party list during the last election. She was sworn into the Senate on 17 January 2023. Kennedy said that she would focus on helping vulnerable people in society, having a fair distribution of the tax burden, and preventing the government from interfering in the responsibilities of individuals and organizations.

She was elected to the Provincial Council of Utrecht in March 2023 when the Christian Union won three seats and Kennedy had been placed third on the party list, and she was installed on 29 March. Her Senate term came to an end after five months on 12 June 2023, as she had not run for re-election in May.

==== Senate committee assignments ====
- Committee on Finances
- Committee on Kingdom Relations
- Committee on Social Affairs and Employment

== Electoral history ==
Electoral history of Simone Kennedy
Year	Body	Party	Pos.	Votes	Result		Ref.
Year	Body	Party	Pos.	Votes	Party seats	Individual	Ref.
1994	Amsterdam municipal council	Reformed Political League	1	1,653	0	Lost	
2006	Amersfoort Municipal Council	Christian Union			3	Lost (Note: Kennedy was appointed to the body later during the term due to a vacancy.)	
2006	House of Representatives	Christian Union	12	369	6	Lost	
2010	Amersfoort Municipal Council	Christian Union	2	885	3	Won	
2010	House of Representatives	Christian Union	13	489	5	Lost	
2011	Senate	Christian Union	3	1 (Note: To account for population differences between provinces, a weighted vote total of 151 is used.)	2	Lost	
2012	House of Representatives	Christian Union	39	175	5	Lost	
2014	Amersfoort Municipal Council	Christian Union	1	4,064	5	Won	
2017	House of Representatives	Christian Union	22	748	5	Lost	
2018	Amersfoort Municipal Council	Christian Union	1	4,694	4	Won	
2019	European Parliament	Christian Union – Reformed Political Party	8	6,776	2	Lost	
2019	Senate	Christian Union	6	0 (Note: To account for population differences between provinces, a weighted vote total of 0 is used.)	4	Lost	
2021	House of Representatives	Christian Union	12	1,600	5	Lost	
2023	Provincial Council of Utrecht	Christian Union	3	3,874	3	Won	
2024	European Parliament	Christian Union	14	1,032	0	Lost	
2026	Amersfoort Municipal Council	Christian Union	18 (Note: Kennedy participated as a lijstduwer.)	123	2	Lost	
