= Robert Baljeu =

Dutch politician

Member of the Senate
- In office 15 December 2020 – 14 February 2021
- Preceded by: Hugo Berkhout
- Succeeded by: Annabel Nanninga

Member of the States of North Holland
- In office 28 March 2019 – 29 March 2023

Personal details
- Born: R.J.P. Baljeu; 19 June 1969 (age 57) Velsen, Netherlands
- Party: Group Otten
- Other political affiliations: Forum for Democracy (until 2019)
- Education: University of Amsterdam

Robert Jan P. Baljeu (born 19 June 1969) is a Dutch politician, who served as a temporary member of the Senate and as a member of the States of North Holland between 2019 and 2023. After he was expelled from the right-wing populist party Forum for Democracy (FvD) shortly after his election, he became a member of the splinter party Group Otten.

== Education and career ==
Baljeu was born in 1969 in the North Holland municipality Velsen. He studied psychology at the University of Amsterdam in the years 1992–95, but did not finish his studies. Subsequently, he worked for three years as an account manager at textile company Sikkes International and for two years as a field manager at International Computers Limited. In 2000, he took at job as a manager at ICT services company Getronics, but left to work as an account manager for HR software company Raet between 2003 and 2010.

Baljeu has been an independent HRM and ICT consultant since 2010, owning his own company called Turning Point.

== Politics ==
After joining Forum for Democracy, he became responsible for recruiting and training political candidates, especially for the 2019 provincial elections, in 2016. The following year, he also became the director of Forum for Democracy's party office. Baljeu himself also participated in the March 2019 provincial election as the second candidate on the FvD's party list in North Holland, and he was elected to the States of North Holland with 7,779 preferential votes.

=== Expulsion and Senate election ===
On 14 May 2019 – less than two months after joining the States of North Holland – he was expelled from the Forum for Democracy caucus after all other members had lost confidence in Baljeu. The caucus leader said the reason was an internal matter. His paid position as recruiter had come to an end shortly before. Baljeu had been an ally of Forum for Democracy co-founder Henk Otten, who had been sidelined a few weeks earlier. In an interview after his expulsion, Baljeu said Forum for Democracy had a "culture of fear" and criticized a group within the party that according to him was flirting with the alt-right. He decided to keep his seat in the States of North Holland and continued as a one-man caucus, causing Forum for Democracy to lose its position as the largest party in the province.

Baljeu appeared fifteenth on the Forum for Democracy party list for the Senate election held on 29 May. His candidacy had already been finalized before his expulsion. Forum for Democracy received twelve seats, and Baljeu was not elected. He had voted for Henk Otten, while all FvD members from North Holland had voted for the sixteenth candidate, Hugo Berkhout. NH reported that this was probably an attempt to prevent Baljeu from winning a seat.

=== Group Otten and senator ===
When Henk Otten, then a senator, was being expelled from Forum for Democracy in July 2019, the party released a press release saying, among other things, that it suspected that Otten had tried to commit fraud. Baljeu's consultancy company supposedly charged €29,000 for activities that had not occurred to claim government subsidies. Otten, who confirmed that the payment had happened, said that the claims constituted defamation as Baljeu had done work for that money. Baljeu subsequently joined Otten's splinter party Group Otten and became a staffer of the Senate caucus and a board member. That party merged with the Party for the Future in June 2020, but continued again under the name Group Otten after Henk Krol had left the party in October. Baljeu remained a member of the board throughout this period.

Baljeu was sworn in as senator on 15 December 2020 as Hugo Berkhout's replacement. Berkhout had served as a temporary senator during Annabel Nanninga's maternity leave, but became the permanent replacement of Paul Cliteur after his resignation, leaving a vacant seat for Baljeu. He was a member of the Committees for Education, Culture, and Science and for Health, Welfare, and Sport. Nanninga returned from her leave on 15 February 2021, bringing an end to Baljeu's term. He still had his seat in the States of North Holland until the 2023 provincial elections, when Group Otten did not participate. Near the end of the term, NOS and regional broadcasters featured Baljeu in an article about the most absent members of provincial councils. The article noted that Baljeu had been absent during 20 out of 50 meetings, making him the second most absent provincial council member in the country.

He ran for the Amsterdam municipal council as the second candidate of Group Otten in the 2022 municipal elections, but the party did not win any seats.

== Personal life ==
Baljeu was a resident of the Dutch capital Amsterdam during his term in the Senate.
