= Baljeu =

Baljeu is a surname. Notable people with the surname include:

- Jeannette Baljeu (born 1967), Dutch politician
- Joost Baljeu (1925–1991), Dutch painter, sculptor and writer
- Robert Baljeu (born 1969), Dutch politician
