= Femke Merel van Kooten =

Dutch politician

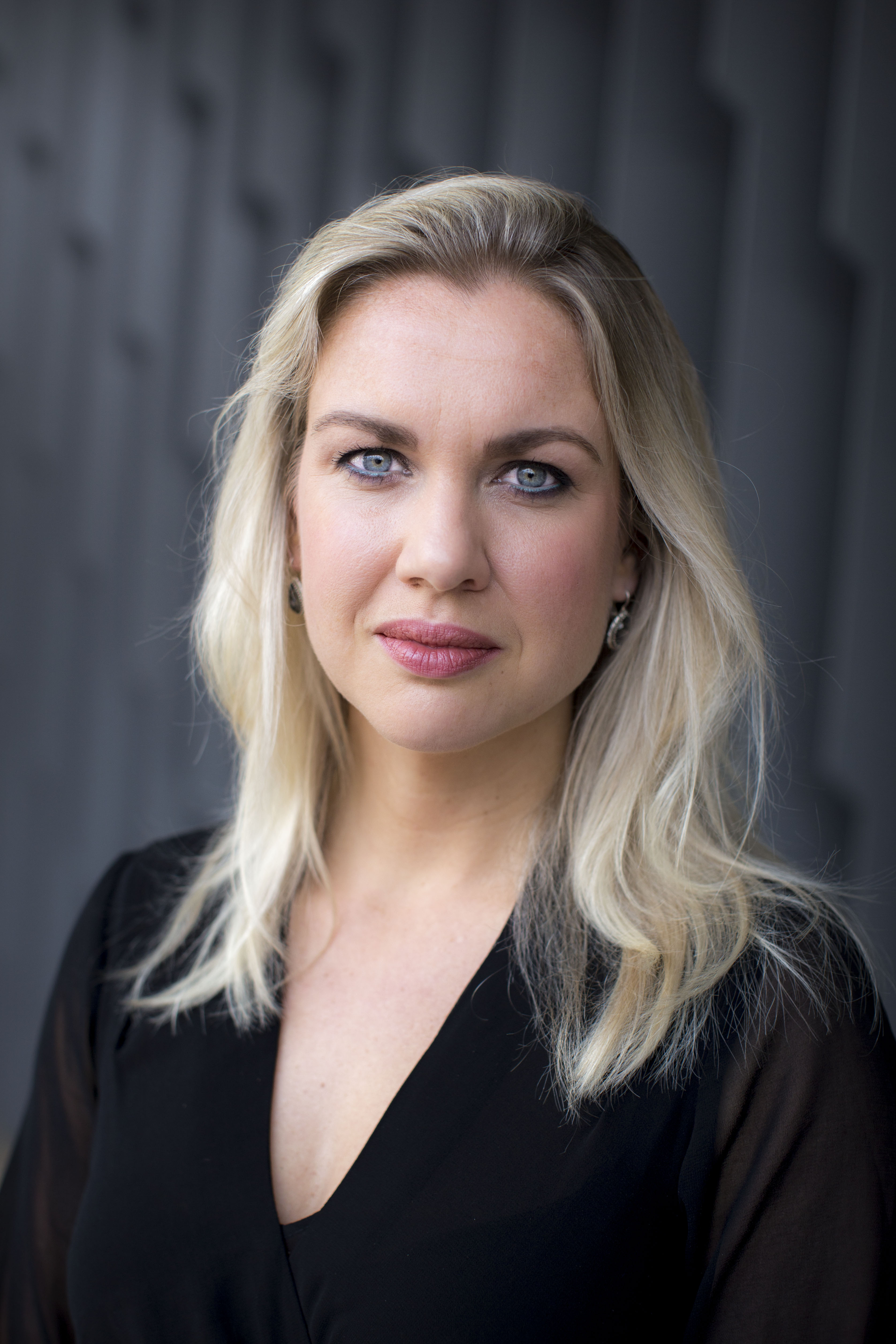
- Femke Merel van Kooten-Arissen in 2017

Municipal Councilor in Woerden
- Incumbent
- Assumed office 30 March 2022

Member of the House of Representatives
- In office 4 February 2019 – 31 March 2021
- In office 23 March 2017 – 15 October 2018

Member of the Provincial Council of Utrecht
- In office 26 March 2015 – 4 February 2019

Personal details
- Born: Femke Merel Arissen; 9 November 1983 (age 42) Huizen, Netherlands
- Party: Splinter (since 2020)
- Other political affiliations: Party for the Animals (2003–2019); Party for the Future (2020)
- Education: Utrecht University (Bachelor of Laws)

Femke Merel van Kooten-Arissen (pronounced [ˈfɛmkə ˈmeːrəl vɑŋ ˈkoːtən ˈaːrɪsə(n), -tə ˈʔaː-]; née Arissen; born 9 November 1983) is a Dutch politician and former member of the House of Representatives.

== Political career ==
=== Party for the Animals ===
Van Kooten served as a member of the Provincial Council of Utrecht for the Party for the Animals (PvdD) from 26 March 2015 until 4 February 2019.

She was first elected in the 2017 general election. From 15 October 2018 to 4 February 2019, she was on maternity leave from Parliament.

=== Independent MP and Party for the Future ===
On 16 July 2019, she left the PvdD and became an independent MP. In December 2019, she joined 50PLUS but remained an independent member of parliament. She left 50PLUS in May 2020 along with its leader Henk Krol, forming the Party for the Future (PvdT).

After about three months, in early August 2020, she left the PvdT in opposition to its merger with the Otten Group (GO), a party formed by former members of the far-right Forum for Democracy (FvD). The merger had been arranged by Krol without her knowledge. Once again, she became an independent member of parliament, and remained so for the rest of the parliamentary term. The Party for the Future was eventually completely dissolved before the end of 2020.

=== Leader of Splinter ===
Ahead of the 2021 general election, van Kooten founded her own party named Splinter, and was the party's lead candidate. However, Splinter received only 30,000 votes, less than half of the 70,000 vote threshold required for a seat. As a result, she did not return to the House of Representatives.

As Splinter's lead candidate, Van Kooten was elected to the municipal council of Woerden in the 2022 municipal election, taking office on 30 March of that year. She attempted to return to the House of Representatives in the 2023 general election, but her party received 13,000 votes and won no seats.

== Electoral history ==
Electoral history of Femke Merel van Kooten
Year	Body	Party	Pos.	Votes	Result		Ref.
Year	Body	Party	Pos.	Votes	Party seats	Individual	Ref.
2015	Provincial Council of Utrecht	Party for the Animals			2		
2017	House of Representatives	Party for the Animals	5	6,131	5	Won	
2021	House of Representatives	Splinter	1	27,301	0	Lost	
2022	Municipal council of Woerden	Splinter	1	882	1	Won	
2023	House of Representatives	Splinter	1	9,461	0	Lost	
