= Anne-Marie Mineur =

Dutch politician (born 1967)

Anne-Marie Mineur MEP
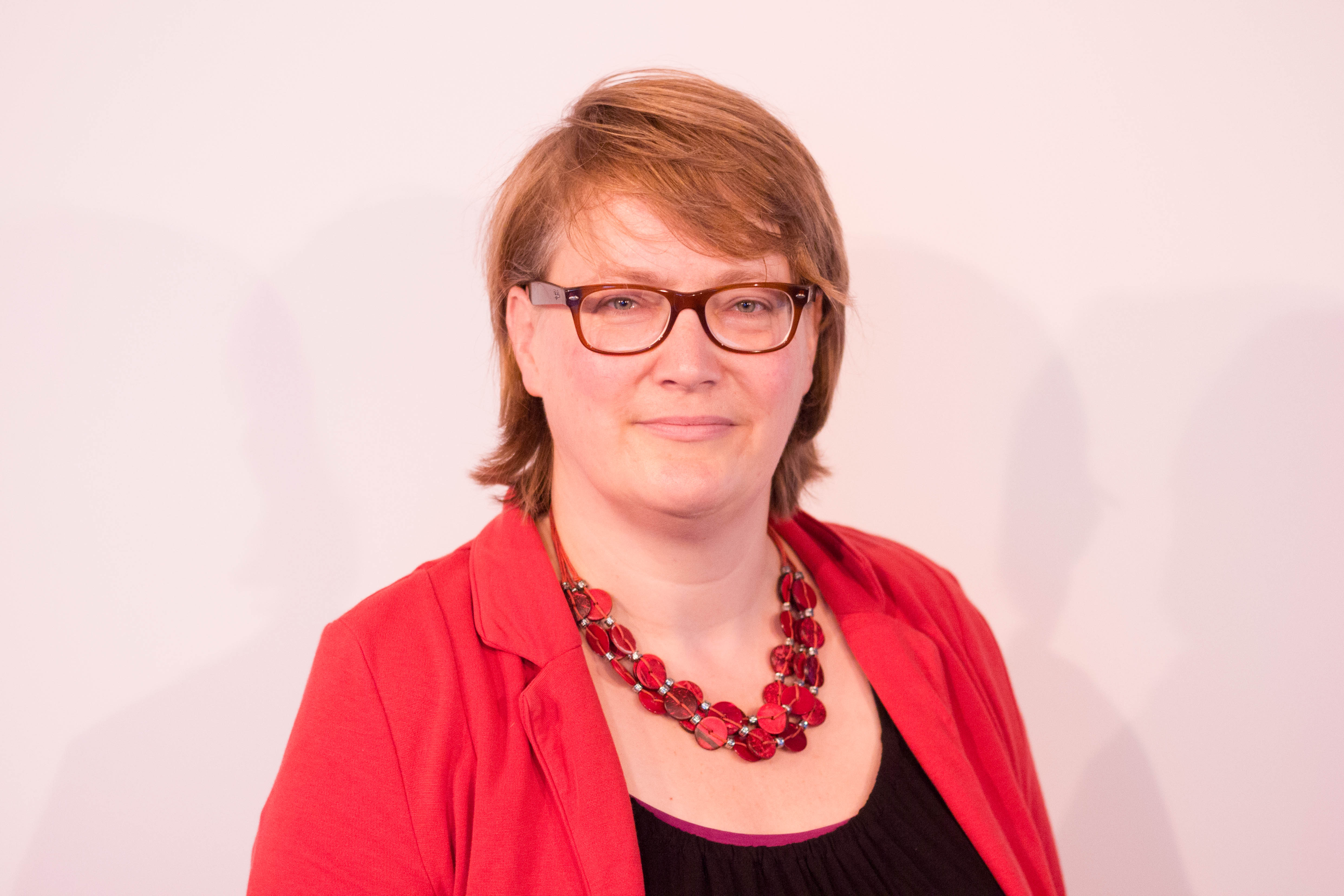

Member of the European Parliament
- In office 1 July 2014 – 2 July 2019
- Constituency: Netherlands

Member of the States of Utrecht
- In office 11 March 2011 – 1 July 2014

Personal details
- Born: 14 May 1967 (age 59) Oss, Netherlands
- Party: Socialist Party; European United Left–Nordic Green Left
- Education: Utrecht University; Saarland University

Anne-Marie Mineur (born 14 May 1967) is a Dutch politician who was Member of the European Parliament (MEP) for the Netherlands between 2014 and 2019. She is a member of the Socialist Party, part of the European United Left–Nordic Green Left in the European Parliament. Previously Mineur was municipal councillor in De Bilt (2006–2012) and member of the States of Utrecht (2011–2014).

== Career ==
Mineur was born on 14 May 1967 in Oss, where she would also receive her primary and secondary education. She graduated high school in 1986 and then started studying speech and language-technologies at Utrecht University. In 1989–1990 she went on exchange to the University of Essex and she graduated from Utrecht University in 1992. From 1993 to 1997 she went to Saarland University to study computational linguistics. Mineur was a researcher at the German Research Centre for Artificial Intelligence between 1996 and 1997. In 1998 she returned to Utrecht University to become a researcher until 2004, she would move on that year to the University of Groningen to become a researcher and lecturer.

== Political career ==
Mineur joined the Socialist Party in 2003 and in 2006 she became member of the municipal council of De Bilt, where she would serve until 2012. By March 2011 she concurrently became member of the States of Utrecht, which she would stay until she became member of the European Parliament on 1 July 2014. In the States of Utrecht she was party leader.

== European Parliament ==
Mineur occupied the third place on the Socialist Party list for the European Parliament elections of 2014, the party obtained two seats with Mineur elected on the basis of 52,000 preferential votes. Hereby she won the seat over Eric Smaling. In her campaign she criticized the transfer of competences over issues such as pensions and social rent to the European Union.

In the European Parliament she was member of the Committee on International Trade and member of the Delegation to the Cariforum — EU Parliamentary Committee. Her term in office ended on 2 July 2019.

== Electoral history ==
Electoral history of Anne-Marie Mineur
Year	Body	Party	Pos.	Votes	Result		Ref.
Year	Body	Party	Pos.	Votes	Party seats	Individual	Ref.
2014	European Parliament	Socialist Party	3	52,187	2	Won (Note: Mineur received enough preference votes to be elected despite her party's result.)	
2015	Provincial Council of Utrecht	Socialist Party	33	500	4	Lost	
2019	Provincial Council of Utrecht	Socialist Party	28		2	Lost	
2021	House of Representatives	Socialist Party	46	127	9	Lost	
2002	De Bilt Municipal Council	Socialist Party	29			Lost	
2024	European Parliament	Socialist Party	7	1,370	0	Lost	
2025	House of Representatives	Socialist Party	38	252	3	Lost	
2026	De Bilt Municipal Council	Socialist Party	28 (Note: Mineur participated as a lijstduwer.)	8	1	Lost	
