= Simone Kennedy =

Simone Kennedy may refer to:

- Simone Kennedy (cyclist) (born 1994), Australian Paralympic cyclist
- Simone Kennedy (politician) (born 1970), Dutch Christian Union politician
