= Doornbos =

Doornbos is a Dutch surname. Notable people with the surname include:

- Erika Doornbos (born 1956), Dutch curler
- Robert Doornbos (born 1981), Dutch racing driver

== See also ==
- Simone Kennedy-Doornbos (born 1970), Dutch politician
