= Hugo Berkhout =

Member of the Dutch Senate

Member of the Senate
- In office 26 October 2020 – 13 June 2023
- Preceded by: Annabel Nanninga

Duoraadslid in the Amsterdam municipal council
- In office 27 June 2018 – 1 April 2019

Personal details
- Born: H.A. Berkhout; 9 April 1974 (age 52) Beesd, Netherlands
- Party: JA21
- Other political affiliations: Forum for Democracy (until November 2020)
- Children: 1

Hugo A. Berkhout (born 9 April 1974) is a Dutch currency specialist and politician. He served as a member of the Senate between October 2020 and June 2023. There, he represented the conservative and right-wing populist party Forum for Democracy until he stepped out of the party the following month amidst an internal crisis. He later joined the splinter party JA21.

== Non-political career ==
Berkhout was born in the Gelderland village of Beesd and studied at an Amsterdam university. He subsequently worked for Delta Lloyd Bank as a fixed income manager and FX trader. Beside his job, he served as treasurer of the Dutch chapter of the industry body ACI Financial Markets Association and as head of the treasury committee of the self-regulatory organization Dutch Securities Institute, both in the years 2011–19.

Between February 2017 and March 2019, he was ALM/liquidity/FX trade director at Amsterdam Trade Bank, a subsidiary of Alfa-Bank. Thereafter, he moved to the Cypriot municipality Strovolos to lead the treasury and financial institutions department of financial technology company iSignthis at their operations center. In November 2020, he took a job as partner investments and treasury services at Kylla Corporate Transactions in Amsterdam.

== Politics ==
A member of Forum for Democracy, Berkhout was on an advisory council to select candidates for the 2017 general election and also was on the party list himself (place 21). During the 2018 Amsterdam municipal election, he appeared on place eleven on the party list, but he did not receive a seat. Berkhout was appointed duoraadslid in the Amsterdam municipal council by his party in June 2018. He was on the finances and economic affairs committee and continued to serve in that position until April 2019.

Berkhout was placed sixteenth on the party list of Forum for Democracy in the 2019 Senate election. His party won twelve seats, and Berkhout was elected because he received eight preferential votes. However, Berkhout declined the seat. All of his votes came from the Forum for Democracy members of the States of North Holland. Broadcasting station NH reported that they probably voted for him to prevent the fifteenth candidate, Robert Baljeu, from being elected, as he had been expelled from the party.

=== Senator (2020–2023) ===
When Senator Annabel Nanninga went on parental leave in 2020, Berkhout was installed as temporary senator on 26 October. A crisis broke out within Forum for Democracy in late November, when newspaper Het Parool published an article about extremist messages in WhatsApp groups of the party's youth organization. On 27 November, fellow Forum for Democracy Senator Bob van Pareren posted a statement on Twitter on behalf of himself and three other senators including Berkhout, in which they announced that they would leave the party. They said they did not want to be part of "a party that does not distance itself from racism, antisemitism, and Nazism and that does not listen to criticism". Berkhout officially left the Forum for Democracy caucus on 29 November and joined Fractie-Van Pareren (renamed Fractie-Nanninga in February 2021). He also became the treasurer of his caucus.

Berkhout became a permanent senator – as opposed to a temporary senator – on 15 December 2020, replacing Paul Cliteur, who had resigned due to the crisis at Forum for Democracy. Fractie-Van Pareren announced on 24 December that they would join the new party JA21, that had been founded by two politicians who had left Forum for Democracy. Berkhout ran for re-election in 2023 as the 18th candidate of JA21. The party won three seats, causing Berkhout's membership of the Senate to end on 13 June.

=== Parliamentary committees ===
While a temporary senator:

- Committee for Immigration and Asylum/Justice and Home Affairs Council
- Committee for Infrastructure, Water Management, and Environment
- Committee for Kingdom Relations
- Committee for Education, Culture, and Science

While a permanent senator:

- Committee for Economic Affairs and Climate Policy/Agriculture, Nature and Food Quality
- Committee for Finances
- Committee for Kingdom Relations
- Committee for Social Affairs and Employment

== Personal life ==
He lives in The Hague, is married, and has a daughter.
