= Jan Albrecht =

Jan Albrecht may refer to:

- Jan Philipp Albrecht (born 1982), German politician
- Jan Albrecht (biochemist) (born 1944), Polish professor
