= Jan Albrecht (biochemist) =

Polish biochemist and neuroscientist

- Born: June 22, 1944 (age 82); Warsaw
- Education: University of Warsaw
- Occupations: biochemist, professor, habilitated doctor of medical sciences

Jan Albrecht (born June 22, 1944, in Warsaw) is a Polish professor of medical science, biochemist, cytologist, neurobiologist.

== Career ==
In 1966, he graduated from the Faculty of Biology at the University of Warsaw. Then (1966–1970), he did postgraduate studies at the Institute of Biochemistry at Leiden University. In 1976–1978 he was a research intern in Rochester (Minnesota), USA. He specializes in issues in medical biology. He conducts research on the mechanisms of neurotransmitter dysfunction in hepatic encephalopathy and the role of glutamine in glioma development. He became a correspondent member in 2007 and a full member of the Polish Academy of Sciences in 2019. He is also an active member of the Polish Academy of Arts and Sciences and the Warsaw Scientific Society. A research fellow at the Mirosław Mossakowski Institute of Experimental and Clinical Medicine of the Polish Academy of Sciences, he has served on the Central Commission for Degrees and Titles.

He received his doctorate in 1970 from Leiden University and was habilitated ten years later. He was awarded the rank of professor of medical sciences in 1992.

He has been honored several times with the "Champion" subsidy award of the Foundation for Polish Science. In 2006, he received the Prime Minister's Award for Outstanding Scientific Achievement, and in 2021 Scientific Award of the President of the Polish Academy of Sciences for special achievements.

In 2011–2014, he was a member of the Presidium of the Polish Academy of Sciences and chairman of the Board of Trustees of Division V of the Medical Sciences of the Polish Academy of Sciences.
