= Henk Otten =

Dutch politician and economist (born 1967)

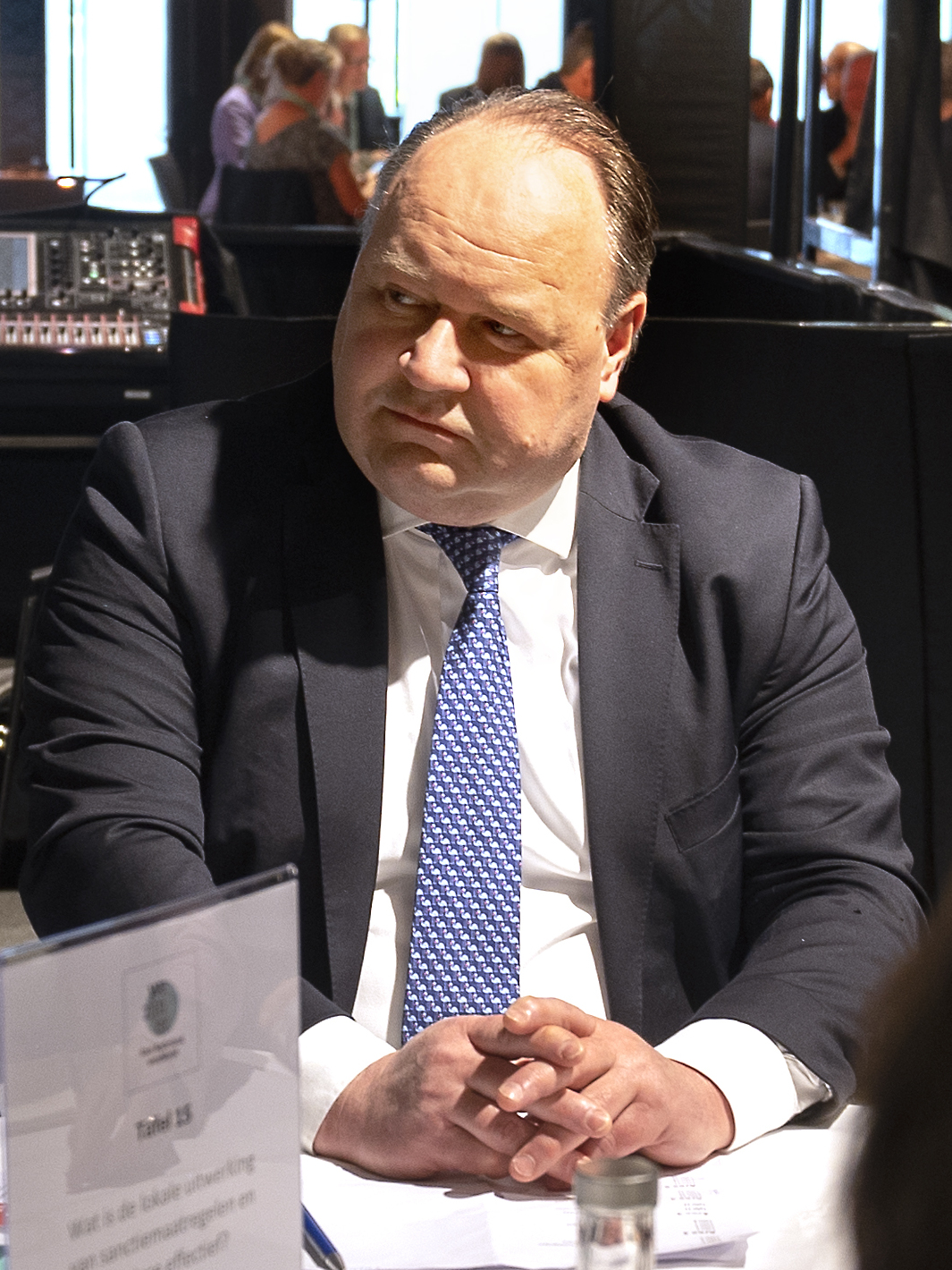
- Otten in 2022

Member of the Senate
- In office 11 June 2019 – 13 June 2023

Personal details
- Born: Henk Otten; 30 May 1967 (age 59) Assen, Netherlands
- Party: Group Otten
- Other political affiliations: Party for the Future (2019); Forum for Democracy (2016–2019); Pim Fortuyn List (2002)
- Children: 2

Henk Otten (born 30 May 1967) is a Dutch politician and economist. He was a member of the Senate from June 2019 until June 2023. He was the co-founder of the party Forum for Democracy (FvD) along with Thierry Baudet. He served as FvD treasurer from 2016 to 2019.

Otten was also chairman of the permanent Senate Committee on Finance. He held that position on behalf of the FvD faction until 28 July 2019; since then he has formed his own faction in the Senate which he registered as a political party called Group Otten.

== Biography ==
Otten grew up on his parents' farm. He studied economics and law at the University of Groningen before going to work for Rabobank in Hong Kong. From 1999 to 2002, he also worked for Lehman Brothers in London.

=== Political career ===
Otten was a member of the Pim Fortuyn List for a short time. In 2015, he founded the think-tank Forum for Democracy (FvD) together with Thierry Baudet and others. Its main goal was campaigning in the 2016 Dutch Ukraine–European Union Association Agreement referendum and against Dutch membership of the EU. FvD later registered as a political party, after which Otten became party treasurer in the FvD's executive board and a party secretary to the two-member House of Representatives faction (Theo Hiddema and Baudet) from 2017 to 2019.

In February 2018, members of the FvD complained that Otten led the party apparatus in a dictatorial way and demanded more internal democracy. However, Baudet initially sided with Otten. In April 2019, he stood down from the party board after it was found he had transferred money from party donors to his own consultancy company without permission. Although he later returned the money at the party's request, the incident prompted Otten to resign as a board member. However, he formally remained the party's lead candidate for the 2019 elections to the Senate but Paul Cliteur was appointed to take over as the FvD Senate spokesperson. Otten was subsequently elected to the Senate.

Otten was formally expelled from the FvD on 24 July 2019 due to financial malpractices and for making critical statements of Baudet's leadership. He subsequently disputed some of the allegations as slander and claimed his expulsion was as a result of his criticism of what he regarded as Baudet's controversial statements on social media and aggressive leadership style (which Otten attributed to the FvD's difficulty in forming coalitions in Provincial Councils) rather than financial disputes.

Otten formed his own faction in the Senate and expressed interest in forming a new political party. He held talks with Henk Krol and his Party for the Future and subsequently became the party's chairman. He later registered his senate faction as a political party Group Otten and Party for the Future was merged into this. Otten was joined in his new party by fellow former FvD politicians Robert Baljeu and Dorien Rookmaker.

== Personal life ==
Otten is married with two children.
