= Splinter (political party) =

Dutch political party

- Leader: Femke Merel van Kooten
- Founded: 21 December 2020; 5 years ago
- Dissolved: March 2026; 8 months ago
- Split from: Party for the Future
- Ideology: Anti-identity politics Secularism
- Colours: Purple
- Senate: 0 / 75
- House of Representatives: 0 / 150
- European Parliament: 0 / 29
- Woerden municipal council: 1 / 31

Website
- splinterpolitiek.nl

Splinter was a political party in the Netherlands. It was founded in December 2020 by Femke Merel van Kooten, who led it and served as its lead candidate in the 2021 general election. It had a secular and social liberal ideology. It was dissolved in March of 2026.

== History ==
The party was founded in December 2020 by Femke Merel van Kooten, who had been an independent member of the House of Representatives since 16 July 2019. She was first elected for the Party for the Animals in the 2017 election.

The party's logo is a multi-colored phoenix, a mythical creature reborn from its own ashes over and over again. It is a reference to the COVID-19 pandemic from which the Netherlands will have to resurrect, but the phoenix also symbolizes the political career of Van Kooten.

In 2020, the party was offered a 250,000 Euro donation by a Russian citizen, Vadim Belikov, a co-founder of the Night Wolves movement. The party rejected it and notified Dutch security services.

The party participated in the 2021 general election, but did not receive enough votes for a seat in the House of Representatives. In the 2022 municipal elections, Splinter won a seat in the municipal council of Woerden, which was taken up by Van Kooten.

== Structure and ideology ==
Splinter claimed to be characterized by a "flat" party structure. Via its member platform Fractiekamer, members are able to comment directly on the election program, and to submit motions and amendments.

The party had a social liberal and secular ideology. It stated that religious expressions and freedoms that restrict others in their expressions and freedoms must not be tolerated.

== Electoral results ==
=== House of Representatives ===
Election	Lead candidate	Votes	List	%	Seats	+/–	Government
2021	Femke Merel van Kooten	List	30,328	0.29	0 / 150	New	Extra-parliamentary
2023	Femke Merel van Kooten	List	12,838	0.12	0 / 150	0	Extra-parliamentary
