= Bart Jan Spruyt =

Dutch historian and journalist (born 1964)

Dr. Bastian Jan "Bart Jan" Spruyt (born 29 January 1964, in Ridderkerk) is a Dutch historian, journalist and conservative writer. He is opinion editor for CNE.news.

== Early life and education ==
Spruyt grew up in Rotterdam, Netherlands, and studied history, theology, and law at Utrecht University and Leiden University. He is a practising Calvinist of the Hersteld Hervormde Kerk denomination, also known as the Restored Reformed Church. Spruyt obtained his M.A. in Renaissance and Reformation History in 1990 from Utrecht with the highest honors.

Spruyt was a graduate student at Leiden University from February 1991 through February 1994 and obtained a doctorate in February 1996 on an English-language dissertation entitled 'Cornelius Henrici Hoen (Honius) and his Epistle on the Eucharist (1525): Medieval Heresy, Erasmian Humanism and Reform in the Early Sixteenth-Century Low Countries', which was supervised by Prof. Posthumus Meyjes (Leiden) and the late Prof. Heiko A. Oberman (Arizona). A book version of this dissertation was published in 2006 by E. J. Brill in their series 'Studies in Medieval and Reformation Traditions: History, Culture, Religion, Ideas'. Spruyt published scholarly papers in such journals as the Dutch Review of Church History, Sixteenth Century Journal, Wolfenbütteler Renaissance Mitteilungen, English Historical Review, Quaerendo, and Reformatorica. He's currently an assistant professor at the Free University of Amsterdam, where he teaches ecclesiastical history.

== Career ==
=== Journalism ===
From 1994 to 2002, Spruyt worked as a journalist for the Reformatorisch Dagblad, the sixth largest Dutch daily newspaper, with a mainly Protestant readership and an explicitly Calvinist editorial line. He covered Dutch politics and the foreign desk. His last position was from 2000 to 2002 as chief political editor and commentator of the newspaper, working from The Hague. In the second half of 2006, he picked up journalistic work again.

=== Think tank director ===
As one of the leading voices of intellectual conservatism, Spruyt was instrumental in founding the Edmund Burke Foundation, the Dutch conservative group, in the second half of 2000. Together with conservative activist Joshua Livestro, Spruyt became the Foundation's director when the Foundation opened up its own offices in The Hague. Livestro soon left the Foundation and Spruyt was managing director for three years. In that period, he openly sought to emulate the American conservative movement, taking the Intercollegiate Studies Institute, The Heritage Foundation, and the American Enterprise Institute as his leading examples. Under his leadership, the Foundation worked to make the legacy of such conservative politicians as Ronald Reagan relevant to the Dutch political climate. To that end, the Burke Foundation called for significant budget cuts, tax cuts (especially of income tax) including the implementation of a flat tax, health care reform, and welfare reform. The Foundation also defended the Bush administration's war on terror, argued for increased defence spending, stronger American-European links, and played a major role in the Dutch campaign against the European Constitution in June 2005. The Foundation also had a more philosophical and student-focused program. During parts of 2004 and 2005 Spruyt, among other prominent Dutch intellectuals, had to hire private security services, given the bad political climate in the Netherlands following the murder of Theo van Gogh.

=== Politics ===
When Dutch politician Geert Wilders started a conservative party in 2004, Spruyt supported that move, hoping that it could spur a movement inspired on the basis of American conservatism. From January through August 2006, Spruyt advised Wilders on political strategy. In August, however, he announced that he was disappointed with the development of the nascent Wilders party and would not stand as a parliamentary candidate on the Wilders slate. Spruyt believed that Wilders should have formed a broad conservative front with other politicians like Marco Pastors (of Leefbaar Rotterdam) and Joost Eerdmans (of the LPF). But Wilders did not want to cooperate, the Dutch right splintered, and Spruyt decided to end his brief political career after six months. Spruyt has since criticized Wilders for being too radical.

After leaving politics, Spruyt entered a life as an independent consultant, journalist, teacher, writer and speaker. Spruyt continues to contribute widely to Dutch magazines and newspapers on a broad array of topics. In April 2006, Spruyt delivered the second Roosevelt Study Centre Lecture in Transatlantic Relations in Middelburg on the topic "The Defence of the West: Neoconservatism and the continuing need for new Churchills." He blogs at Bart J. Spruyt Blog. He writes for HP De Tijd and Binnenlands Bestuur. In 2008, he was named the successor of Pim Fortuyn as the columnist for Elsevier, a Dutch weekly magazine. He continues to be chairman of the Edmund Burke Stichting.

=== Academics ===
In September 2009, Spruyt began teaching civics and history at Wartburg College's Guido de Brès school in Rotterdam.
