= James Kennedy (historian) =

American historian (born 1963)

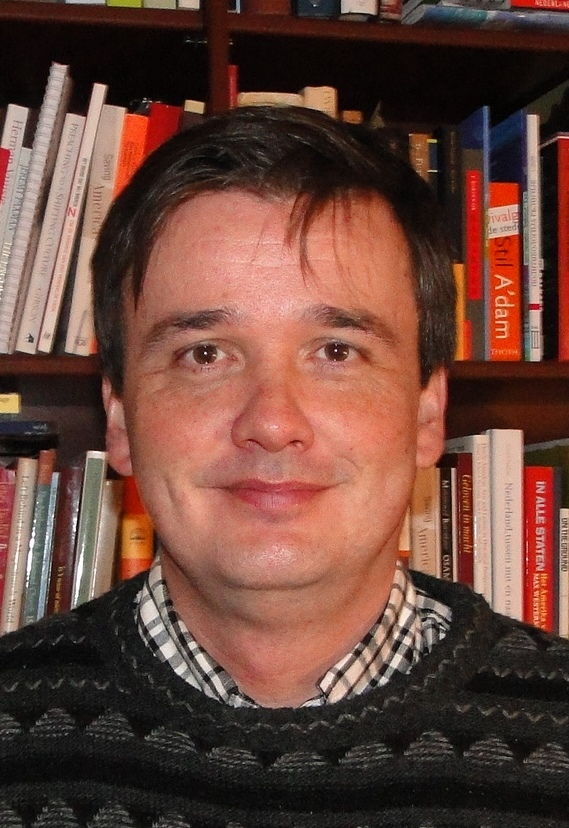
- Born: James Carleton Kennedy; 1963 (age 62–63); Orange City, Iowa, U.S.
- Education: Georgetown University (BS); Calvin Theological Seminary (MA); University of Iowa (PhD)
- Occupation: Historian
- Spouse: Simone Jeanet Doornbos
- Children: 3

James Carleton Kennedy (born 1963) is an American historian. He is the son of E W Kennedy, who was a professor of religion at Northwestern College, and Nella Kennedy.

== Biography ==
Kennedy was born and grew up in Orange City, Iowa, a Reformed village with a large portion of the population having roots in Netherlands. His mother is a Dutch-born immigrant.

He studied foreign service at Georgetown University, obtaining his B.S. in 1986, Christian studies at Calvin Theological Seminary in Grand Rapids, Michigan, obtaining his M.A. in 1988, and took his PhD in history from the University of Iowa in 1995.

He performed several jobs in the field of history before becoming an assistant professor of European history and research fellow at the A. C. Van Raalte Institute, Hope College in Holland, Michigan in 1997.

In 2003, Kennedy moved to the Netherlands because he was appointed a professor of modern history (20th century) at the Vrije Universiteit Amsterdam. In 2007 he changed to the University of Amsterdam, where he became a professor of the history of the Netherlands. In 2007 he succeeded Professor Piet de Rooy, head of the section of the history of the Netherlands. Between October 1, 2015, and December 2020, Kennedy was Dean of University College Utrecht.

Kennedy takes a special interest in post-war Dutch history. Because of his Christian belief he considers himself a Christian historian although he is reserved to point out how God is guiding human history.

Politically, he characterizes himself as an independent. However, in the presidential campaign of 2004 he was in favor of John Kerry, the presidential candidate of the Democrats.

James Kennedy is married to Simone Kennedy-Doornbos, a Dutch politician for the Christian Union, who has been serving as a Senator since 2023. They have three children. The Kennedy family is a member of the Reformed Churches in the Netherlands (Liberated), an orthodox reformed denomination.

Since 2021 he has been writing biweekly columns in the Dutch newspaper Trouw.

== Bibliography ==
- Building new Babylon: cultural change in the Netherlands during the 1960s (1995, dissertation), translated in Dutch as Nieuw Babylon in aanbouw: Nederland in de jaren zestig, Amsterdam, Boom, 1995)
- History of the Low Countries (New York, Berghahn Books, 1999), adapted translation from the Geschiedenis van de Nederlanden, Hans Blom and Emiel Lamberts, 1993)
- Een weloverwogen dood. De opkomst van de euthanasie in Nederland (Amsterdam, Bakker, 2002) - about the development of euthanasia in the Netherlands
- Bezielende verbanden. Gedachten over religie, politiek en maatschappij in het moderne Nederland (Amsterdam, Bakker, 2009)
- Stad op een berg. De publieke rol van protestantse kerken (Zoetermeer, Boekencentrum Uitgevers, 2010)
- A Concise History of the Netherlands (Cambridge, Cambridge University Press, 2017)
- Aan Het Werk (Amsterdam, Prometheus, 2021)
