= Otten Group =

Otten Group Groep Otten
- Abbreviation: GO
- Leader: Henk Otten
- Leader in the Senate: Henk Otten
- Founder: Henk Otten
- Founded: 23 October 2019
- Split from: Forum for Democracy
- Ideology: Conservative liberalism; Economic liberalism; Open government; Direct democracy; Euroscepticism
- Political position: Centre-right to right-wing
- Colors: Yellow; Navy blue
- Senate: 0 / 75
- House of Representatives: 0 / 150
- Provincial councils: 0 / 570
- European Parliament: 0 / 29

Website
- go2021.nl

The Otten Group (Dutch: Groep Otten, GO) was a political party in the Netherlands. It was formed following an internal conflict between Henk Otten, former treasurer and board member of Forum for Democracy (FvD), and its leader Thierry Baudet.

== History ==
=== Internal conflicts within Forum for Democracy ===
After the establishment of Forum for Democracy in 2016, Otten and Baudet devoted themselves to the party's development. Shortly after its founding, the party managed to win two seats in the 2017 Dutch general election. Further efforts led to a decisive victory two years later in the 2019 Dutch provincial elections, but the party was not able to form a coalition in any province. The parties involved blamed Baudet. His statements about social issues had been viewed by many as far-right, racist and misogynistic; some of his tweets were also controversial.

On 19 April 2019, Otten stepped forward in an interview with Dutch newspaper NRC Handelsblad. In the interview, Otten criticised the party's course and Baudet's behaviour. The party leader was "not amused" by this public criticism.

A few days later, two of the party's three board members, Baudet and Rob Rooken, accused Otten of taking money from the party treasury. The money in question was immediately deposited back to the party account by Otten. Otten resigned as a party member at the request of the other board members. During this period, Otten opted for media silence to prevent further harm to the party. In the 2019 Dutch senate election, Otten was the party's lead candidate and intended group chairman. After the conflict, Otten renounced the group chairmanship. He was succeeded by Paul Cliteur, with whom he entered the Senate (together with ten brand new members of the Dutch parliament).

Owing to suspicions of financial malpractices, Otten was expelled from the party on 24 July 2019. Otten immediately visited the media to speak out against the accusations, which he dismissed as defamation, slander. He claimed it was due to disagreements about the direction of the party. Otten also promised to make a declaration weigh defamation. In Dutch news program Nieuwsuur, Otten hinted at his further political aspirations with the possibility of establishing his own party for the first time.

=== Founding of the Otten Group ===
On 18 August 2019, Otten officially set up the new party. He was still looking for a suitable name for the party, but it would continue as fractie-Otten for the time being. Two members of the Senate, former party spokesman Jeroen de Vries and Dorien Rookmaker, joined him because of the same dissatisfaction with the party's course. The three chose to keep their seats. There was even a possibility that the Otten Group could get a seat in the European Parliament, as the seats in the parliament were redistributed after Brexit. The number of seats of FvD then increased from three to four seats. As Rookmaker was fourth on the Forum's candidates list for the 2019 European Parliament election, she still claimed the "Brexit seat" despite her canceled membership. Rookmaker joined the European Parliament on 1 February 2020.

The situation in the provincial states was equally uneasy. Some members of the provincial states canceled their membership after expressing their dissatisfaction with the direction of FvD. Some even chose to join Otten's party, including North Holland member of the states Robert Baljeu. In an interview with the NOS, Otten said that he was expecting more FvD members to join his party.

== Policies and beliefs ==
On its website and initial policy platform, Group Otten declared its main beliefs to be based on a "Triple-E" philosophy which stands for "Effective, Honest and Efficient" (Effectief, Eerlijk en Efficiënt in Dutch). The party called for more direct democracy, a smaller and less cumbersome but more focused government, and political transparency. It also stood for more rational politics over what it described as legislation created by "emotional debates" in the House of Representatives, and wished to prioritize the interests of Dutch citizens.

== Representation ==
=== Former members of the Senate ===
- Henk Otten, parliamentary leader (2019–2023)
- Jeroen de Vries (2019–2023)
- Dorien Rookmaker (2019–2020)
- Robert Baljeu (2020–2021)

=== Former members of the European Parliament ===
- Dorien Rookmaker (2020–2021)

=== Former provincial council members ===
- Flevoland: Cornelis van den Berg
- Groningen: Jeroen de Vries
- North Holland: Robert Baljeu
- South Holland: Caroline Persenaire

== See also ==
- Party for the Future
- JA21
