= Jalta.nl =

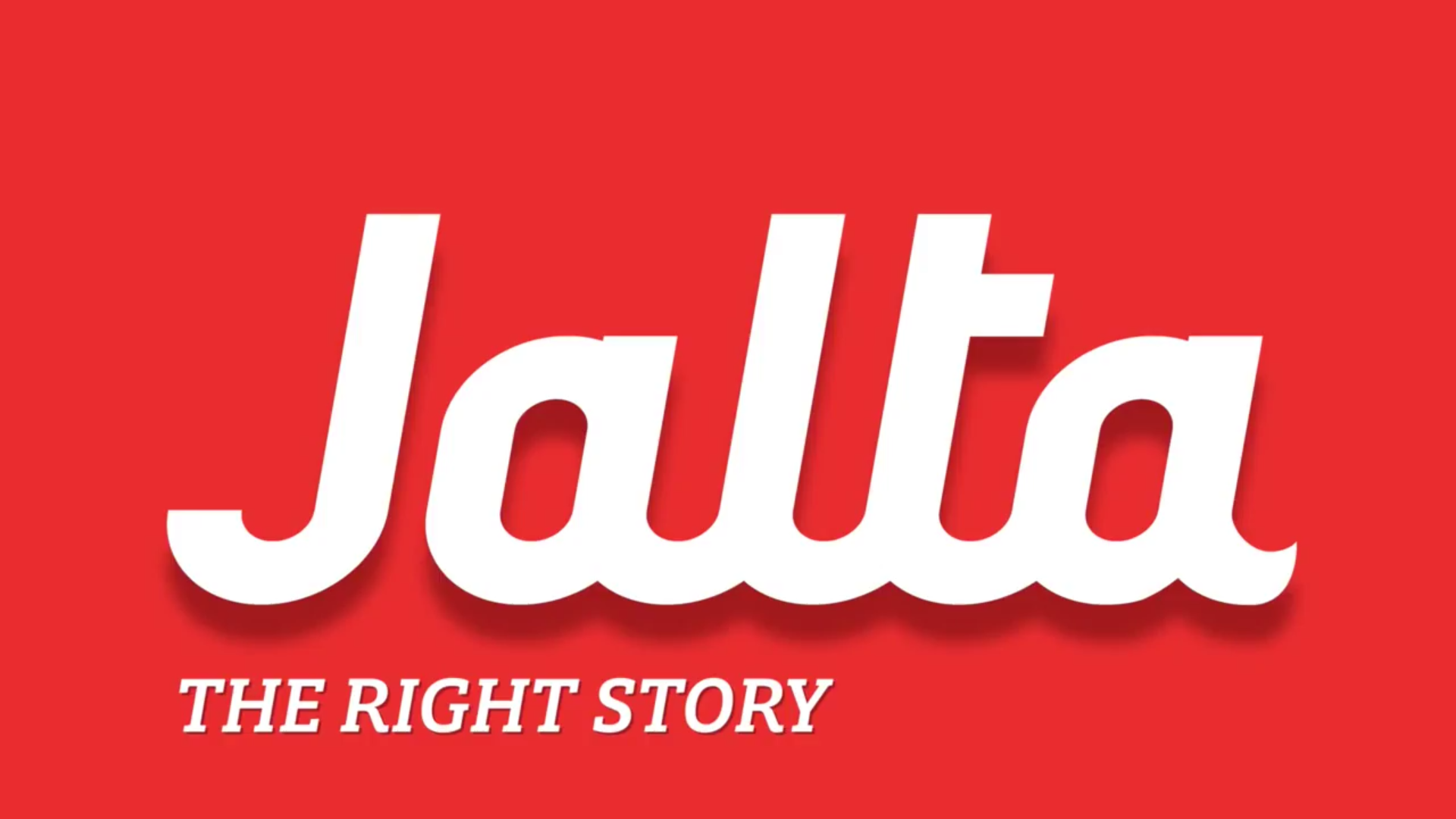
- Website type: Online political analysis, news and opinion platform
- Available in: Dutch
- Owner: Joshua Livestro
- Website: http://www.jalta.nl/
- Commercial: Yes
- Launched: 18 September 2014
- Current status: Active

Jalta.nl (or simply Jalta) is a Dutch right-wing online political analysis, news, and opinion platform, launched on 18 September 2014.

== History ==
Jalta.nl was founded in 2014 by Joshua Livestro and Annabel Nanninga with the goal of mounting "a forward defence of the West's values against Putin and Erdogan's dictatorial sophism and the open contempt of fundamentalists" (of IS). The name Jalta refers to the Yalta Conference (February 1945), where the conflicting interests of West and East were at play.

In September 2015, Boudewijn Geels from Villamedia Magazine wrote that the political climate was favorable for a right-wing blog, but that Jalta (which includes "freethinkers who aren't necessarily 'right-wing' writers") could barely take advantage of this opportunity because of its business model; the paywall prevented the attraction of many potential readers. In April 2015, Bert Brussen from ThePostOnline (TPO), too, said that, in the long term, "I don't think paywall sites like Jalta and De Correspondent are business models", although Geels remarked it did work in the latter case, and thus was possible. In June 2016, the staff decided to switch from a paywall model to a donator model using the Stichting Jalta. With six members, the core staff was smaller than it was during its launch, and it was supported by 20 to 21 employees, who published an average of 2 to 3 new articles a day at that time.

Nanninga left for TPO in December 2015. She was succeeded as managing editor by Esther Voet (previously editor-in-chief at Nieuw Israëlietisch Weekblad), who later became a regular columnist, leaving the position of managing editor vacant for a while. In July 2016, Voet described Jalta.nl as "a place for a variety of opinions, to the right of D66", and that this "poses a counterweight against initiatives such as Joop.nl and De Correspondent". However, she and Bart Schut left after an incident with Livestro. With the departure of these religiously conservative voices, the tone of Jalta became somewhat less right-wing. After rearranging the editorial staff, Livesto called "the spread of arguments from the far-left (anti-globalisation, anti-free trade, anti-NATO, anti-EU) to the right-wing camp" the most dangerous development of the first half of 2016, saying that he wanted to "combatively" take these on with Jalta, "although our arguments will preferably be made calmly and factually".

The new managing editor Ewout Klei (previously a contributing editor to De Vrijdenker) summarised the website's position in January 2017 as follows: "Using the written word, Jalta defends the democratic Rechtsstaat against its enemies. Self-evidently, terrorists are our enemies, but so are far-right extremists who, invoking the defence of Western civilisation, are trying to bring about its downfall. The foundation of our Western civilisation is not the so-called Judeo-Christian culture – although positive elements from Christianity and Judaism have certainly shaped our civilisation – but the Enlightenment."

In June 2017, Livestro took up a position against what he called "downfall thinking", which rose remarkably right-wing circles in 2016. This attitude was propagated by right-wing opinion makers, including some of his former Jalta employees who allegedly "radicalised" since 2015. Their story is that Western civilisation and its population will be destroyed by mass immigration, organised by a conspiracy of "the elite", and that this doomsday scenario could only be averted through violent counter-action. Livestro characterised these ideas as a "dangerous post-rational, racist discourse" full of "obscure conspiracy stories and all-explaining delusions". "This cannot go on any longer: these views are unacceptable, so they need to be fought," he concluded.

== Editorial staff ==
=== Core staff ===
- Joshua Livestro (editor-in-chief)
- Ewout Klei (managing editor)
- Rik de Jong
- Karin Nullamento

=== Notable former employees ===
- Thierry Baudet
- Frits Bolkestein
- Nausicaa Marbe
- Annabel Nanninga (managing editor)
- Bart Schut
- Bart Jan Spruyt
- Esther Voet
- Hafid Bouazza
