= Joost Baljeu =

Dutch painter, sculptor and writer

- Born: 2 November 1925; Middelburg, Netherlands
- Died: 1 July 1991 (aged 65); Amsterdam, Netherlands
- Occupations: Artist, author
- Known for: Steel structures, articles on new art, books about artists

Joost Baljeu (1 November 1925 – 1 July 1991) was a Dutch painter, sculptor and writer. He is known for his large outdoor painted steel structures and his book on Theo van Doesburg.

== Life ==
Joost Baljeu was born in Middelburg on 1 November 1925. During World War II (1939–45) he began painting in an expressionist, realistic and semi-abstract idiom. After Cubism he evolved to constructivism. He made his first reliefs in 1954-55. From 1957 to 1972 he was a professor at the Royal Academy of Art, The Hague in the Hague. The Canadian artist Eli Bornstein began to make three-dimensional "structurist" reliefs during a sabbatical in Italy and the Netherlands in 1957. He met and was influenced by artists such as Jean Gorin, Anthony Hill, Kenneth Martin, Mary Martin, Victor Pasmore and Georges Vantongerloo.

In 1958-59 Baljeu was a guest lecturer at the University of Saskatchewan in Canada. In 1966 he was visiting professor at the Minneapolis School of Art in the US. He died on 1 July 1991 in Amsterdam.

== Work ==
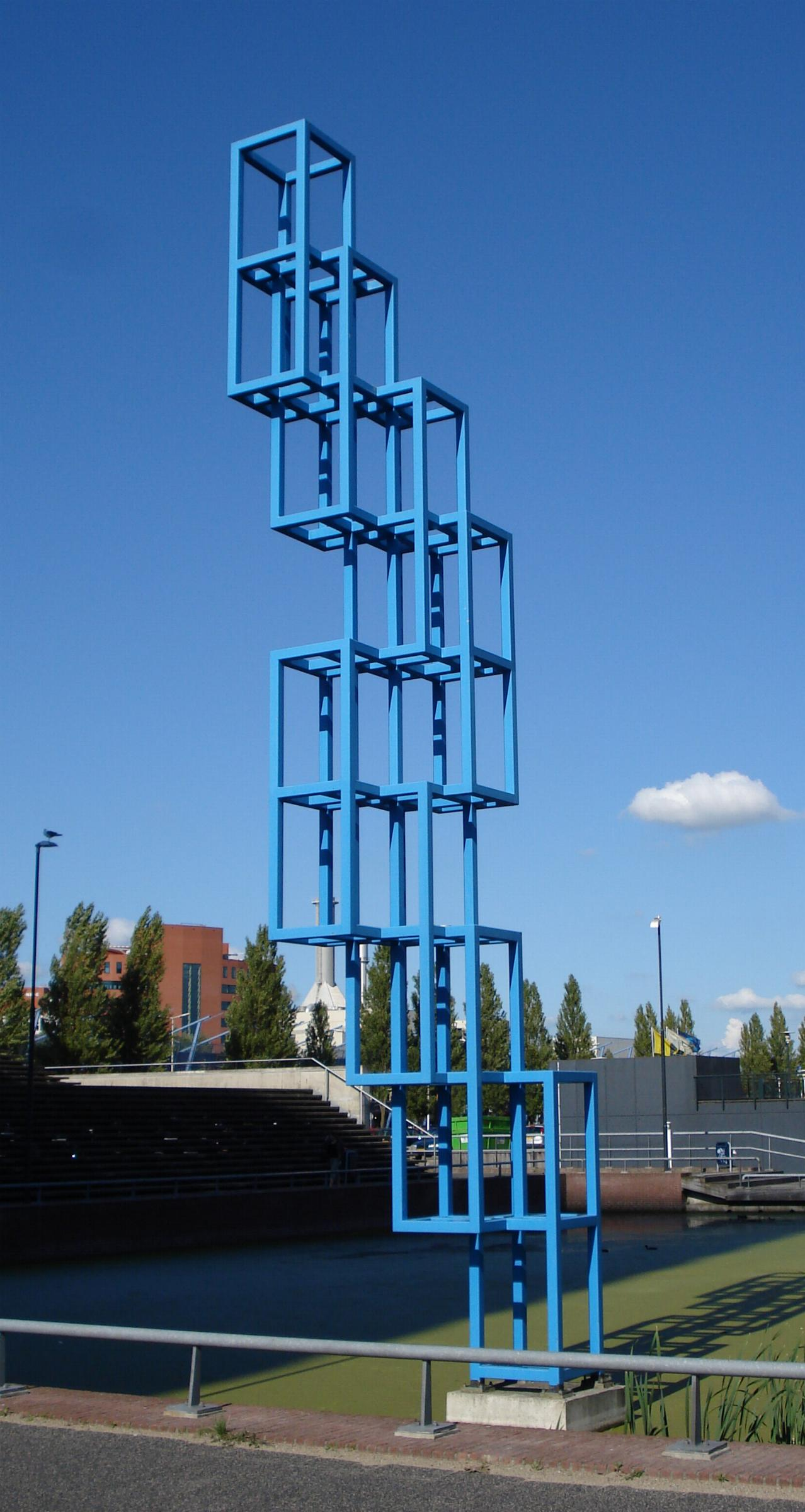
Space Time I in Rotterdam

=== Exhibitions ===
- 1965 Zonnehof, Amersfoort
- 1975/1976 Gemeentemuseum, The Hague
- 1979 Kröller-Müller Museum, Otterlo
- 1991 Stedelijk Museum, Amsterdam
- 2000 Steel in Picture (group) in Old Slot Heemstede: F19 (model 1986/87)

=== Museums ===
- The Mondriaan House in Amersfoort
- Kröller-Müller Museum in Otterlo. Two works are part of the museum:
  - Synthetic Construction F5-2 CD (1966/68) and
  - Synthetic Construction F15 No. 1. (1983/87),

The Sculpture F26 1990 was donated to the museum in 1991 by Baljeu's widow.

=== Public spaces ===
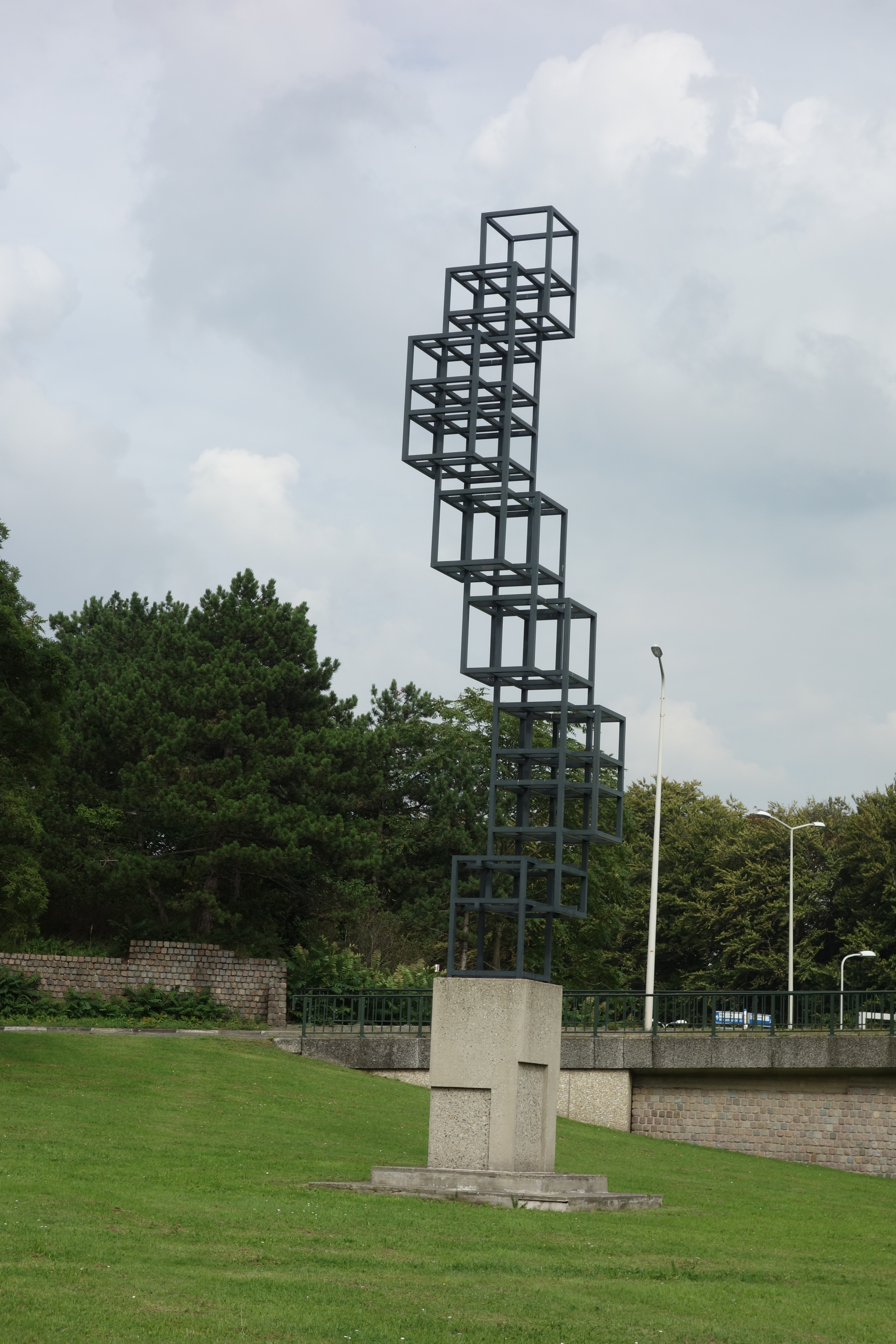
Synthetic construction F8-1B, The Hague

- Lightning (1955), Wijkcentrum Open Vaart, Meidoornplein in Amsterdam-Noord
- Synthetic construction F8-1B (1978), Plesmanweg, The Hague
- Wall sculpture (1980), police Burg. Wegstapel Square in Zoetermeer (architectural design of colored plexiglass panels in a two-story aluminum construction)
- Synthetic construction F11 (1981), courtyard Vest in Dordrecht - reinstated in 1999
- Synthetic construction F13 (1984), Avenue of the United Nations in Dordrecht - reinstated in 1999
- F26 (1990) in the sculpture park of the Kröller-Müller Museum in Otterlo
- Spacetime (I) (1989) in Rotterdam, Prince Alexander district
- Spacetime II (restored in 2004) in Rotterdam, Prince Alexander

=== Publications ===
- Mondrian or Miró (1958): book published by De Beuk, Amsterdam
- Structure (1958-1964): editor of a journal on new art
- Attempt at a theory of synthesist plastic expression (1963): book published by Alec Tiranti, London
- Theo van Doesburg (1974): book published by Studio Vista, London
