= Peter Ester =

Dutch sociologist and politician (1953–2022)

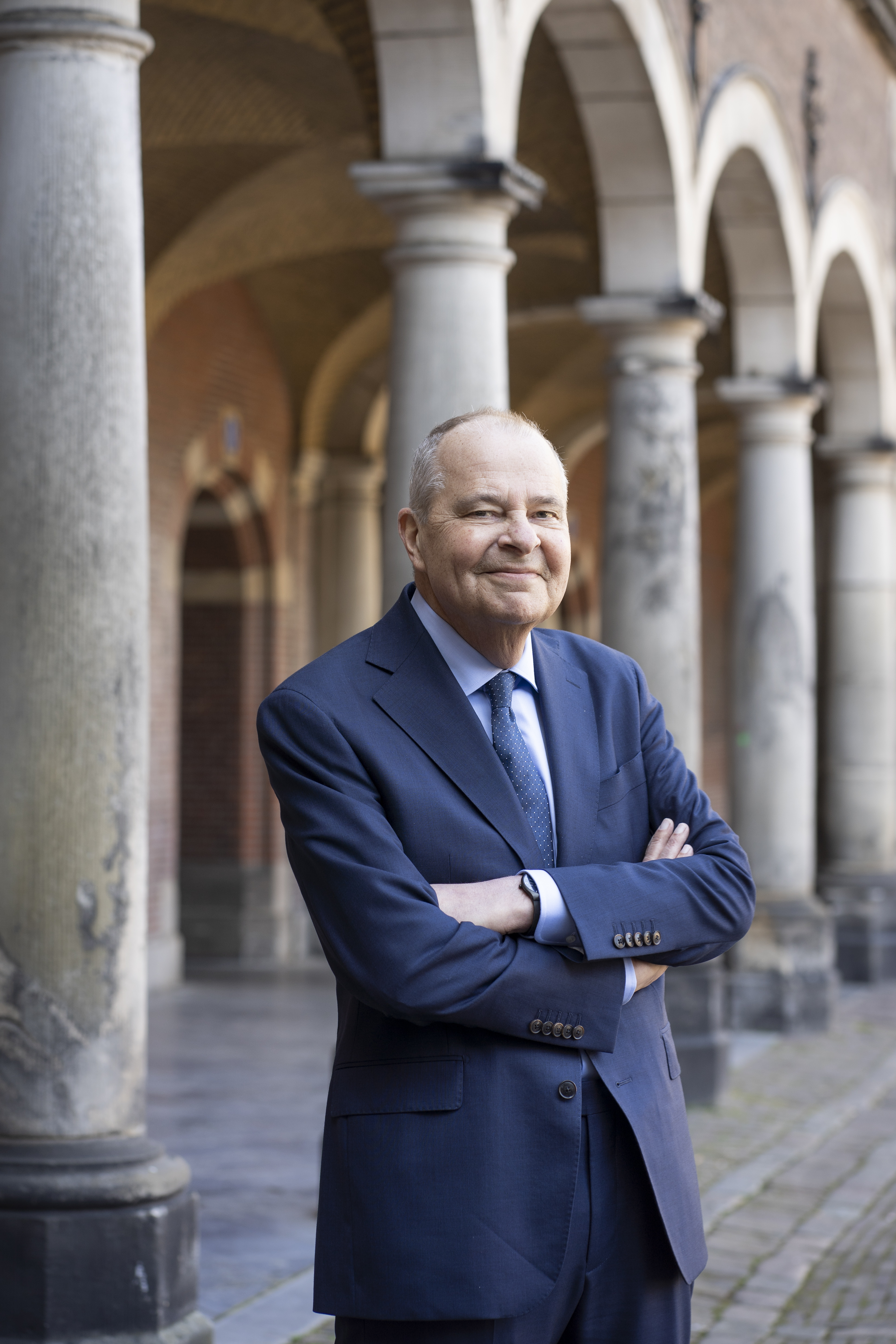

Member of the Senate
- In office 7 June 2011 – 11 December 2022

Personal details
- Born: 5 June 1953 Utrecht, Netherlands
- Died: 11 December 2022 (aged 69)
- Party: Christian Union
- Education: Utrecht University (MA, sociology), Erasmus University Rotterdam (PhD)
- Occupation: Politician, sociologist

Peter Ester (5 June 1953 – 11 December 2022) was a Dutch sociologist and politician. As a member of the Christian Union he was a member of the Senate from 7 June 2011 until his death. He focused on matters of economic affairs, agriculture, social affairs and employment, finance, infrastructure, natural environment and Kingdom relations.

Ester studied sociology at Utrecht University and got promoted in economics at Erasmus University Rotterdam.

Among others he worked at Vrije Universiteit (Free University Amsterdam), Tilburg University and Utrecht University.

Ester was married and a member of the Protestant Church in the Netherlands (PKN).

Ester died after a long illness on 11 December 2022, at the age of 69.
