= Party for the Future =

Party for the Future Partij voor de Toekomst
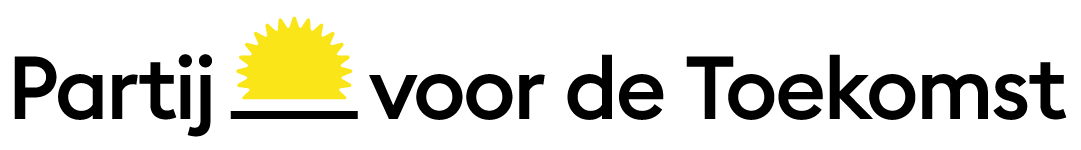
- Abbreviation: PvdT
- Leader: Henk Krol
- Chairperson: Henk Otten
- Founders: Henk Krol; Femke Merel van Kooten-Arissen
- Founded: 3 May 2020 (split from 50Plus); 28 June 2020 (merged with the Otten Group)
- Dissolved: 18 October 2020
- Succeeded by: Otten Group; Henk Krol List; Splinter
- Ideology: Liberalism; Direct democracy; Soft Euroscepticism
- Political position: Centre to centre-right
- Colours: Yellow

The Party for the Future (Dutch: Partij voor de Toekomst, [pɑrˈtɛi voːr də ˈtukɔmst]) was a short-lived political party in the Netherlands that had been active in the House of Representatives as the Krol/Van Kooten-Arissen Group (Dutch: Groep Krol/Van Kooten-Arissen). Founded in May 2020, it had intended to participate in the 2021 general election, but was dissolved in October 2020 due to internal disagreements.

== History ==
=== Foundation and merger with the Otten Group ===
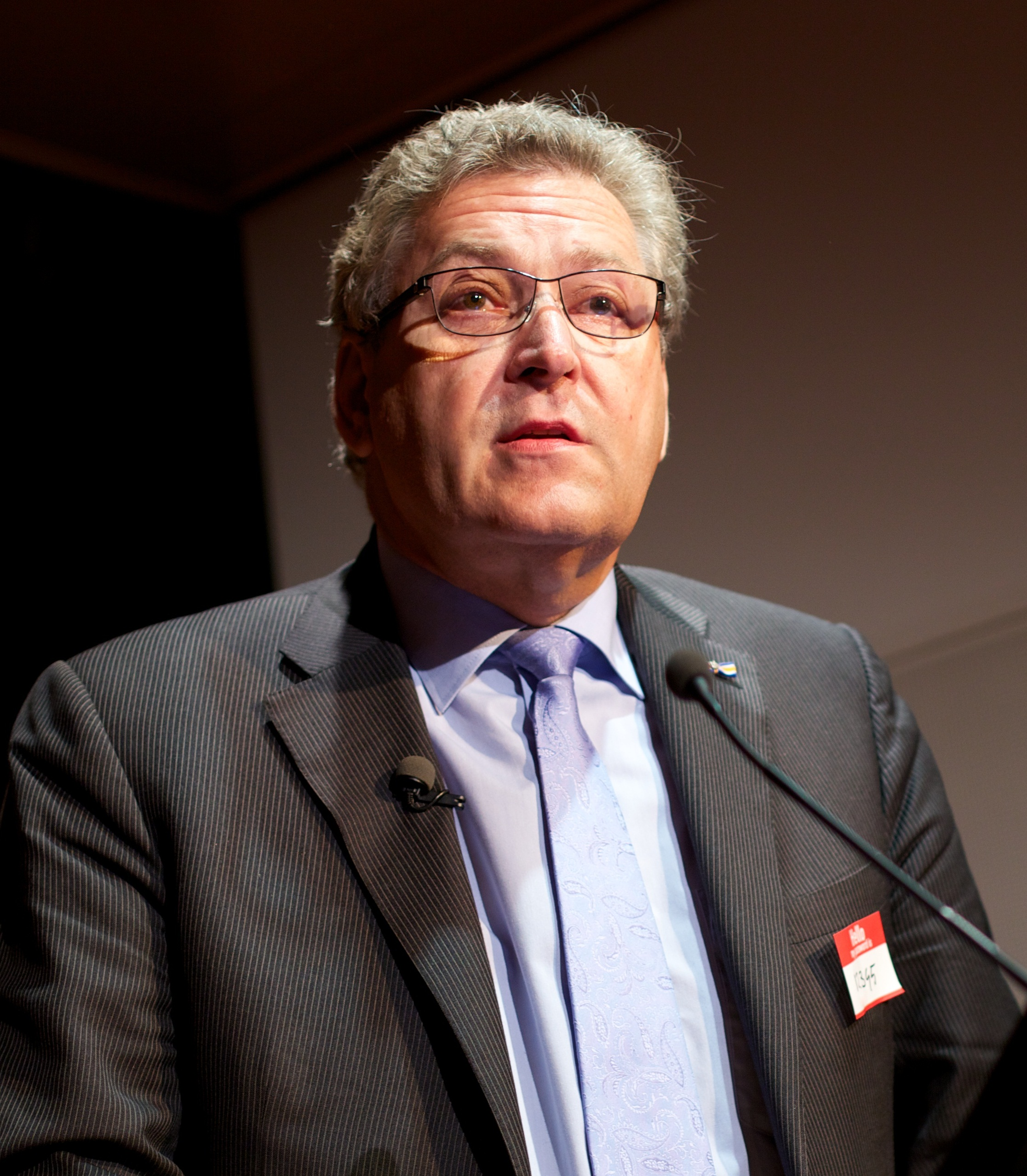
Henk Krol, co-founder and former party leader

The Party for the Future (PvdT) was founded on 3 May 2020 by independent members of the House of Representatives Henk Krol and Femke Merel van Kooten-Arissen. Krol had been the parliamentary leader of 50Plus since 10 September 2014, but left the party on 3 May 2020 following a dispute with the party board. Van Kooten-Arissen had been active as an independent MP since her departure from the Party for the Animals (PvdD) on 16 July 2019, and had become a member of 50Plus in December 2019.

Since the party was not formally elected into the House of Representatives, the name "Krol/Van Kooten-Arissen Group" (Dutch: Groep Krol/Van Kooten-Arissen) had to be used for the new parliamentary group formed by Krol and Van Kooten-Arissen. In June 2020, negotiations between the Krol/Van Kooten-Arissen Group and Senate members Henk Otten and Jeroen de Vries led to the merger of the Otten Group (GO), a party that split from Forum for Democracy, into the Party for the Future.

=== Departure of Van Kooten-Arissen and Krol ===
On 5 August 2020, Van Kooten-Arissen announced that she had ended her cooperation with Krol. She claimed to have been left out of the decision-making surrounding the merger with the Otten Group, and stated that she could not accept that Otten was to dictate the future policies of the party as its chairperson. As a result, the Krol/Van Kooten-Arissen Group was dissolved on 8 August 2020.

On 18 October 2020, co-founder and leader Henk Krol also left the party after a dispute with board members Otten and De Vries over the expulsion of the party's treasurer, and an intimidating text message sent by De Vries to one of Krol's employees. Initially, Otten had expressed his intention to continue using the name "Party for the Future", but later began using the name "Otten Group" again.

== See also ==
- VoorNederland
- Belang van Nederland
