= Toine Beukering =

Dutch politician (born 1958)

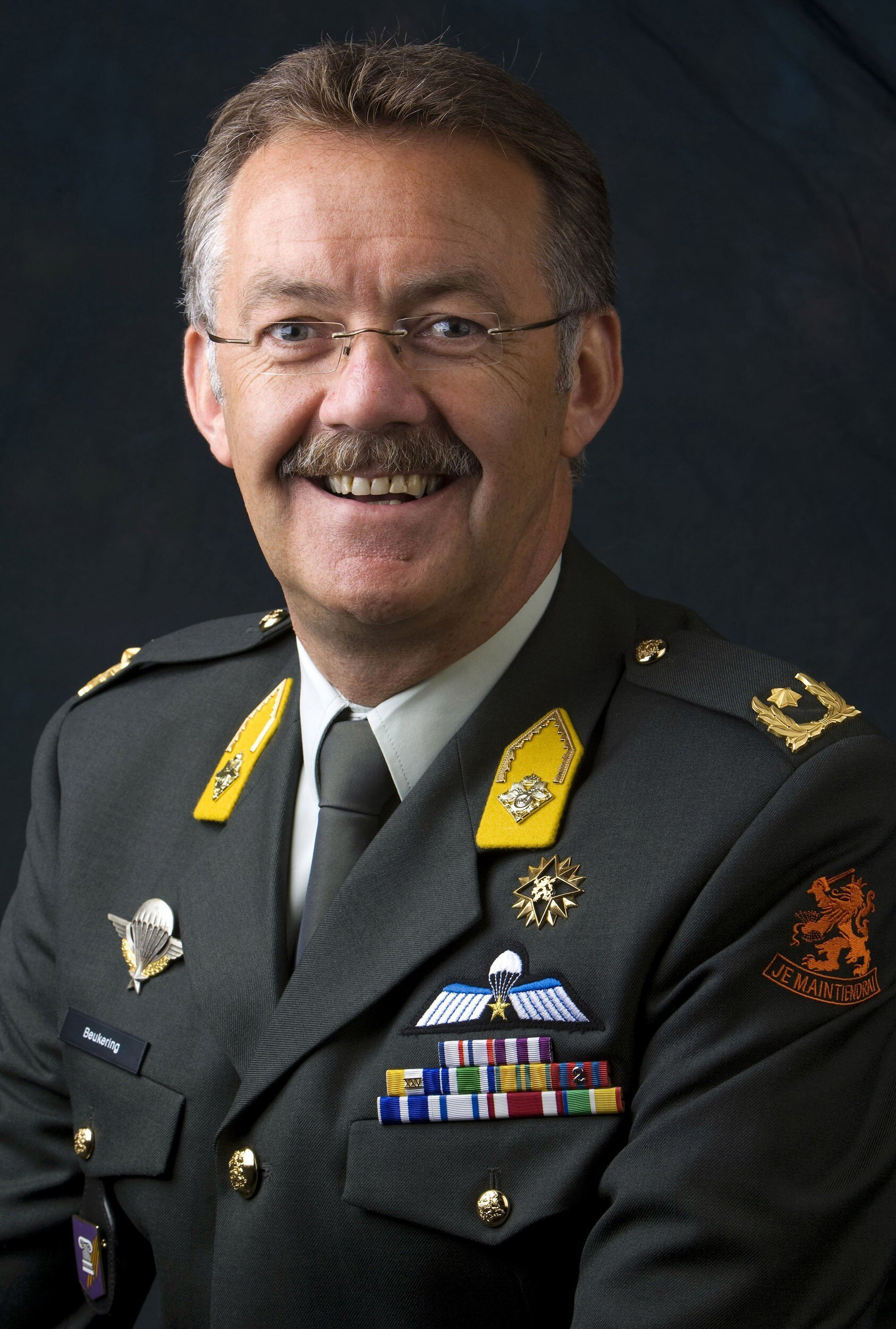
- Beukering in 2008

Member of the Senate
- Incumbent
- Assumed office 18 November 2025
- Preceded by: Annabel Nanninga
- In office 11 June 2019 – 12 June 2023

Member of the Provincial Council of South Holland
- Incumbent
- Assumed office 28 March 2019

Personal details
- Born: Antoine Beukering; 28 November 1958 (age 67) 's-Hertogenbosch, Netherlands
- Party: Hart voor Den Haag (since 2024)
- Other political affiliations: FvD (until 2020); JA21 (2020–2024)
- Occupation: Military officer; politician

Military service
- Allegiance: Netherlands
- Branch/service: Royal Netherlands Army
- Rank: Brigadier general

Antoine "Toine" Beukering (born 28 November 1958) is a Dutch retired military officer and politician who has served as a member of the Senate from 2025, having previously served between 2019 and 2023. He was originally affiliated with the Forum for Democracy (FvD) party, but switched to JA21.

Beukering served in the Royal Dutch Army and took part in peacekeeping operations in Burundi and the Ivory Coast. He first entered politics when he was elected to the Provincial Council of South Holland as a member of the FvD party and was subsequently appointed as a Senator. In 2020, he defected to the Van Pareren group which later became the Senate faction of the JA21 party. Beukering was placed fourth on JA21's candidate list in the 2023 Senate election, but failed to be re-elected. In 2024, he left JA21.

Beukering returned to the Senate on 18 November 2025 to fill the vacancy left by Annabel Nanninga, who had been elected to the House of Representatives. He formed a one-person parliamentary group, stating he would position himself as a "conservative representative".
