= Medical biology =

Field of biology

Medical biology is a field of biology that has practical applications in medicine, health care, and laboratory diagnostics. It includes many biomedical disciplines and areas of specialty that typically contains the "bio-" prefix such as:

- molecular biology, biochemistry, biophysics, biotechnology, cell biology, embryology,
- nanobiotechnology, biological engineering, laboratory medical biology,
- cytogenetics, genetics, gene therapy,
- bioinformatics, biostatistics, systems biology,
- microbiology, virology, parasitology,
- physiology, pathology,
- toxicology, and many others that generally concern life sciences as applied to medicine.

Medical biology is the cornerstone of modern health care and laboratory diagnostics. It concerned a wide range of scientific and technological approaches: from in vitro diagnostics to in vitro fertilisation, from the molecular mechanisms of cystic fibrosis to the population dynamics of HIV, from understanding molecular interactions to the study of carcinogenesis, from a single-nucleotide polymorphism (SNP) to gene therapy.

Medical biology based on molecular biology, combines all issues of developing molecular medicine into large-scale structural and functional relationships of the human genome, transcriptome, proteome and metabolome, with a particular focus on devising new technologies for prediction, diagnosis, and therapy.

== See also ==
- Biomedicine
- Laboratory diagnostics
- Medical chemistry
- Medical physics
- The Cancer Genome Atlas
- The Convention on Human Rights and Biomedicine
- The Human Genome Project
