= Joshua Livestro =

Dutch columnist and political writer (born 1970)

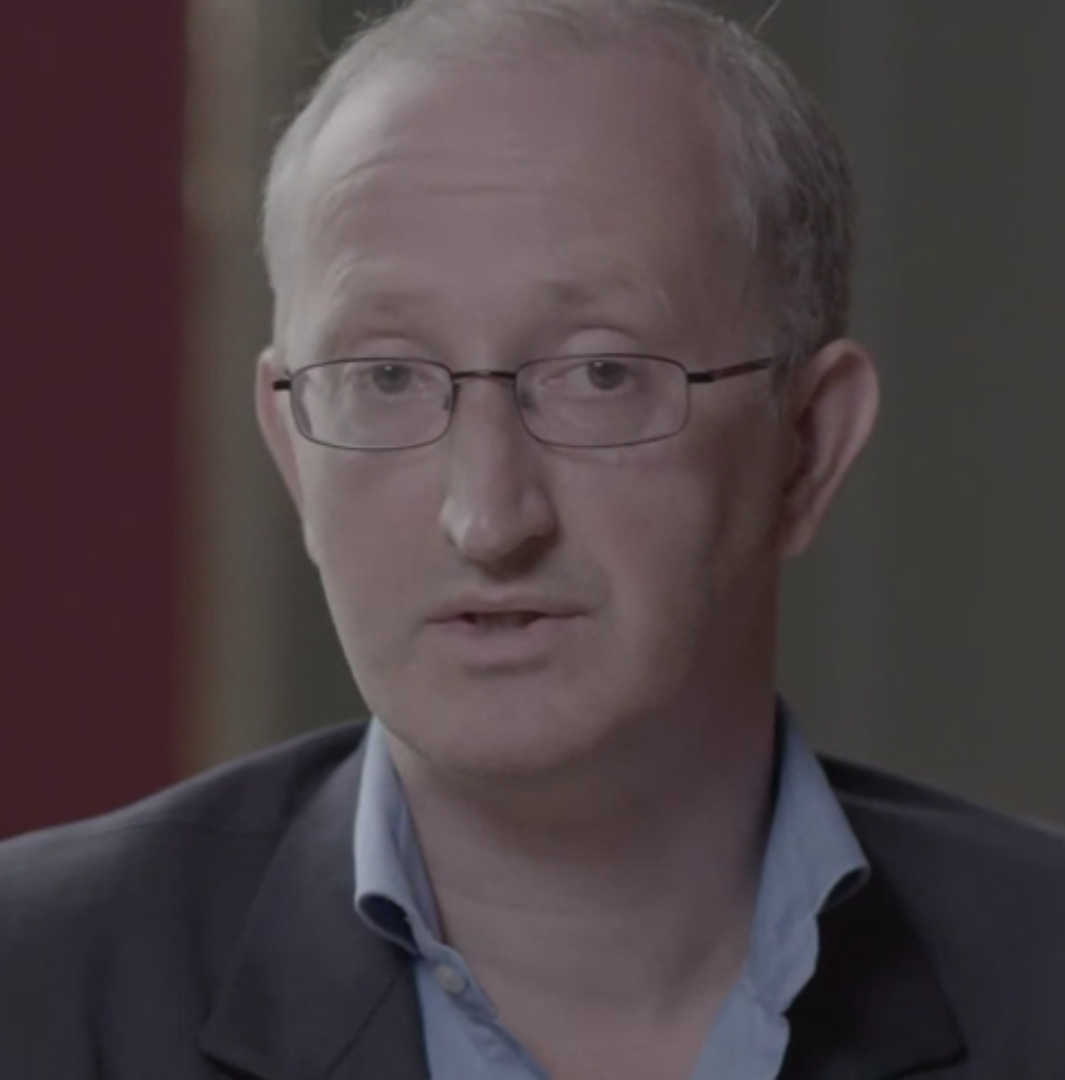
Livestro interviewed in 2016.

Joshua Livestro (born 16 December 1970, in Amersfoort) is a Dutch columnist and political writer. He was a former assistant to EU commissioner Frits Bolkestein.

Livestro studied political science at Leiden University and philosophy at the University of Cambridge. Livestro was active in the Edmund Burke Foundation, a conservative think tank. During his studies, Livestro was an active checkers player, and became national students' champion in 1994. He writes a column about foreign affairs for De Telegraaf.

Livestro succeeded Ronald Plasterk as a columnist for the Sunday morning television talkshow Buitenhof. Plasterk became an education and culture minister in the fourth Balkenende cabinet. The producers of Buitenhof fired Livestro after just four months, saying that his columns were subpar. Livestro said in a Telegraaf op-ed that he was fired for his "right-wing views," that the show routinely ignores alternate viewpoints and even censures columnists' views. He also called one of the broadcaster of Buitenhof, the NPS, a "left-wing funnel," where "a DDR mentality reigns." In wake of Livestro's firing, political parties D66 and VVD asked parliamentary questions to the culture minister, Ronald Plasterk, who incidentally was Livestro's predecessor at Buitenhof. Plasterk answered that there was enough diversity in Dutch public television.

On 25 November 2010, the Dutch daily newspaper NRC Handelsblad published an article which names Livestro an advisor to Sarah Palin; Livestro confirmed the announcement by telephone from his home in Nottingham, England.

Livestro launched Jalta.nl on 18 September 2014. He lives in Guernsey.
