= Mondriaan House =

Museum in Amersfoort, the Netherlands

Coordinates: 52°9′17.11″N 5°23′25.34″E

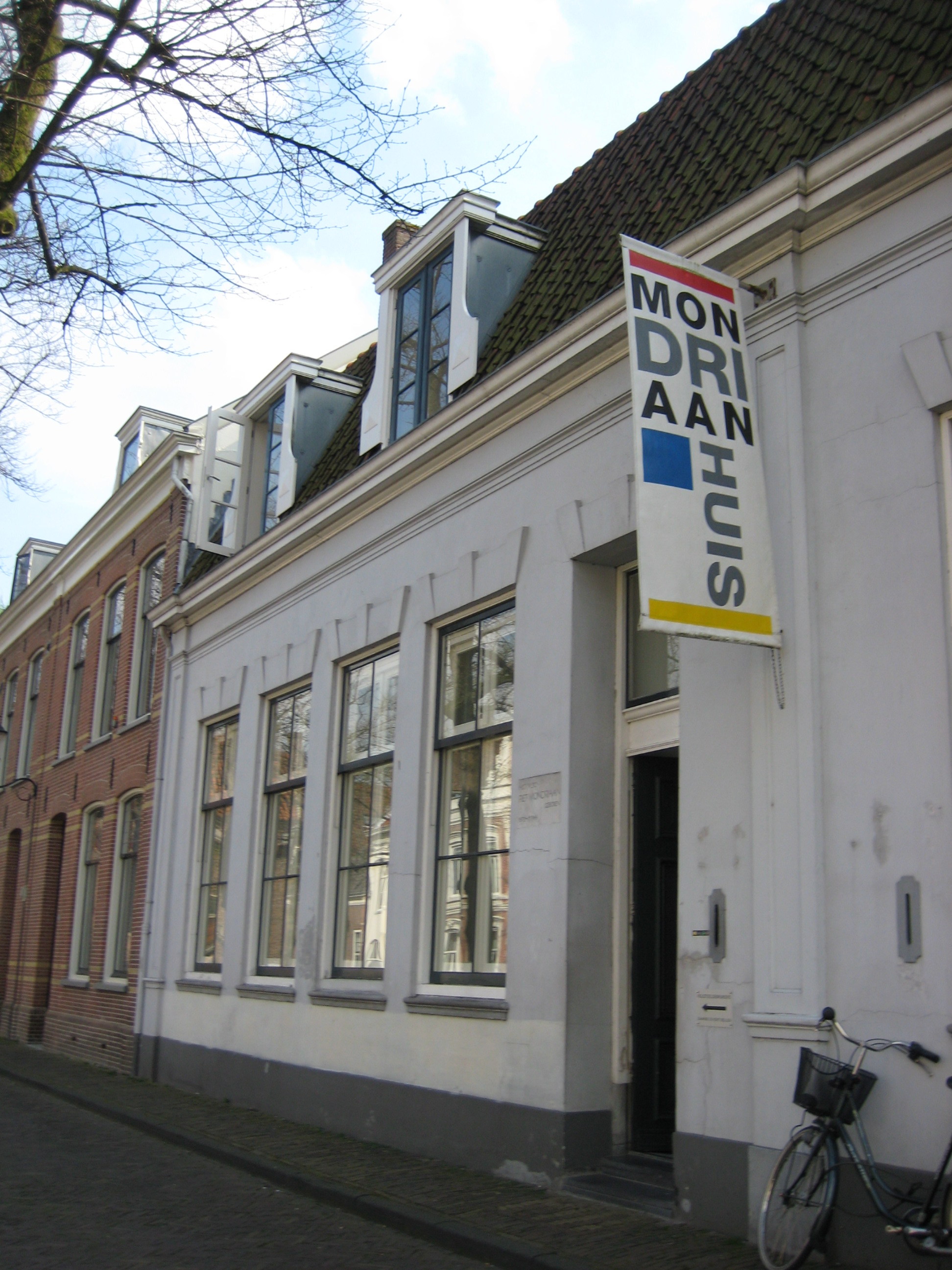
The Mondriaan House

The Mondriaan House (Dutch: Mondriaanhuis, Museum voor Constructieve en Concrete Kunst) is a museum in Amersfoort, the Netherlands, in the house where Piet Mondriaan was born in 1872. The museum building also includes the structure of the Christian primary school, where Mondrian's father served as the headmaster.

In 1994, architect Leo Heidenrijk and his wife Cis converted the location into the Mondriaan House, making it accessible to the general public. The house and the school were opened as a library and documentation centre. Since 2001 the Mondriaan House has been the only museum for constructive and concrete art in the Netherlands. After a temporary closure for substantial renovations in late 2016, the museum underwent a thorough overhaul and reopened its doors to visitors on March 7, 2017.

== The museum ==
The museum structure is situated alongside the Kortegracht, a brief stroll away from the central area of Amersfoort, and was formerly a part of the canal landscape.

The Mondriaan House has a recreation of his Paris studio of the 1920s and also a New York room. This immersive space employs projections both on the cube's surfaces and in its surroundings, presenting historical glimpses and audio snippets from 1940s New York.
