= Paul Cliteur =

Dutch politician

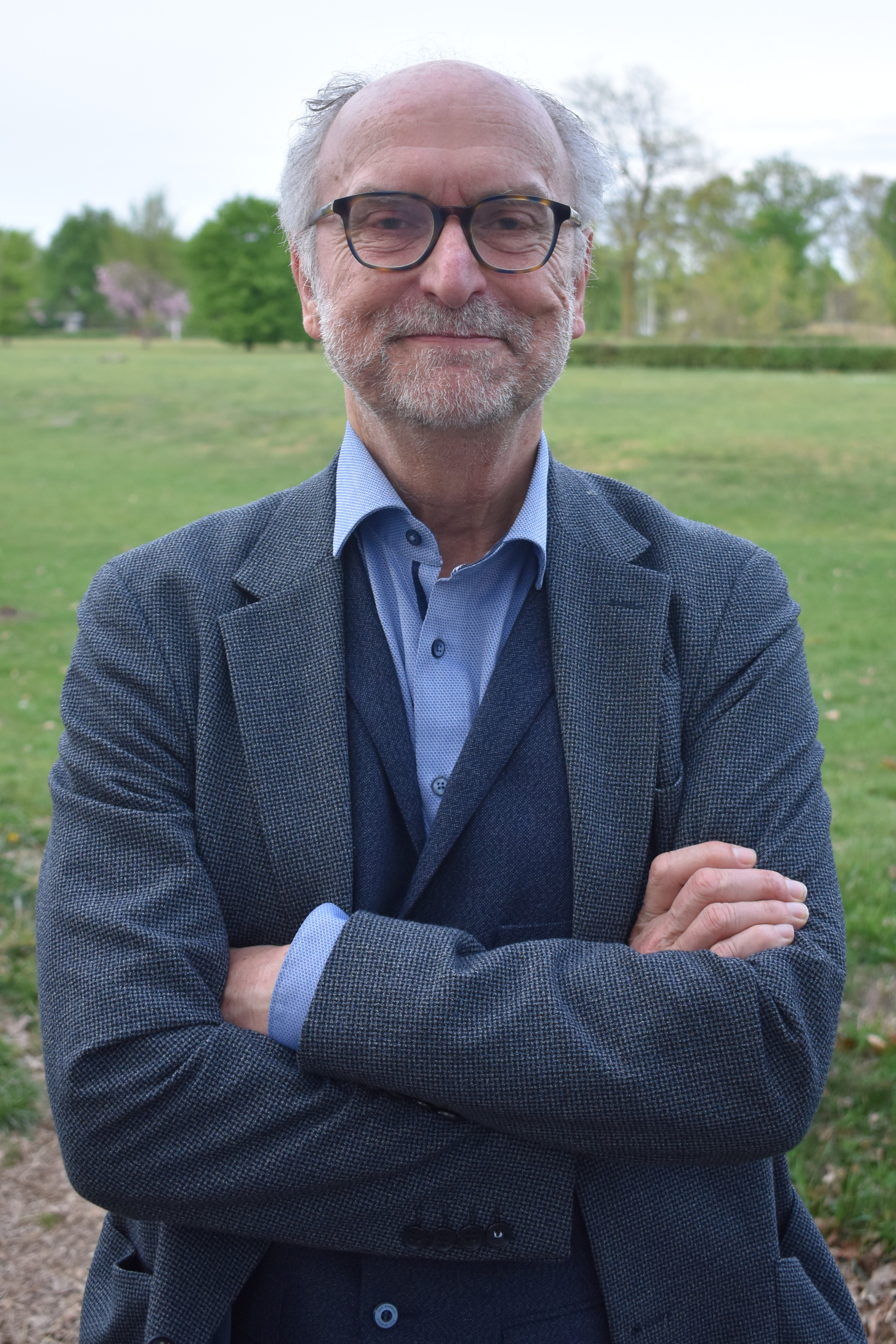
- Cliteur in 2025

Member of the Senate
- In office 11 June 2019 – 25 November 2020

Personal details
- Born: Paul Bernard Cliteur; 6 September 1955 (age 71)
- Party: Forum for Democracy (since 2015)
- Other political affiliations: Party for the Animals (until 2015)
- Title: Professor emeritus of Jurisprudence at Leiden University
- Spouse: Carla Zoethout

Academic background
- Education: Vrije Universiteit Amsterdam (MA); University of Amsterdam (LLM); Leiden University (PhD)
- Thesis: Conservatisme en Cultuurrecht. Over de fundering van recht in rechtsbeginselen (1989)
- Doctoral advisor: Herman van Gunsteren

Academic work
- Discipline: Law, philosophy
- Sub-discipline: Jurisprudence
- Institutions: Delft University of Technology; Leiden University
- Doctoral students: Thierry Baudet
- Website: Leiden University

Paul Cliteur's voice
Recorded June 2015

Paul Bernard Cliteur (born 6 September 1955) is a Dutch professor emeritus of jurisprudence at Leiden University, as well as a politician, philosopher, writer, publicist and columnist. He is known for his conservative perspective, his atheism, his republicanism, and his dislike of Islam. He is a member of De Vrije Gedachte. Since 2015, Cliteur has been a member of the Dutch political party Forum voor Democratie, where he is chairman of the advisory board and the party's official think tank. In 2019 he was elected to be parliamentary group leader for Forum voor Democratie in the Dutch Senate.

Cliteur has also been on the board of several organisations, including supervisor of the Telders Foundation (think tank of the People's Party for Freedom and Democracy), and from 1993 until 1995 chair of the Humanist League (Humanistisch Verbond).

== Lawyer and philosopher ==
Cliteur studied law and philosophy, and graduated on 22 March 1989 with his dissertation Conservatisme en cultuurrecht ("Conservatism and cultural law", published in 2005 under the title Natuurrecht, Cultuurrecht, Conservatisme, "Natural law, Cultural law, Conservatism"). From 1995 until 2002, he was Professor of Philosophy at Delft University. He is Professor of Jurisprudence at Leiden University, where he delivered his maiden speech on 28 May 2004 on "The neutral state, particular education and multiculturalism". His activities mainly include law, cultural history, philosophy and ethics.

== Columnist and publicist ==
Cliteur is mainly known for his opining works, in which he expresses his political views. He served as a columnist for, amongst others, Trouw, and had a spoken column in the TV show Buitenhof. In these, he first and foremost expresses his liberal opinions, his own vision of multiculturism, and also advocates for animal rights.

In March 2004, Cliteur told Het Parool in an interview that he felt he was being limited in freely expressing his opinions on Islam after others branded him a "racist" and "stigmatiser". This was partly due to an AIVD report, which argued criticism of Islam is counterproductive for the social integration of Muslims. Cliteur felt it necessary to moderate the tone of his spoken columns for Buitenhof. After being criticised for taking this position, he decided to terminate his contributions to Buitenhof completely, because he regarded himself to be no longer credible.

An overview of his philosophy is described in Dirk Verhofstadt in gesprek met Paul Cliteur. Een zoektocht naar harmonie (2012), an in-depth interview between Dirk Verhofstadt and Paul Cliteur on Enlightenment values such as the freedom of speech, separation of church and state, the right to self-determination and the equality of every human being.

== Political career ==
Cliteur is regarded as one of the founding fathers of the right-wing party populist party Forum for Democracy, and he was a mentor for the party's leader, Thierry Baudet, whose doctoral dissertation he directed, a dissertation seen as the ideological source for the "anti-immigration, anti-European Union party" Baudet founded later. Cliteur has been connected to the party since 2015, and in 2019 was elected to the Dutch Senate. In 2020, after the discovery of racist text messages circulating within party groups, he stood down as Senate group leader but remained a member of the FvD.

== Electoral history ==
Electoral history of Paul Cliteur
Year	Body	Party	Pos.	Votes	Result		Ref.
Year	Body	Party	Pos.	Votes	Party seats	Individual	Ref.
2004	European Parliament	Party for the Animals	12		0	Lost	
2006	House of Representatives	Party for the Animals	21/22 (Note: Cliteur was his party's 21st candidate in electoral districts 2 (Friesland) and 4 (Overijssel) and his party's 22nd candidate in all others.)	470	2	Lost	
2014	European Parliament	Party for the Animals	25		1	Lost	
2015	Provincial Council of North Holland	Party for the Animals	3		26	Lost	
2015	Senate	Party for the Animals	9		2	Lost	
2017	House of Representatives	Forum for Democracy	30	627	2	Lost	
2018	Amsterdam Municipal Council	Forum for Democracy	16	200	3	Lost	
2019	Provincial Council of North Holland	Forum for Democracy	19	1,627	9	Lost	
2019	Provincial Council of Utrecht	Forum for Democracy	13		6	Lost	
2019	Senate	Forum for Democracy	2		12	Won	
2023	House of Representatives	Forum for Democracy	49	319	3	Lost	
2024	European Parliament	Forum for Democracy	29 (Note: Cliteur participated as a lijstduwer.)	480	0	Lost	

== Works ==
Written in his capacity as a lawyer

- Humanistische filosofie ("Humanist Philosophy"), 1990
- Filosofen van het Hedendaags Liberalisme ("Philosophers of Present-Day Liberalism"), co-author, 1990
- Filosofen van het Klassieke Liberalisme ("Philosophers of Classical Liberalism"), co-author, 1993
- Rechtsfilosofische stromingen van de twintigste eeuw ("Schools of Philosophy of Law in the Twentieth Century"), 1997
- De filosofie van mensenrechten ("The Philosophy of Human Rights"), 1999
- Rechtsfilosofie, een Thematische Inleiding ("Philosophy of Law, a Thematic Introduction"), 2001
- Verscheidenheid en Verdraagzaamheid. Op de Bres voor Tolerantie ("Diversity and Tolerance. In Defence of Toleration"), 2001
- Inleiding in het Recht ("Introduction to Law"), 2001
- Natuurrecht, Cultuurrecht, Conservatisme ("Natural law, Cultural law, Conservatism"), 2005, dissertation
- The Secular Outlook: In Defense of Moral and Political Secularism, 2010. Wiley-Blackwell

Written in his capacity as Socrates Professor

- Onze verhouding tot de apen; de consequenties van het Darwinisme voor ons mensbeeld en voor de moraal ("Our Relation to the Apes"; the Consequences of Darwinism for Our View of Humanity and Morality), maiden speech, 1995

Written in his capacity as a publicist

- Darwin, dier en recht ("Darwin, Animals and Rights"), 2001
- Moderne Papoea's ("Modern Papuas"), 2002
- Tegen de Decadentie ("Against Decadence"), 2003
- God houdt niet van vrijzinnigheid ("God Does Not Like Liberalism"), Bert Bakker (Amsterdam, 2004), ISBN 9035126297
- Moreel Esperanto ("Moral Esperanto"), 2007 (nl)
- Het Monotheïstisch dilemma ("The Monotheist Dilemma"), 2010, Uitg. De Arbeiderspers
- Dirk Verhofstadt in gesprek met Paul Cliteur. Een zoektocht naar harmonie ("Dirk Verhofstadt in Conversation with Paul Cliteur. A Quest for Harmony"), 2012, Houtekiet
- De succesvolle mislukking van Europa ("The Successful Failure of Europe"), as co-editor with Frits Bolkestein and Meindert Fennema, 2015, Houtekiet
- Het Atheïstisch Woordenboek ("The Atheist Dictionary") with Dirk Verhofstadt as co-author, 2015, Houtekiet

Lecture on audio cd

- Humanisme. Een hoorcollege over vrijdenken, atheïsme, politiek en moraal ("Humanism. A Lecture on Freethought, Atheism, Politics and Morality"), Home Academy Publishers (The Hague, 2006)
