= Provincial Council of North Holland =

Provincial council in North Holland, Netherlands

Type
- Type: Provincial council

Leadership
- President: Arthur van Dijk (VVD)
- Secretary: Katja Bolt
- Seats: 55

Elections
- Last election: 15 March 2023

Meeting place
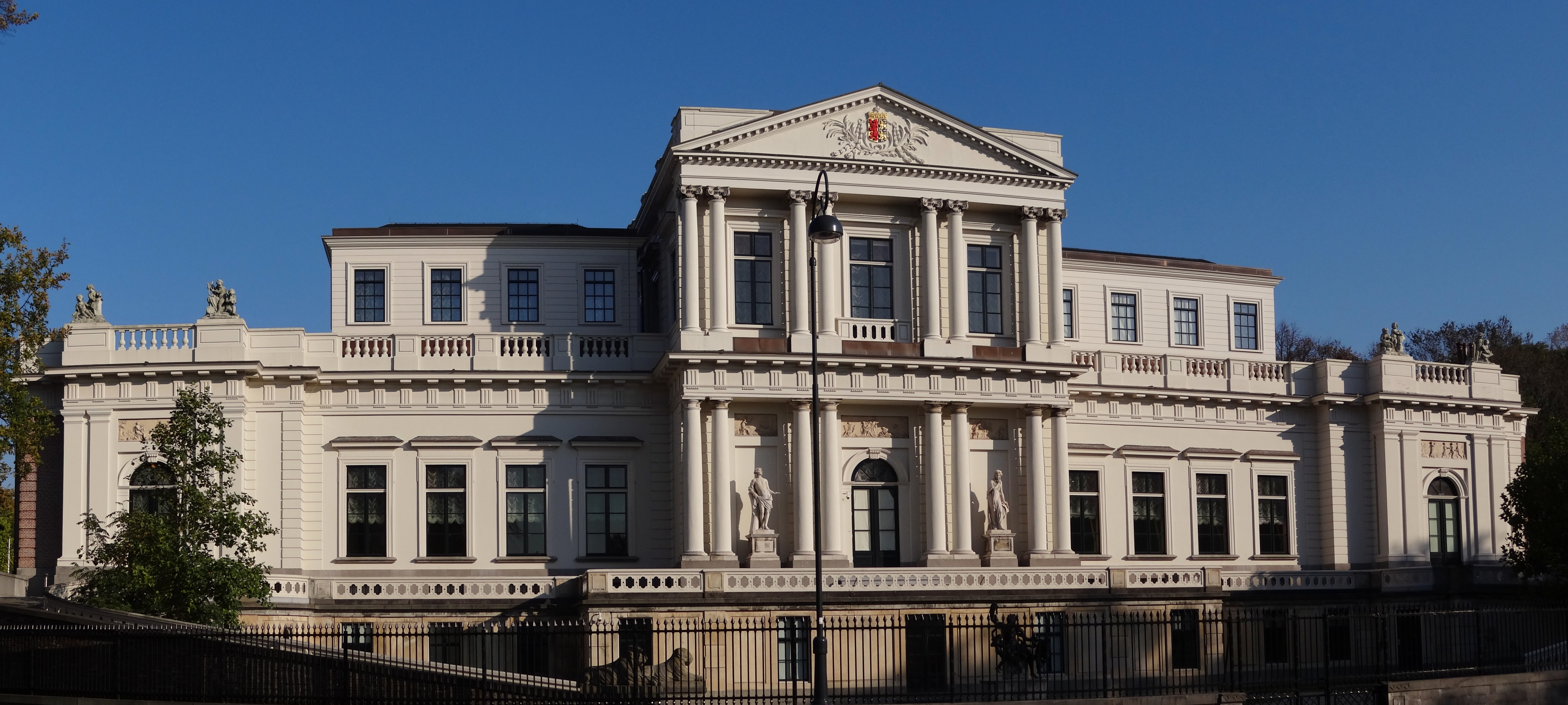
- Meeting place of the Provincial Council of North Holland in Haarlem

Website
- www.noord-holland.nl/Bestuur/Provinciale_Staten

The Provincial Council of North Holland (Dutch: Provinciale Staten van Noord-Holland, pronounced [proːvɪɲˈɕaːlə ˈstaːtə(ɱ) vɑ noːrtˈɦɔlɑnt]), also known as the States of North Holland, is the provincial council of North Holland, Netherlands. It forms the legislative body of the province. Its 55 seats are distributed every four years in provincial elections.

== Current composition ==
Since the 2023 provincial elections, the distribution of seats of the Provincial Council of North Holland has been as follows:

Party	Votes	%	+/–	Seats	+/–
Farmer–Citizen Movement	161,876	13.64	New	8	New
People's Party for Freedom and Democracy	151,454	12.76	–1.76	8	–1
GroenLinks	135,205	11.40	–3.86	7	–2
Labour Party	131,566	11.09	+1.31	7	+1
Democrats 66	87,910	7.41	–2.53	4	–2
Party for the Animals	86,857	7.32	+1.25	4	+1
JA21	64,606	5.45	New	3	New
Party for Freedom	55,890	4.71	–0.89	3	0
Volt	53,448	4.50	New	2	New
Christian Democratic Appeal	47,429	4.00	–2.81	2	–2
Forum for Democracy	41,685	3.51	–11.82	2	–7
Socialist Party	40,104	3.38	–1.73	2	–1
50PLUS	36,234	3.05	+0.29	2	+1
Christian Union	24,753	2.09	–1.04	1	0
DENK	14,711	1.24	–1.16	0	–1
BVNL	13,603	1.15	New	0	New
Independent Politics-NH	11,916	1.00	New	0	New
General Water Board Party	8,931	0.75	New	0	New
Pirate Party	6,406	0.54	New	0	New
Code Orange	4,915	0.41	–1.02	0	0
Netherlands with a PLAN	3,518	0.30	New	0	New
On behalf of North-Hollanders	2,337	0.20	New	0	New
Jesus Lives	1,158	0.10	New	0	New
Total	1,186,512	100.00	–	55	–
Valid votes	1,186,512	99.32			
Invalid votes	3,684	0.31			
Blank votes	4,448	0.37			
Total votes	1,194,644	100.00			
Registered voters/turnout	2,102,298	56.83	+0.49		
Source: Kiesraad

== See also ==
- States of Holland and West Friesland
- Provincial politics in the Netherlands
