= Provincial Council of Utrecht =

Provincial council in Utrecht, Netherlands

Provincial Council of Utrecht Provinciale Staten van Utrecht

Type
- Type: Unicameral

Leadership
- President: Hans Oosters (PvdA)
- Seats: 47

Meeting place
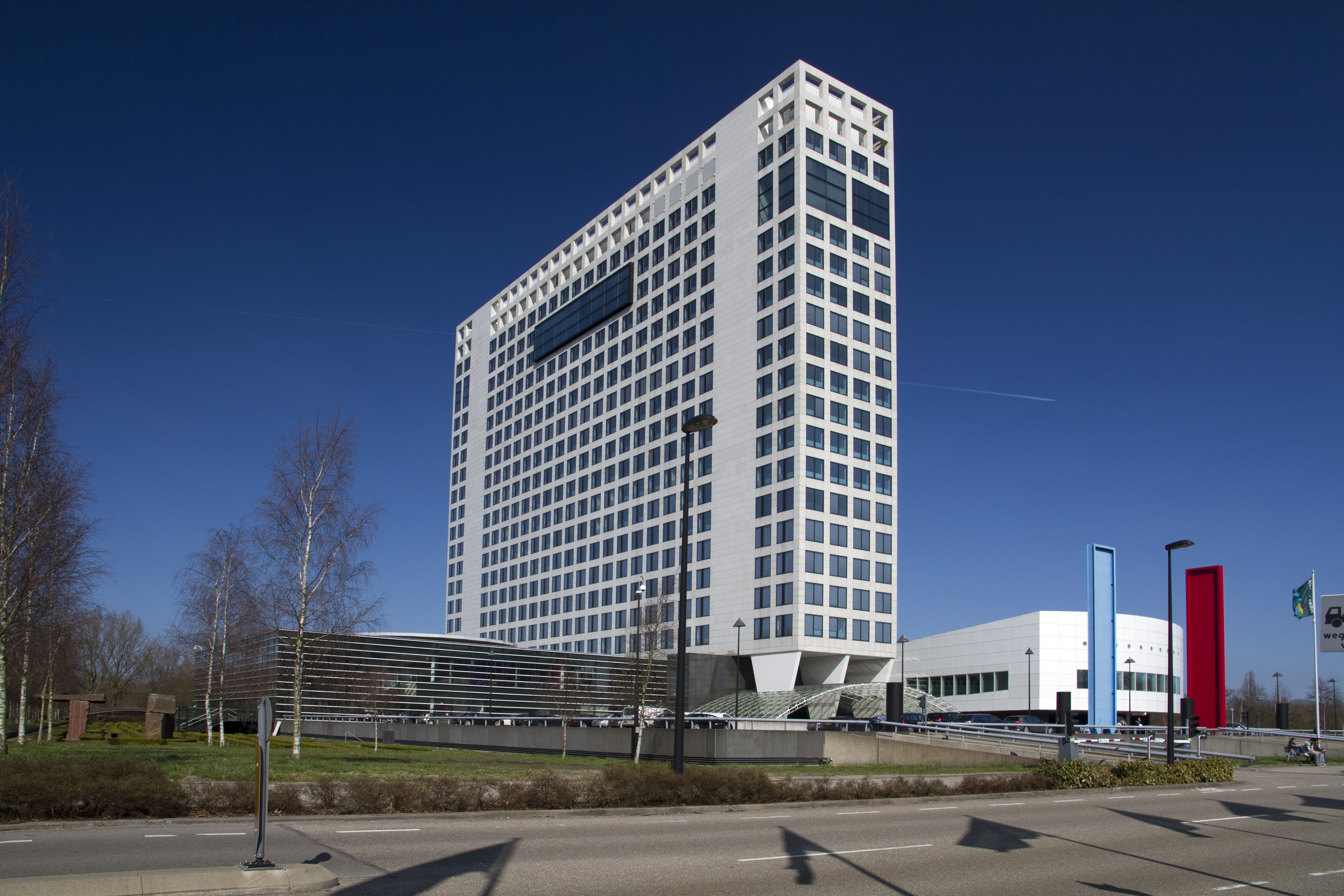
- Meeting place of the Provincial Council of Utrecht in Utrecht

The Provincial Council of Utrecht (Dutch: Staten van Utrecht, pronounced [ˈstaːtə(ɱ) vɑn ˈytrɛxt]) is the provincial council for the Dutch province of Utrecht. It forms the unicameral legislature of the province. Its 47 seats are elected every four years in provincial elections.

== Current composition ==
Since the 2023 provincial elections, the distribution of seats of the Provincial Council of Utrecht has been as follows:

Party	Votes	%	+/–	Seats	+/–
Farmer–Citizen Movement	85,890	13.16	New	7	New
GroenLinks	83,904	12.86	–3.21	7	–1
People's Party for Freedom and Democracy	77,461	11.87	–4.44	6	–2
Democrats 66	60,835	9.32	–0.13	5	0
Christian Democratic Appeal	52,223	8.00	–1.88	4	–1
Labour Party	44,295	6.79	–0.51	3	–1
Party for the Animals	36,883	5.65	+0.94	3	+1
Christian Union	35,987	5.52	–1.77	3	–1
Volt	30,032	4.60	New	2	New
JA21	28,180	4.32	New	2	New
Party for Freedom	26,667	4.09	–0.83	2	0
Reformed Political Party	24,724	3.79	+0.25	2	+1
Socialist Party	16,880	2.59	–1.29	1	–1
Forum for Democracy	13,498	2.07	–9.53	1	–5
50PLUS	11,625	1.78	–1.10	1	0
DENK	10,356	1.59	–0.54	0	–1
U26 Municipalities	7,646	1.17	+0.11	0	0
BVNL	4,666	0.72	New	0	New
BLACK PETE IS BLACK	742	0.11	New	0	New
Total	652,494	100.00	–	49	–
Valid votes	652,494	99.49			
Invalid votes	1,425	0.22			
Blank votes	1,894	0.29			
Total votes	655,813	100.00			
Registered voters/turnout	1,033,686	63.44	+1.87		
Source: Kiesraad

== See also ==
- Provincial politics in the Netherlands
