= List of members of the Senate of the Netherlands, 2015–2019 =

Senate, 2015–2019
←	2011–2015	2019–2023	→
- Composition of the Senate

Overview
- Legislative body: Senate
- Meeting place: Binnenhof
- Term: 9 June 2015 – 10 June 2019
- Election: 2015
- Members: 75
- President of the Senate: Ankie Broekers-Knol

Between 9 June 2015 and 10 June 2019, 98 individuals served as representatives in the Senate, the 75-seat upper house of the States-General of the Netherlands. 75 representatives were elected in the 26 May 2015 Senate election and installed at the start of the term; 23 representatives were appointed as replacements when elected representatives resigned or went on leave.

During this period, the second and third Rutte cabinets reigned. The former coalition consisted of the People's Party for Freedom and Democracy (VVD, 13 seats) and the Labour Party (PvdA, 8 seats). The opposition was composed of the Christian Democratic Appeal (CDA, 12 seats), Democrats 66 (D66, 10 seats), Party for Freedom (PVV, 9 seats), Socialist Party (SP, 9 seats), GroenLinks (GL, 4 seats), Christian Union (CU, 3 seats), Party for the Animals (PvdD, 2 seats), Reformed Political Party (SGP, 2 seats), 50PLUS (50+, 2 seats), and Independent Senate Group (OSF, 1 seat).

== Members ==
All members are sworn in at the start of the term, even if they are not new. Assumed office in this list therefore refers to the swearing in during this term (or return date of members who left), while all members are automatically considered to have left office at the end of the term.

Members of the Senate of the Netherlands, 2015–2019
Name	Parliamentary group	Assumed office	Left office	Ref.
Max Aardema	PVV	31 October 2017 (Note: Replaced Martin van Beek during his sick leave)	13 February 2018	
Max Aardema	PVV	20 March 2018	3 July 2018	
Max Aardema	PVV	16 October 2018	10 June 2019	
Margo Andriessen	D66	25 September 2018	10 June 2019	
Bastiaan van Apeldoorn	SP	9 June 2015	10 June 2019	
Joop Atsma	CDA	9 June 2015	10 June 2019	
Martine Baay-Timmerman	50+	28 March 2017	10 June 2019	
Joris Backer	D66	9 June 2015	10 June 2019	
Marleen Barth	PvdA	9 June 2015	8 February 2018 (Note: Left because of a scandal)	
Martin van Beek	PVV	28 March 2017	24 October 2017 (Note: Went on sick leave)	
Martin van Beek	PVV	14 February 2018	13 March 2018	
Martin van Beek	PVV	4 July 2018	26 August 2018 (Note: Died in office)	
Jannette Beuving	PvdA	9 June 2015	27 March 2018 (Note: Left to be a judge at the Arnhem-Leeuwarden Court of Appeal)	
Sophie van Bijsterveld	CDA	9 June 2015	10 June 2019	
Mirjam Bikker	CU	9 June 2015	31 August 2016 (Note: Went on parental leave)	
Mirjam Bikker	CU	22 December 2016	10 June 2019	
Harmen Binnema	GL	2 October 2018	10 June 2019	
Annelien Bredenoord	D66	9 June 2015	2 October 2018	
Annelien Bredenoord	D66	24 January 2019	10 June 2019	
Elco Brinkman	CDA	9 June 2015	10 June 2019	
Ankie Broekers-Knol	VVD	9 June 2015	10 June 2019	
Jan Anthonie Bruijn	VVD	9 June 2015	10 June 2019	
Reina de Bruijn-Wezeman	VVD	21 March 2017	10 June 2019	
René Dercksen	PVV	9 June 2015	10 June 2019	
Diederik van Dijk	SGP	9 June 2015	10 June 2019	
Peter van Dijk	PVV	8 September 2015 (Note: Replaced Gabriëlle Popken during her parental leave)	28 December 2015	
Peter van Dijk	PVV	28 March 2017	10 June 2019	
Hans-Martin Don	SP	9 June 2015	10 June 2019	
Anne-Wil Duthler	VVD (Note: Until 26 April 2019)	9 June 2015	10 June 2019	
Anne-Wil Duthler	Duthler (Note: Starting 26 April 2019)	9 June 2015	10 June 2019	
Tuur Elzinga	SP	9 June 2015	30 September 2016 (Note: Left to work for the Federation of Dutch Trade Unions)	
Hans Engels	D66	9 June 2015	10 June 2019	
Peter Ester	CU	9 June 2015	10 June 2019	
Marjolein Faber	PVV	9 June 2015	10 June 2019	
Mary Fiers	PvdA	3 April 2018	10 June 2019	
Anne Flierman	CDA	9 June 2015	10 June 2019	
Ruard Ganzevoort	GL	9 June 2015	10 June 2019	
Arda Gerkens	SP	9 June 2015	10 June 2019	
Marion Gout-van Sinderen	D66	9 June 2015	10 June 2019	
Thom de Graaf	D66	9 June 2015	19 September 2018 (Note: Left to become vice-president of the Council of State)	
Frank de Grave	VVD	9 June 2015	2 September 2018 (Note: Left to become state councillor for the Council of State's advisory division)	
Alexander van Hattem	PVV	9 June 2015	10 June 2019	
Loek Hermans	VVD	9 June 2015	3 November 2015	
Wopke Hoekstra	CDA	9 June 2015	24 October 2017 (Note: Left to join the third Rutte cabinet)	
Henk ten Hoeve	OSF	9 June 2015	10 June 2019	
Helmi Huijbregts-Schiedon	VVD	9 June 2015	10 June 2019	
Annemarie Jorritsma	VVD	9 June 2015	10 June 2019	
Frank van Kappen	VVD	9 June 2015	10 June 2019	
Niek Jan van Kesteren	CDA	9 June 2015	10 June 2019	
Ton van Kesteren	PVV	28 March 2017	10 June 2019	
Tanja Klip-Martin	VVD	12 July 2016	10 June 2019	
Ben Knapen	CDA	9 June 2015	10 June 2019	
Menno Knip	VVD	9 June 2015	10 June 2019	
Niko Koffeman	PvdD	9 June 2015	10 June 2019	
Frank Köhler	SP	9 June 2015	10 June 2019	
Kees Kok	PVV	9 June 2015	10 June 2019	
Alexander Kops	PVV	9 June 2015	21 March 2017 (Note: Left to join the House of Representatives)	
Tiny Kox	SP	9 June 2015	10 June 2019	
Pauline Krikke	VVD	9 June 2015	15 March 2017 (Note: Left to become mayor of The Hague)	
Roel Kuiper	CU	9 June 2015	10 June 2019	
Floriske van Leeuwen	PvdD	16 October 2018	11 March 2019 (Note: Left to allow for the return of Christine Teunissen)	
Frits Lintmeijer	GL	9 June 2015	10 June 2019	
Pia Lokin-Sassen	CDA	31 October 2017	10 June 2019	
Gidi Markuszower	PVV	9 June 2015	21 March 2017	
Maria Martens	CDA	9 June 2015	10 June 2019	
Meta Meijer	SP	9 June 2015	10 June 2019	
Jan Nagel	50+	9 June 2015	10 June 2019	
Jopie Nooren	PvdA	9 June 2015	10 June 2019	
Ria Oomen-Ruijten	CDA	9 June 2015	10 June 2019	
Henk Overbeek	SP	4 October 2016	10 June 2019	
Henk Pijlman	D66	9 June 2015	10 June 2019	
Gabriëlle Popken	PVV	9 June 2015	7 September 2015	
Gabriëlle Popken	PVV	29 December 2015	20 March 2017	
André Postema	PvdA	9 June 2015	10 June 2019	
Henriëtte Prast	D66	9 June 2015	28 February 2019 (Note: Left for political reasons)	
Geert Reuten	SP	26 June 2018	10 June 2019	
Marnix van Rij	CDA	9 June 2015	10 June 2019	
Alexander Rinnooy Kan	D66	9 June 2015	10 June 2019	
Ton Rombouts	CDA	9 June 2015	10 June 2019	
Martin van Rooijen	50+	9 June 2015	21 March 2017	
Bob Ruers	SP	9 June 2015	19 June 2018 (Note: Left to join the Provincial Executive of Limburg)	
Bob Ruers	SP	5 February 2019	10 June 2019	
Sybe Schaap	VVD	9 June 2015	10 June 2019	
Peter Schalk	SGP	9 June 2015	10 June 2019	
Herman Schaper	D66	9 June 2015	15 February 2019 (Note: Left for personal reasons)	
Paul Schnabel	D66	9 June 2015	10 June 2019	
Koos Schouwenaar	VVD	9 June 2015	10 June 2019	
Nico Schrijver	PvdA	9 June 2015	31 August 2017	
Esther-Mirjam Sent	PvdA	9 June 2015	10 June 2019	
Herman Sietsma	CU	13 September 2016 (Note: Replaced Mirjam Bikker during her parental leave)	21 December 2016	
Mohamed Sini	PvdA	6 December 2016	10 June 2019	
Dannij van der Sluijs	PVV	28 March 2017	10 June 2019	
Petra Stienen	D66	9 June 2015	10 June 2019	
Gom van Strien	PVV	9 June 2015	10 June 2019	
Tineke Strik	GL	9 June 2015	10 June 2019	
Ben Swagerman	VVD	10 November 2015	10 July 2016 (Note: Left to work for Qatar Airways)	
Christine Teunissen	PvdD	9 June 2015	9 October 2018	
Christine Teunissen	PvdD	12 March 2019	10 June 2019	
Mart van de Ven	VVD	9 June 2015	10 June 2019	
Lambert Verheijen	PvdA	9 June 2015	10 June 2019	
Anita Vink	D66	9 October 2018 (Note: Replaced Annelien Bredenoord during her parental leave)	23 January 2019	
Anita Vink	D66	29 January 2019	10 June 2019	
Janny Vlietstra	PvdA	12 September 2017	10 June 2019	
Marijke Vos	GL	9 June 2015	25 September 2018	
Ruud Vreeman	PvdA	9 June 2015	30 November 2016 (Note: Left to become acting mayor of Zaanstad)	
Greetje de Vries-Leggedoor	CDA	9 June 2015	10 June 2019	
Danai van Weerdenburg	PVV	9 June 2015	21 March 2017	
Roel Wever	VVD	11 September 2018	10 June 2019	
Anneke Wezel	SP	9 June 2015	31 January 2019 (Note: Left to work for the Tax and Customs Administration)	
Wouter van Zandbrink	PvdA	13 February 2018	10 June 2019	

== See also ==
- List of candidates in the 2015 Dutch Senate election
