= List of members of the Senate of the Netherlands for the Party for Freedom =

This is a list of all (former) members of the Senate of the Netherlands for Party for Freedom (PVV).

== List ==
Member	Start Date	End Date	Ref.
Max Aardema	31 October 2017	14 February 2018	
Max Aardema	14 March 2018	4 July 2018	
Max Aardema	16 October 2018	11 June 2019	
Martin van Beek	2 October 2012	9 June 2015	
Martin van Beek	28 March 2017	24 October 2017	
Martin van Beek	15 February 2018	13 March 2018	
Martin van Beek	5 July 2018	26 August 2018	
Ilse Bezaan	11 June 2019		
René Dercksen	9 June 2015	11 June 2019	
Peter van Dijk	7 June 2011	9 June 2015	
Peter van Dijk	8 September 2015	28 December 2015	
Peter van Dijk	28 March 2017	11 June 2019	
Marjolein Faber	7 June 2011	5 December 2023	
Mariëtte Frijters-Klijnen	7 June 2011	9 June 2015	
Machiel de Graaf	7 June 2011	19 September 2012	
Marcel de Graaff	7 June 2011	1 July 2014	
Alexander van Hattem	9 June 2015		
Ton van Kesteren	28 March 2017	12 June 2023	
Ton van Kesteren	12 December 2023		
Reinette Klever	7 June 2011	19 September 2012	
Kees Kok	2 October 2012	11 June 2019	
Alexander Kops	8 July 2014	21 March 2017	
Gidi Markuszower	9 June 2015	21 March 2017	
Gabriëlle Popken	7 June 2011	7 September 2015	
Gabriëlle Popken	29 December 2015	21 March 2017	
Tobias Reynaers	7 June 2011	9 June 2015	
Dannij van der Sluijs	28 March 2017	11 June 2019	
Ronald Sørensen	7 June 2011	9 June 2015	
Gom van Strien	7 June 2011		
Danai van Weerdenburg	9 June 2015	21 March 2017	

== See also ==
- List of Party for Freedom candidates in the 2011 Dutch Senate election
- List of Party for Freedom candidates in the 2015 Dutch Senate election
- List of Party for Freedom candidates in the 2019 Dutch Senate election
- List of Party for Freedom candidates in the 2023 Dutch Senate election
