= List of candidates in the 2015 Dutch Senate election =

For the 2015 Dutch Senate election, 12 electoral lists were successfully submitted, totalling 261 candidates.

The 75 seats were awarded to party lists, with candidates over the preference threshold awarded a seat first if available and the other seats awarded based on position on the list. The preference threshold for this election was 2,255 weighted votes (same as the electoral threshold). Two candidate would have not been elected based on position on the list, but received enough preference votes: Alexander Kops and Alexander van Hattem (both Party for Freedom). Replacements are also asked based on position on the list.

== 1: People's Party for Freedom and Democracy ==
Candidate list for People's Party for Freedom and Democracy
Position	Candidate	Votes	Weighted votes	Result
1	Loek Hermans			Elected
2	Ankie Broekers-Knol			Elected
3	Annemarie Jorritsma-Lebbink			Elected
4	Frank van Kappen			Elected
5	Frank de Grave			Elected
6	Helmi Huijbregts-Schiedon			Elected
7	Jan Anthonie Bruijn			Elected
8	Koos Schouwenaar			Elected
9	Mart van de Ven			Elected
10	Pauline Krikke			Elected
11	Anne-Wil Duthler			Elected
12	Sybe Schaap			Elected
13	Menno Knip			Elected
14	Ben Swagerman			Replacement
15	Tanja Klip-Martin			Replacement
16	Reina de Bruijn-Wezeman			Replacement
17	Roel Wever			Replacement
18	Dick Sluimers			
19	Albert van den Bosch			
20	Erik van der Maas			
21	Avine Fokkens-Kelder			
22	Henk Jan Meijer			
23	Han ter Heegde			
24	Paul Zevenbergen			
25	Alfred Arbouw			
26	Marc Muntinga			
27	Ton van Ede			
28	Ida van Veldhuizen			
29	Frits Barneveld Binkhuysen			
30	Tjalling Tiemstra			
31	Kees Bierens			
32	René Meeuwissen			
33	Willem Cramer			
34	Rian Vogels			
35	Sven Tulner			
36	Kees Noomen			
37	Marlies Pernot			
38	Huub Hieltjes			
39	Pauline Bouvy-Koene			
40	Bastiaan Meerburg			
41	Robert Gebel			
42	Arnoud Passenier			
43	Pieter van Woensel			
44	Joël Scherrenberg			
45	Han Moraal			
46	Pim van Ballekom			
Total				

== 2: Labour Party ==
Candidate list for Labour Party
Position	Candidate	Votes	Weighted votes	Result
1	Marleen Barth			Elected
2	Ruud Vreeman			Elected
3	Jannette Beuving			Elected
4	Nico Schrijver			Elected
5	Jopie Nooren			Elected
6	André Postema			Elected
7	Lambert Verheijen			Elected
8	Esther Mirjam Sent			Elected
9	Mohamed Sini			Replacement
10	Janny Vlietstra			Replacement
11	Wouter van Zandbrink			Replacement
12	Flora Goudappel			
13	Mary Fiers			
14	Anne Koning			
15	Pieter Tops			
16	Attiya Gamri			
17	Co Verdaas			
18	Usman Santi			
19	Jan Westhoff			
20	Jaouad Khamkhami			
21	Wilma Brouwer			
22	Jan Schuurman Hess			
23	Nicole Teeuwen			
24	Saskia Noorman-den Uyl			
Total				

== 3: Christian Democratic Appeal ==
Candidate list for Christian Democratic Appeal
Position	Candidate	Votes	Weighted votes	Result
1	Elco Brinkman			Elected
2	Maria Martens			Elected
3	Wopke Hoekstra			Elected
4	Ton Rombouts			Elected
5	Grietje de Vries-Leggedoor			Elected
6	Niek Jan van Kesteren			Elected
7	Anne Flierman			Elected
8	Ben Knapen			Elected
9	Ria Oomen-Ruijten			Elected
10	Joop Atsma			Elected
11	Marnix van Rij			Elected
12	Sophie van Bijsterveld			Elected
13	Pia Lokin-Sassen			Replacement
14	Siem Korver			
15	Dick van Hemmen			
16	Frank Kerckhaert			
17	Gertjan van der Brugge			
18	Jan de Vries			
19	Anita Sörensen			
20	Brigitte Bauer			
21	Geart Benedictus			
22	Marius Buiting			
23	Hans van Kranenburg			
24	Paul van Geest			
25	Marianne Luyer			
26	Raymond Gradus			
27	Bas Jan van Bochove			
28	Frank van den Heuvel			
29	Jan Leliveld			
30	Yolande Ulenaers			
31	Pieter van Maaren			
32	Lida Schelwald-van der Kleij			
33	Harry Bodifée			
34	Wim van Fessem			
35	Antoinette Vietsch			
36	Marlies Veldhuijzen van Zanten			
Total				

== 4: Party for Freedom ==
Candidate list for the Party for Freedom
Number	Candidate	Votes	Weighted votes	Result
1	Marjolein Faber	11	2,083	Elected
2	Gom van Strien	5	1,190	Elected
3	René Dercksen	2	516	Elected
4	Gabriëlle Popken	1	238	Elected
5	Gidi Markuszower	1	502	Elected
6	Danai van Weerdenburg	1	502	Elected
7	Kees Kok	11	3,710	Elected
8	Peter van Dijk	0	0	Replacement
9	Alexander van Hattem	7	3,171	Elected
10	Martin van Beek	0	0	Replacement
11	Dannij van der Sluijs	3	1,506	Replacement
12	Ton van Kesteren	8	1,003	Replacement
13	Max Aardema	4	600	Replacement
14	Alexander Kops	12	5,214	Elected
15	Auke Zijlstra	0	0	
16	Tim Vermeer	0	0	
17	Floris van Zonneveld	0	0	
18	Elias van Hees	0	0	
Total		66	20,235	

== 5: Socialist Party ==
Candidate list for Socialist Party
Position	Candidate	Votes	Weighted votes	Result
1	Tiny Kox	70	20,038	Elected
2	Arda Gerkens	0	0	Elected
3	Hans Martin Don	0	0	Elected
4	Anneke Wezel	0	0	Elected
5	Bastiaan van Apeldoorn	0	0	Elected
6	Tuur Elzinga	0	0	Elected
7	Meta Meijer	0	0	Elected
8	Bob Ruers	0	0	Elected
9	Frank Köhler	0	0	Elected
10	Geert Reuten	0	0	Replacement
11	Henk Overbeek	0	0	Replacement
12	Sineke ten Horn	0	0	
13	Erik Meijer	0	0	
14	Riet de Wit-Romans	0	0	
15	Jules Iding	0	0	
16	Ineke Palm	0	0	
17	Tineke Slagter-Roukema	0	0	
18	Moska Ghazizoi	0	0	
19	Riet Nigten	0	0	
20	Kevin Levie	0	0	
21	Ane Duijff	0	0	
22	Inez Staarink	0	0	
23	Bernard Gerard	0	0	
24	Edith Plantier	0	0	
25	Trix de Roos-Consemulder	0	0	
26	Pieter Kraaima	0	0	
27	Jean Rouwet	0	0	
28	Remi Poppe	0	0	
Total				

== 6: Democrats 66 ==
Candidate list for Democrats 66
Position	Candidate	Votes	Weighted votes	Result
1	Thom de Graaf			Elected
2	Alexander Rinnooy Kan			Elected
3	Henriette Prast			Elected
4	Hans Engels			Elected
5	Annelien Bredenoord			Elected
6	Joris Backer			Elected
7	Paul Schnabel			Elected
8	Petra Stienen			Elected
9	Henk Pijlman			Elected
10	Herman Schaper			Elected
11	Margo Andriessen			Replacement
12	Fleur Spijker			
13	Anita Vink			Replacement
14	Paul Comenencia			
15	Marion Gout-van Sinderen			
16	Adriana Esmeijer			
17	Bas Werker			
18	Hans Glaubitz			
19	Johanna Boogerd-Quaak			
20	Elisabeth van Oostrum			
21	Patrick Poelmann			
22	Anneke Wijbenga			
23	Jacqueline Versteeg			
24	Mark Sanders			
25	Bob van den Bos			
Total				

== 7: GroenLinks ==
Candidate list for GroenLinks
Position	Candidate	Votes	Weighted votes	Result
1	Tineke Strik			Elected
2	Ruard Ganzevoort			Elected
3	Marijke Vos			Elected
4	Frits Lintmeijer			Elected
5	Harmen Binnema			Replacement
6	Margreet de Boer			
7	Axel Boomgaars			
8	Barbara Wegelin			
9	Marcel Vissers			
10	Saskia Bolten			
11	Herma Hofmeijer			
12	Jan Dirx			
13	Willem Verf			
14	Nevin Özütok			
15	Pauline Goedvolk			
16	Gert Jan Kleinpaste			
17	Rik Grashoff			
18	Wijnand Duijvendak			
Total				

== 8: ChristianUnion ==
Candidate list for ChristianUnion
Position	Candidate	Votes	Weighted votes	Result
1	Roel Kuiper			Elected
2	Peter Ester			Elected
3	Mirjam Bikker			Elected
4	Herman Sietsma			Replacement
5	Beatrice de Graaf			
6	Martijn van Meppelen Scheppink			
7	Hendrik-Jan Talsma			
8	Gerdien Rots			
9	Kees van Kranenburg			
10	Jacqueline Koops-Scheele			
Total				

== 9: Reformed Political Party ==
Candidate list for Reformed Political Party
Position	Candidate	Votes	Weighted votes	Result
1	Peter Schalk			Elected
2	Diederik van Dijk			Elected
3	Servaas Stoop			
4	Hans Tanis			
5	George van Heukelom			
6	Breunis van de Weerd			
7	Gert-Jan Kats			
8	Rien Bogerd			
9	Dirk van Dijk			
10	Arnold Weggeman			
11	Rien Hoek			
12	Theo Meijboom			
13	David van As			
14	Wim de Vries			
15	Jos Bart			
16	Arjo van Bezooijen			
17	Peter Zevenbergen			
18	Aart de Kruijf			
19	Ad Dorst			
20	Wouter Boonzaaijer			
Total				

== 10: 50Plus ==
Candidate list for 50Plus
Position	Candidate	Votes	Weighted votes	Result
1	Jan Nagel			Elected
2	Martin van Rooijen			Elected
3	Martine Baay			Replacement
4	John Struijlaard			
5	Maurice Koopman			
6	Monique van de Griendt			
7	Jan Waterlander			
8	Richard De Mulder			
9	Joop van Orsouw			
10	Hylke ten Cate			
11	Bart van Wijck			
12	Pietsje Spijkstra			
13	Hein Meijer			
14	Erik Boshuijzen			
15	Frits Colnot			
16	Cees Steendam Visser			
Total				

== 11: Party for the Animals ==
Candidate list for Party for the Animals
Position	Candidate	Votes	Weighted votes	Result
1	Niko Koffeman			Elected
2	Christine Teunissen			Elected
3	Frank Wassenberg			Replacement
4	Floriske van Leeuwen			Replacement
5	Diederik van Liere			
6	Karen Soeters			
7	Hans Bouma			
8	Ewald Engelen			
9	Paul Cliteur			
10	Peter Nicolaï			
Total				

== 12: Independent Senate Group ==
Candidate list for Independent Senate Group
Position	Candidate	Votes	Weighted votes	Result
1	Hendrik ten Hoeve			Elected
2	Jan van der Starre			
3	Mariska Sloot			
4	Marien Weststrate			
5	Mirjam Hamberg			
6	Theunis Rienk Piersma			
7	Henk Hoiting			
8	Cees van Mourik			
9	Jan Lambers			
10	Harry Visser			
Total				

== See also ==
- List of members of the Senate of the Netherlands, 2015–2019
