= Henk Overbeek =

Dutch academic and politician (born 1949)

Member of the Senate
- In office 4 October 2016 – 10 June 2019
- Preceded by: Tuur Elzinga

Personal details
- Born: Hendrik Willem Overbeek; 13 October 1949 (age 76) Haarlem, Netherlands
- Party: Socialist Party
- Children: 2
- Education: University of Amsterdam
- Occupation: Academic; politician

Hendrik Willem "Henk" Overbeek (Dutch: [ˈɦɛŋk ˈoːvərbeːk]; born 13 October 1949) is a Dutch international relations scholar and politician of the Socialist Party (SP).

== Life and career ==
Overbeek was born in 1949 in Haarlem, and he attended the Murmellius Gymnasium high school in Alkmaar between 1961 and 1967. He studied at Gonzaga University in Spokane, Washington for a year, and he went on to study political and social sciences at the University of Amsterdam. He received his candidate's degree in political science in 1972 and his master's degree in international relations in 1976. Overbeek completed a PhD at the university, earning his degree in January 1988 with a dissertation entitled Global Capitalism and Britain's Decline.

He taught international relations at the University of Amsterdam starting in 1988, and he served simultaneously as an adjunct professor at the Leiden campus of Webster University between 1994 and 2004. He switched to Vrije Universiteit Amsterdam in 1999. He became a professor by special appointment, specialized in transnational politics, in 2001 and a full professor, specialized in international relations, in 2004. Overbeek researched international economics and international regulations for corporate governance, and he was an editor of the journal British Politics. He retired as professor in December 2014, and he subsequently served as head of the organization sciences department until 2021. When he retired, Overbeek said in an interview that the world was in the early stage of a severe crisis, comparable to the one in the 1930s that led to World War II. He pointed at a bad economy, rising inequality, strict budget cuts during the euro area crisis, growing international tensions, and the rise of nationalist movements. He called the NATO alliance the main culprit of the Russo-Ukrainian War, arguing that great powers should respect each other's interests and that NATO's eastward enlargement towards Russia violated promises by the West.

Overbeek ran for the Senate in May 2015 as the SP's 11th candidate, but he was not elected as the party won nine seats. On 4 October 2016, he was sworn into the Senate as the successor of Tuur Elzinga, who had stepped down for a role at the Federation of Dutch Trade Unions (FNV). Overbeek focused on European affairs, foreign affairs, finances, and economic affairs, and his term ended on 10 June 2019.

== Personal life ==
Overbeek is married, and he has two sons. As a senator, he resided in Amstelveen.

== Electoral history ==
Electoral history of Henk Overbeek
| Year | Body | Party | Pos. | Votes | Result | | Ref. |
| Year | Body | Party | Pos. | Votes | Party seats | Individual | Ref. |
|---|---|---|---|---|---|---|---|
| 2015 | Senate | Socialist Party | 11 | 0 | 9 / 75 | Lost (Note: Overbeek was appointed to the body later during the term due to a vacancy.) | |
