= Hamit Karakus =

Dutch alderman and senator

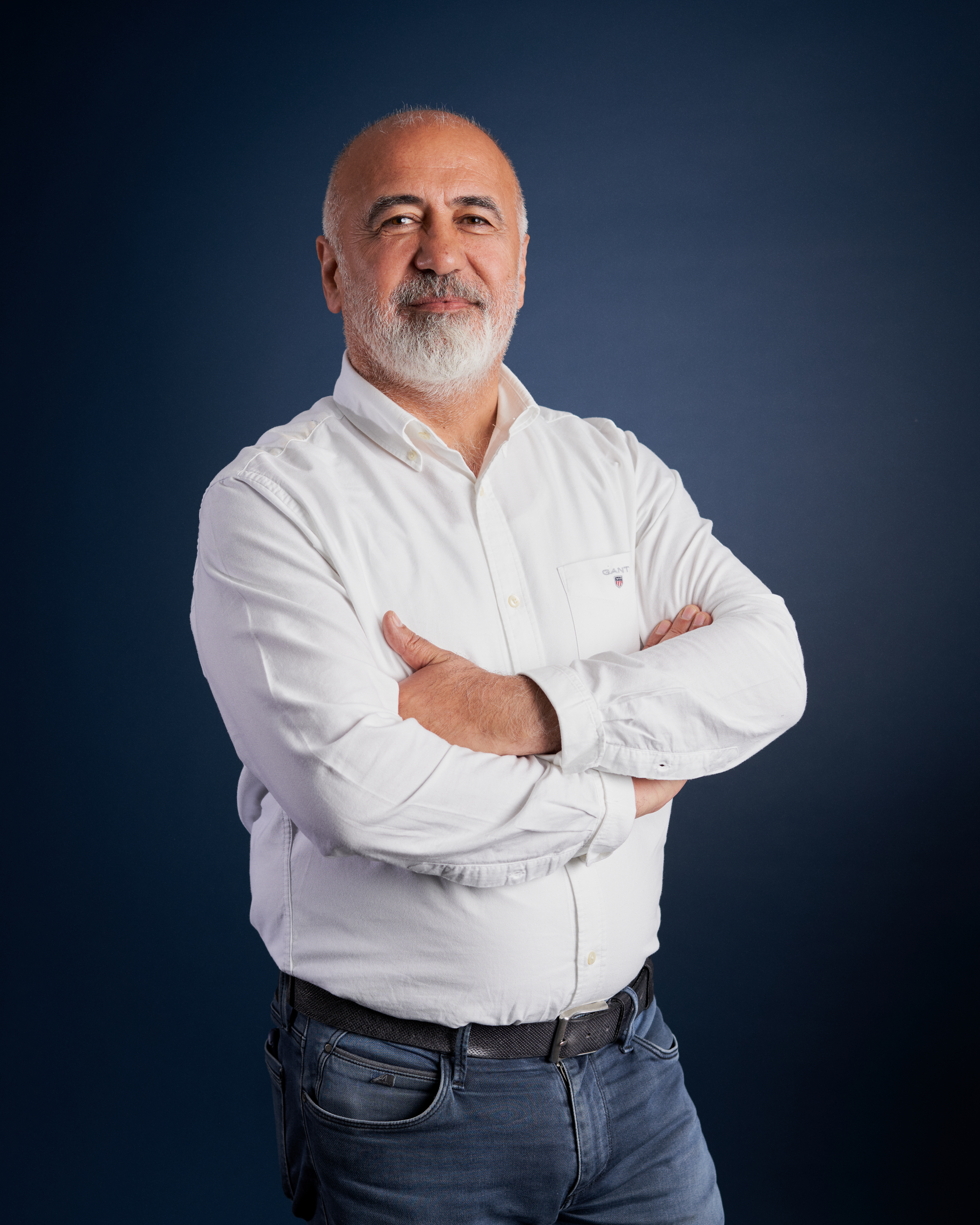
- Karakus in 2022

Member of the Senate
- In office 2 March 2021 – 13 June 2023
- Preceded by: Jopie Nooren

Alderman in Rotterdam
- In office 18 May 2006 – 24 March 2014
- Preceded by: Marco Pastors
- Succeeded by: Ronald Schneider

Member of the Rotterdam municipal council
- In office 19 March 2010 – 27 May 2010

Personal details
- Born: Hamit Karakus; 22 February 1965 (age 61) Kırşehir, Turkey
- Party: Labour Party
- Spouse: Emine Deniz
- Children: 3
- Education: Politieschool De Cloese

Hamit Karakus (born 22 February 1965) is a Turkish-Dutch politician and police officer, who previously served as a member of the Senate and as an alderman in Rotterdam. He is a member of the Labour Party (PvdA).

Born in Turkey, Karakus grew up in Steenwijk and later moved to Rotterdam to work as a police officer. After ten years of service and reaching the rank of police sergeant, he became deputy director of a real estate brokerage firm in 1998. He continued working there until he was appointed Rotterdam's alderman of housing and spatial planning in 2006. He resigned from that position eight years later, after his party had suffered losses in the 2014 municipal election with Karakus as lijsttrekker.

He subsequently became CEO of the organizations Platform31 and IVO and served as a senator between 2021 and 2023. He was appointed chief of the North Holland police in September 2023.

== Early life and career ==
He was born in 1965 in the Turkish city Kırşehir. He lived in the surrounding countryside, where his parents worked as farmers. Karakus has two brothers and two sisters. His father moved to Western Europe as a migrant worker in the late 1960s and his family joined him in 1973 in the Overijssel city Steenwijk, where Karakus's father worked in a carpet factory.

He attended an lts high school in Steenwijk, where he was trained in metalworking, between 1979 and 1983. His teacher had recommended a havo level education, but Karakus's father preferred a vocational education for his son. Karakus subsequently worked at a warehouse of Heuga, the carpet factory that also employed his father.

He followed training to become a policeman at De Cloese in the Gelderland town Lochem in the years 1987–88. Thereafter, Karakus joined the Rotterdam-Rijnmond police force, working for seven years as an officer in the northern part of Rotterdam and for three years as a police sergeant in the nearby city Schiedam. He was also involved in investigating organized crime, and he served as a Turkish interpreter and a spokesperson about extortion by the Kurdistan Workers' Party. Furthermore, he promoted the Dutch Police Union between 1991 and 1994.

Karakus left the police in 1998 to work for the real estate brokerage firm Atta Makelaars as deputy director. He continued working there until he became an alderman in 2006.

== Alderman (2006–2014) ==
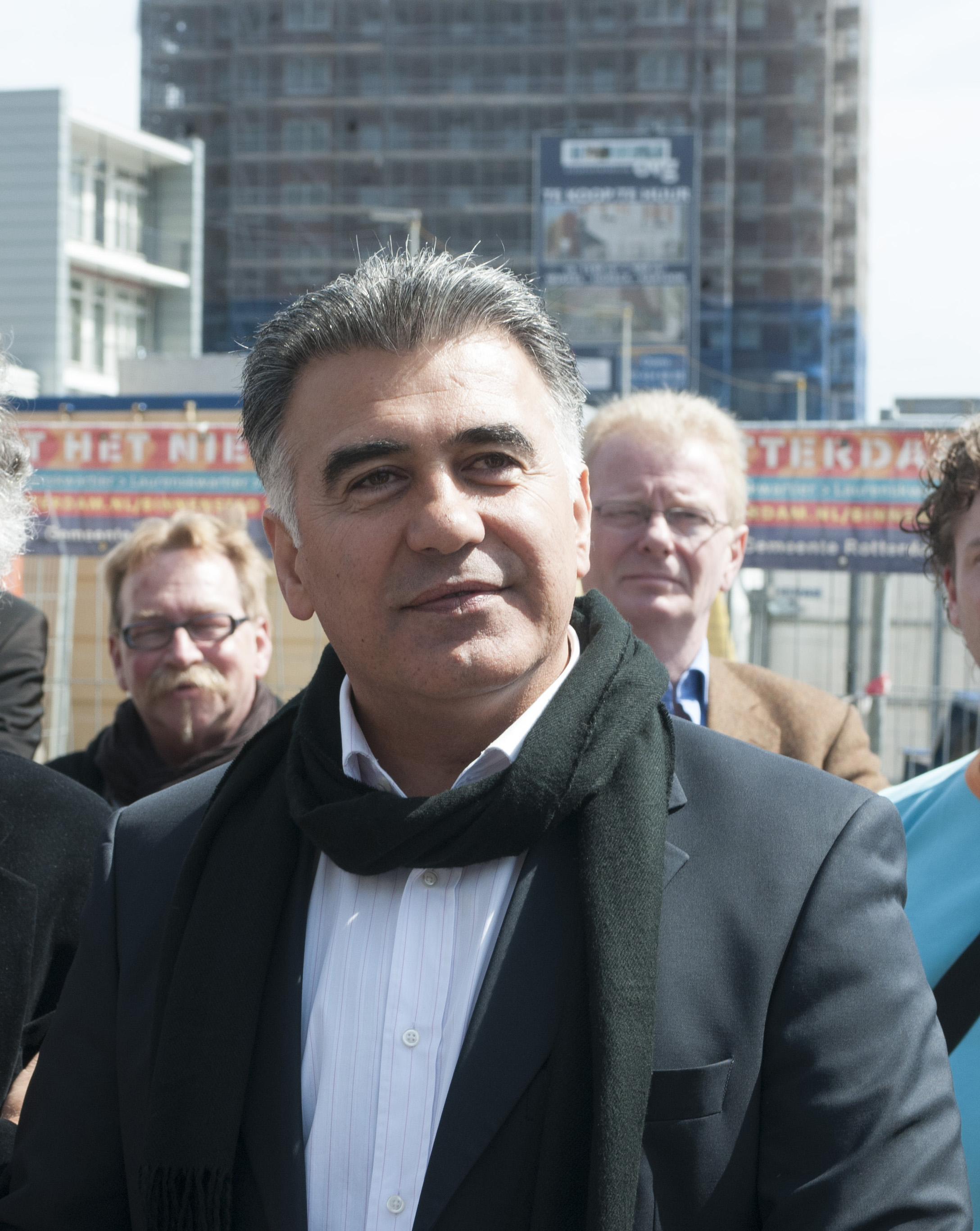
Karakus in 2009

=== Appointment and first term ===
In May 2006, Karakus was appointed alderman of housing and spatial planning in Rotterdam's new municipal executive. Called a political newcomer by De Volkskrant, Karakus's only political experience was serving as the Labour Party's vice-chair in Rotterdam since a number of years. He had become a member of the Labour Party in 2002 in reaction to the rise of politician Pim Fortuyn. Karakus was a proponent of adding skyscrapers to the city's skyline and was focused on dealing with slumlords, mortgage fraud, and nuisance from Eastern European migrant workers.

Under his leadership, Rotterdam continued its policy of keeping out new renters living off welfare in certain disadvantaged neighborhoods to prevent their deterioration – known as the Rotterdamwet. The municipality also purchased all properties in Rotterdam owned by real estate investor Cees Engel, worth over €10 million, as the municipality was dissatisfied with Engel's practices. Besides, the deal prohibited Engel from acquiring new buildings in the region in the future. To tackle problems surrounding the housing of Eastern European migrant workers, Karakus organized a summit for municipalities in December 2007. The following year, Rotterdam announced that in disadvantaged neighborhoods a maximum of two people with different last names could be registered per house to prevent overcrowding, and it announced that office buildings and buildings due for demolition would be converted into housing for Eastern Europeans.

During the 2008 financial crisis, Karakus and finance alderman Lucas Bolsius provided €200 million for purchasing the land under construction projects to give developers the funds to continue the projects. Later that year, Karakus established a new policy under which housing corporations could evict and refuse renters who have repeatedly disturbed their neighborhood.

=== Second term and 2014 election ===
Karakus wanted to become the Labour Party's lijsttrekker in Rotterdam in the 2010 municipal election, but he lost in a three-way election among members of the party to fellow alderman Dominic Schrijer. Karakus received 40% of the vote. He was eventually elected to the municipal council as the PvdA's second candidate. He stayed on as an alderman in the new executive after the election and thus automatically resigned from the municipal council in May 2010. His nomination as alderman was not supported by the members of Livable Rotterdam, who Karakus had accused of sowing hatred and division during the campaign.

He continued his fight against slumlords in his second term, successfully calling on the national government to make it easier for the municipality to prohibit such landlords from renting and to expropriate their properties. In late 2012, internal documents were leaked to the media which raised doubts about the fire safety of Islamic boarding schools. Municipal councilors criticized Karakus for not having closed them, but Karakus said that they were safe enough. The municipality filed a criminal complaint because of the leak. Karakus became deputy mayor of Rotterdam next to his position as alderman in April 2013, when alderwoman Jantine Kriens resigned from that position. An apartment building specifically for Eastern European migrants (Polenhotel) in Rotterdam was opened in early 2014 under Karakus's leadership to combat bad housing conditions.

In September 2013, Karakus announced his candidacy for the Labour Party's lijsttrekker in the 2014 Rotterdam municipal election. Karakus won the leadership election from his two opponents with 45% of the vote. Later in the year, an inhabitant of Rotterdam, who was reported to have a conflict with the municipality over a building, was arrested for planning to have Karakus killed. During the campaign, Karakus was criticized when he promised to a crowd in Turkish the construction of wedding halls, while the borough had the power to decide the issue. In the 2014 election, the Labour Party lost six of its fourteen seats, causing the party to lose its plurality in the municipal council to Livable Rotterdam. Karakus announced five days after the election that he would immediately quit as the PvdA's leader in Rotterdam, that he would resign as alderman, and that he would not accept his seat in the municipal council due to the election loss. He received the Wolfert van Borselen medal from Mayor Ahmed Aboutaleb during his farewell.

== Post-aldermanship ==
Karakus became CEO of Platform31, which researches and gives advice about urban development, in September 2014. Three and a half years later, in March 2018, he also became CEO of IVO, a research institute focussed on socially vulnerable groups, marking the beginning of a cooperation between IVO and Platform31. Besides, Karakus joined a number of advisory and supervisory boards of organizations including the Rotterdam University of Applied Sciences, educational foundation Stichting BOOR, Stichting Nederlandse Register Vastgoed Taxateurs, and housing corporation Eigen Haard.

Interior minister Kajsa Ollongren hired him in February 2019 in order to help governments and housing corporations make agreements about public housing in areas in which Vestia was active. Due to its financial problems, Vestia was unable to adequately invest in public housing. It was announced in 2020 that fifteen other housing corporations would take over about 10,000 Vestia properties with financial support from the government.

=== Senate (2021–2023) ===
Karakus appeared seventh of the Labour Party's party list in the 2019 Senate election and was not elected, as his party won six seats. When Senator Jopie Nooren vacated her seat two years later because of a position at the Hogeschool van Amsterdam, Karakus filled the vacancy. He was sworn in on 2 March 2021 as the first Turkish-Dutch senator in Dutch parliamentary history, and he remained in all his other positions. He was the Labour Party's spokesperson for water management, agriculture, nature, environment, infrastructure, animal welfare, fishery, public health, welfare, and sport, and he was a member of the following committees:

- Committee for Infrastructure, Water Management and Environment (vice-chair)
- Committee for Economic Affairs and Climate Policy / Agriculture, Nature and Food Quality
- Committee for Immigration and Asylum / JHA Council
- Committee for Justice and Security
- Committee for Health, Welfare and Sport

Karakus announced in July 2021 that he would leave Platform31 and IVO, and his successor was installed in February 2022. Around that time, he became chair of a new independent five-member committee to advise the Rotterdam police on diversity, inclusivity, discrimination, and racism. He also started serving as program director of a project to improve the Westwijk, a deprived neighborhood in Vlaardingen, in early 2022. Karakus called creating support for people living in poverty his first priority in solving its issues. He decided to not run for re-election as senator in 2023. Broadcaster NOS reported that the party leadership had not followed the advice of the party committee by giving Karakus a worse spot on the party list. His term ended on 13 June 2023.

=== Chief of police ===
Karakus was appointed chief of police for the province of North Holland on 1 September 2023. He became the first Turkish-Dutch person to occupy the office. The police force has 3,500 officers and is headquartered in Haarlem.

== Personal life ==
Karakus lives in Rotterdam. He is married to Emine Deniz, and they have two daughters and one son. He has renounced his Turkish citizenship to avoid conscription.
