= Alexander van Hattem =

Dutch politician (born 1983)

Leader of the Party for Freedom in the Senate of the Netherlands
- Incumbent
- Assumed office 16 January 2024
- Preceded by: Marjolein Faber

Member of the Senate
- Incumbent
- Assumed office 9 June 2015

Personal details
- Born: 6 June 1983 (age 43) Westerhoven, Netherlands
- Party: PVV (2008–present)
- Other political affiliations: LPF (2002–2008)
- Education: Avans Hogeschool

Alexander Wilhelm Joannes Abraham van Hattem (born 6 June 1983) is a Dutch politician who has been a member of the Senate for the Party for Freedom since 2015 and is a member of the Provincial Council of North Brabant. He currently serves as the PVV faction spokesman in the Senate.

== Biography ==
=== Early life and career ===
Van Hattem attended the SG Were Di grammar school in Valkenswaard and then studied history at Radboud University. He subsequently completed a law course at Avans Hogeschool in Tilburg and has run a legal consultancy firm since 2005. He has also worked as a project employee for local municipalities.

=== Politics ===
Van Hattem was previously a member of the Pim Fortuyn List (LPF) and was chairman of the LPF's youth wing Jonge Fortuynisten. He worked for the LPF municipal faction in Eindhoven and during the 2006 Dutch general election he stood as a candidate for the LPF in which the party ran as List 5 Fortuyn but was not elected. After the LPF was dissolved, he remained as chairman of the Jonge Fortuynisten which continued as an independent political organisation. He subsequently worked as an intern for the Party for Freedom and was elected to the Provincial Council of North Brabant in 2014 where he served as chairman of the Culture and Society Committee. That same year he encountered some controversy when he expressed support for controversial remarks made by Geert Wilders about Moroccan immigrants. After calls from other parties for him to be removed from the Culture and Society Committee, van Hatten apologized and was allowed to keep his position. In 2015, he was elected to sit in the Senate for the PVV.

Van Hattem was reelected for the Netherlands Senate for another term in May 2023 and later succeeded Marjolein Faber as the PVV's leader in the Senate after she was elected to the House of Representatives. He has also been a municipal councilor in 's-Hertogenbosch since 2018.

== Electoral history ==
Electoral history of Alexander van Hattem
Year	Body	Party	Pos.	Votes	Result		Ref.
Year	Body	Party	Pos.	Votes	Party seats	Individual	Ref.
2003	Provincial Council of North Brabant	Pim Fortuyn List	13		2	Lost	
2006	Eindhoven Municipal Council	Pim Fortuyn List	8		1	Lost	
2006	House of Representatives	Pim Fortuyn List	11	136	0	Lost	
2010	Eindhoven Municipal Council	Pim Fortuyn List	10	37	2	Lost	
2011	Provincial Council of North Brabant	Party for Freedom	4		8	Won	
2012	House of Representatives	Party for Freedom	36	213	15	Lost	
2015	Provincial Council of North Brabant	Party for Freedom	1		7	Won	
2015	Senate	Party for Freedom	9	3,171 (Note: Weighted votes)	9	Won	
2017	House of Representatives	Party for Freedom	48	205	20	Lost	
2018	's-Hertogenbosch Municipal Council	Party for Freedom	1		1	Won	
2019	Provincial Council of North Brabant	Party for Freedom	1		4	Won	
2019	Senate	Party for Freedom	3	1	5	Won	
2022	's-Hertogenbosch Municipal Council	Party for Freedom	1	1,199	1	Won	
2023	Provincial Council of North Brabant	Party for Freedom	1	47,165	4	Won	
2023	Senate	Party for Freedom	3		4	Won	
2023	House of Representatives	Party for Freedom	44	416	37	Lost	
2025	House of Representatives	Party for Freedom	79	144	26	Lost	
2026	's-Hertogenbosch Municipal Council	Party for Freedom	1	1,528	1	Won	
