= Gom van Strien =

Dutch politician (born 1951)

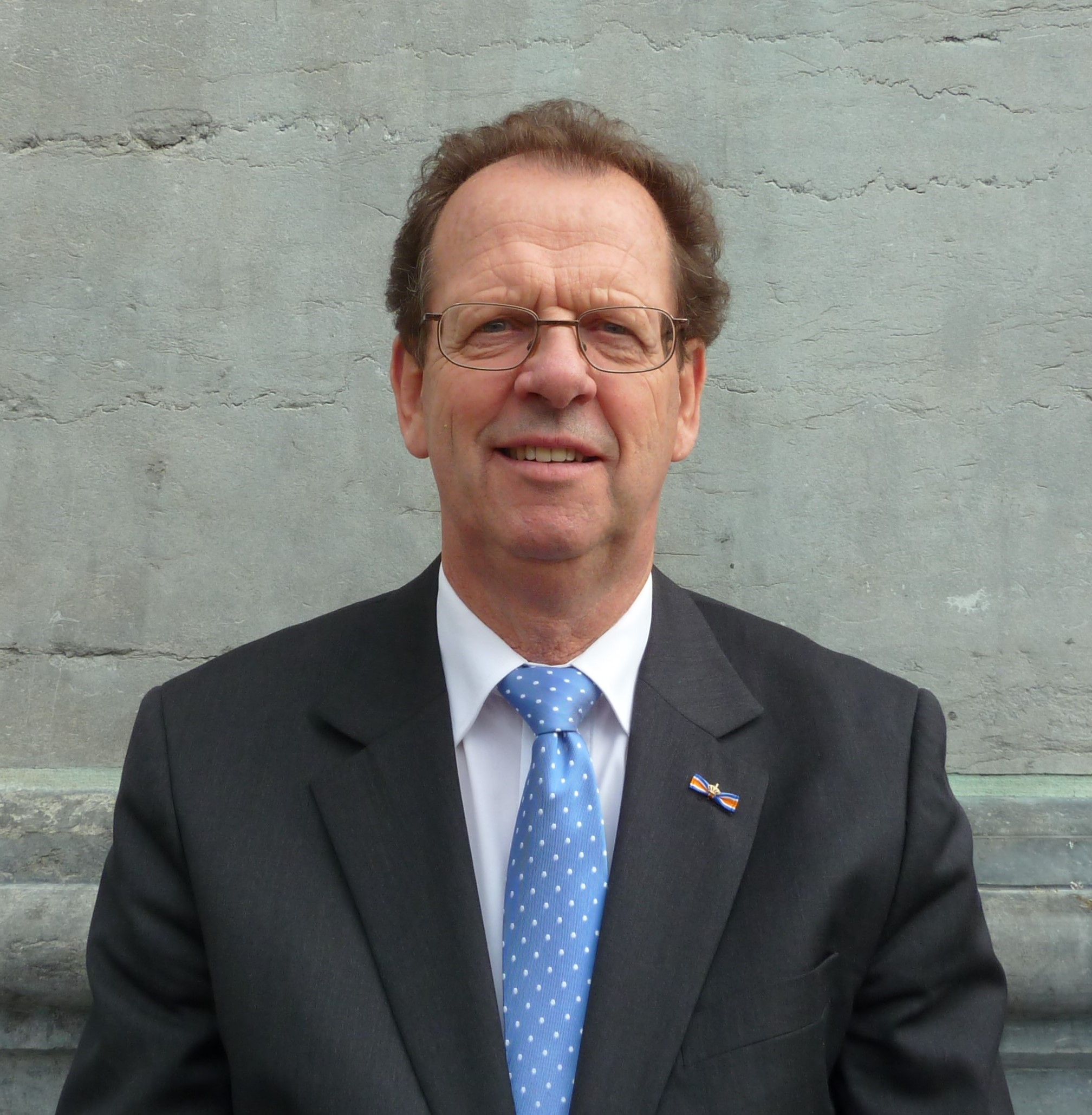
- Gom van Strien

Member of the Senate
- Incumbent
- Assumed office 7 June 2011

Personal details
- Born: Gommarus Adrianus van Strien; 10 June 1951 (age 75) Geertruidenberg, Netherlands
- Party: Party for Freedom (since 2009)
- Other political affiliations: People's Party for Freedom and Democracy (until 1999)
- Education: Katholieke Universiteit Nijmegen; University of Twente

Gommarus Adrianus "Gom" van Strien (born 10 June 1951) is a Dutch politician, he has been a member of the Senate for the Party for Freedom since 7 June 2011. He has served as deputy parliamentary leader since 25 September 2012. He was named formation scout after the 2023 Dutch general election but resigned within days, after he was linked to a fraud case involving his former employer, Utrecht Holdings.

== Early life and career ==
Van Strien was born in Geertruidenberg on 10 June 1951. He studied physics at the Catholic University Nijmegen between 1970 and 1976. He then studied business administration at the University of Twente between 1976 and 1978. From his graduation until 1986 he worked for Statistics Netherlands, he then worked one year for Rijkswaterstaat and then started working for Utrecht University. At the university he was first secretary and later director of the faculty of veterinary medicine. From 2000 until 2009 he was managing director of Utrecht Holdings, the knowledge transfer office of Utrecht University and UMC Utrecht. From 2009 until 2011 he was director of TrekhaakCentrum.nl.

== Political career ==
From 1984 to 1988 van Strien served as chair of the local organization of the People's Party for Freedom and Democracy in Alphen aan den Rijn. Fellow party members called his term in office as unremarkable apart for his sudden departure. In 1999 he left the party after being disillusioned with the change in leadership from Frits Bolkestein to Hans Dijkstal.

In 2009 sent an application letter to Geert Wilders to become a member of the Senate for the Party for Freedom. After the 2011 Dutch Senate election van Strien became a member of the Senate for the party on 7 June 2011. He has served as deputy parliamentary leader since 25 September 2012. In 2015 he called the Senate a fake parliament. In the senate he mostly deals with financial issues. He was second on the Party for Freedom list for the 2019 Dutch Senate election and was reelected.

=== Formation scout and fraud case ===
After the 2023 Dutch general election he was named formation scout on a proposal of election winner Geert Wilders on 24 November 2023. Wilders called him someone "with not too great a political profile". Shortly after being named he stated he did not remember his 2015 remark of the Senate as a fake parliament. In the weekend following his nomination Dutch newspaper NRC Handelsblad published an article implicating van Strien in a fraud case brought forth by his former employer, Utrecht Holdings. Van Strien denied the allegations. On the morning of 27 November 2023, the day of his intended start as formation scout, he stated that he would lay down his tasks as formation scout. Van Strien later stated that it was a mistake that he did not inform Wilders of the allegations when he was considered for formation scout. He had discussed the matter with Party for Freedom Senate leader Marjolein Faber and both decided it was best not to bother Wilders with the matter.

His home in Arcen was raided by the Fiscal Information and Investigation Service (FIOD) in May 2024 as part of an investigation into the criminal complaint by Utrecht Holdings. In a civil case against Van Strien's successor as managing director of Utrecht Holdings, a court of appeals concluded in November 2024 that Van Strien and his successor had obtained a stake in a spin-off company of the university, which held shares of two biomedical companies, by hiding their involvement in a separate entity called Hereswint. This entity, jointly owned by Van Strien's wife, his neighbor, a friend, and the wife of his successor, received €2 million in dividends between 2006 and 2018 due to its stake in the spin-off company. Hereswint was established by his neighbor at Van Strien's direction. In reply to the ruling, Van Strien called it disgraceful that his conduct was judged without him being heard.

== Personal life ==
Van Strien is married and has three children. He is fond of maritime history and genealogy and wrote a book on his own family's history. He was made Knight in the Order of Orange-Nassau on 21 February 2009.

== Electoral history ==
Electoral history of Gom van Strien
Year	Body	Party	Pos.	Votes	Result		Ref.
Year	Body	Party	Pos.	Votes	Party seats	Individual	Ref.
2010	House of Representatives	Party for Freedom	48 (Note: Van Strien participated as lijstduwer.)	1,002	24	Lost	
2015	Senate	Party for Freedom	2	1,190 (Note: Weighted votes)	9	Won	
2017	House of Representatives	Party for Freedom	50	728	20	Lost	
2019	Senate	Party for Freedom	2	0	5	Won	
2021	House of Representatives	Party for Freedom	50	790	17	Lost	
2023	House of Representatives	Party for Freedom	45	1,230	37	Lost	
