= Martin van Beek =

Dutch politician (1960–2018)

Member of the Senate
- In office 4 July 2018 – 26 August 2018
- In office 14 February 2018 – 14 March 2018
- In office 28 March 2017 – 25 October 2017
- In office 2 October 2012 – 9 June 2015

Personal details
- Born: 1 April 1960 Ridderkerk, Netherlands
- Died: 26 August 2018 (aged 58) Leersum, Netherlands
- Party: Party for Freedom

Marinus Jan "Martin" van Beek (Dutch pronunciation: [ˈmɑrtɪɱ vɑm ˈbeːk]; 1 April 1960 – 26 August 2018) was a Dutch politician representing the Party for Freedom in the Senate.

Between 2006 and 2009, van Beek studied New Business Development at the Business School Nederland, earning an MBA.

He was a member of the Dutch Senate between 2 October 2012 and 9 June 2015 and again from 28 March 2017 until 25 October 2017, when he was temporarily replaced by Max Aardema due to illness. He returned on 14 February 2018 and left once again on 14 March 2018 to be replaced by Aardema once more. Van Beek returned to the Senate on 4 July 2018.

Van Beek died at the age of 58 in Leersum on 26 August 2018 due to an accident. At the time of his death he was owner of a wholesale business in medical products.

== Electoral history ==
Electoral history of Martin van Beek
Year	Body	Party	Pos.	Votes	Result		Ref.
Year	Body	Party	Pos.	Votes	Party seats	Individual	Ref.
2015	Senate	Party for Freedom	10	0	9	Lost (Note: Van Beek was appointed to the body later during the term due to a vacancy.)	
