= Danai van Weerdenburg =

Dutch politician

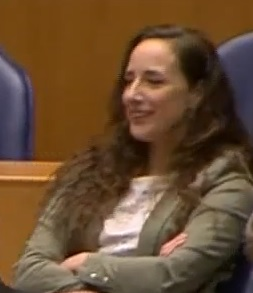

Member of the House of Representatives
- In office 23 March 2017 – 5 December 2023

Member of the Senate
- In office 9 June 2015 – 22 March 2017

Personal details
- Born: 1 August 1976 (age 50) Amstelveen
- Party: Party for Freedom
- Education: University of Amsterdam

Danai van Weerdenburg (born 1 August 1976) is a Dutch politician of the Party for Freedom, who was a member of the Senate from 2015 until 2017 and an MP between 2017 and 2023.

== Electoral history ==
Electoral history of Danai van Weerdenburg
Year	Body	Party	Pos.	Votes	Result		Ref.
Year	Body	Party	Pos.	Votes	Party seats	Individual	Ref.
2015	Senate	Party for Freedom	6	502 (Note: Weighted votes)	9	Won	
2021	House of Representatives	Party for Freedom	12	840	17	Won	
