= Mary Fiers =

Dutch politician

- Mary Fiers in 2022

Member of the Senate
- In office 3 April 2018 – 11 June 2019
- Incumbent
- Assumed office 12 October 2021

Personal details
- Born: Maria Catharina Theresia Fiers; 5 October 1968 (age 58) Bladel, Netherlands
- Party: PvdA (until 2026); PRO (from 2026)
- Education: Catholic University of Brabant (1992–1998)

Maria Catharina Theresia (Mary) Fiers (born 5 October 1968) is a Dutch politician. She is a member of the Dutch Senate for Progressief Nederland (PRO), having previously served between 2018 and 2019 and from 2021 onward for the Labour Party (PvdA).

== Early life ==
Mary Fiers was born on 5 October 1968 in Bladel. After completing secondary school in Bladel, Fiers trained to become a surgical assistent in Eindhoven from 1986 to 1989 while working at the Diaconessenhuis hospital in Eindhoven. She would work at the hospital until 1999. From 1992 to 1999, Fiers studied Public Administration and Organization Science at the Catholic University Brabant (today known as Tilburg University). She then worked as a manager in addiction care until 2006. From 2014 to 2025, Fiers led the Green Development Fund Brabant.

== Political career ==
Fiers began her political career in 2002, when she was elected to the municipal council of Eindhoven as a member of the Labour Party (PvdA). In 2006, Fiers became alderwoman and deputy mayor of Eindhoven, responsible for housing, urban planning, citizen participation, water and environment, monuments and caravan (woonwagen) policy. She headed the PvdA electoral list in Eindhoven in the 2010 municipal elections. In 2013, Fiers resigned following a scandal regarding the moving of traveller caravans.

In 2018, Fiers first became a member of the Senate, replacing Jeannette Beuving. She left the Senate a year later. In 2021 Fiers returned to the Senate, replacing Esther-Mirjam Sent after Sent became chairperson of the PvdA. As a senator, Fiers has focused on internal affairs and digitalization. In 2026, Fiers was appointed as informateur in the municipality of Eindhoven, tasked with finding a workable governing coalition.
