= Petra Stienen =

Dutch politician (born 1965)

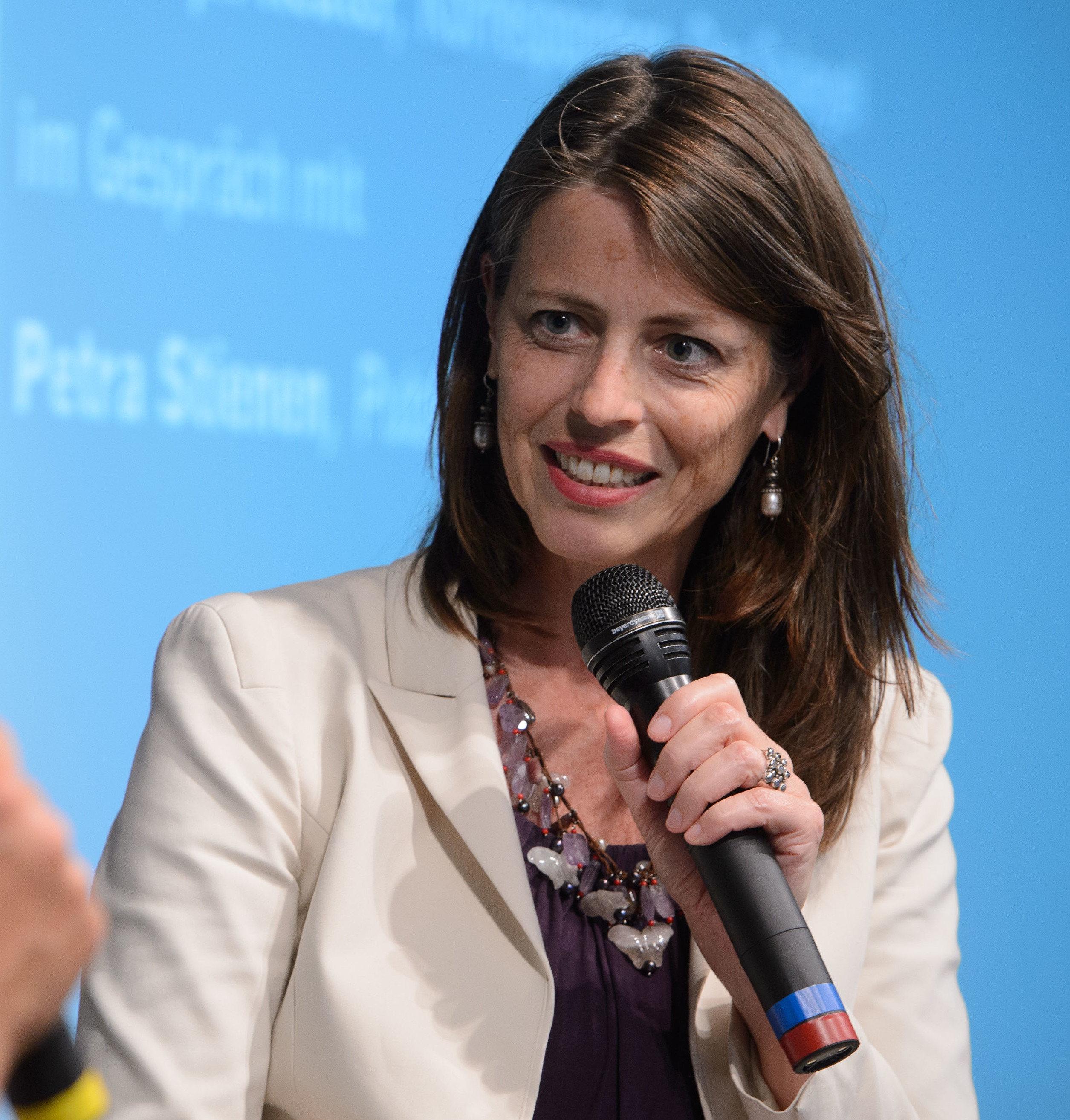
- Stienen in 2015

Senator of the Netherlands
- Incumbent
- Assumed office 9 June 2015

Personal details
- Born: Catharina Petra Wilhelmina Johanna Stienen; 8 May 1965 (age 61) Roermond, Netherlands
- Party: Democrats 66 (from 2015)
- Education: Leiden University; Cairo University; SOAS University of London
- Occupation: Politician writer columnist diplomat
- Website: www.petrastienen.nl

Petra Stienen (born 1965) is a Dutch human rights advocate with more than thirty years’ experience in diplomacy, international relations, civil society, social entrepreneurship and politics.

After a career as a diplomat for the Netherlands and her work as an independent advisor, she was elected in June 2015 as a member of the Senate representing the Democrats 66 political party. Stienen is renowned for her insightful political commentary on the Arab world, particularly during the Arab revolutions, where she focused on amplifying diverse voices advocating for social justice, dignity, and equality.

== Early life and education ==
Petra Stienen was born in Roermond in the southern part of the Netherlands. Raised in modest circumstances, with her father working as a house painter and her mother as a housewife, she was brought up in the Roman Catholic faith. Her background profoundly influenced her commitment to advancing human rights, especially for girls and women, while championing equal opportunities and social justice for all.

She pursued her studies in Arabic language at Leiden University and Cairo University, eventually earning a master's degree in Middle Eastern studies from the School of Oriental and African Studies in the United Kingdom.

== Diplomatic career (1992 - 2009) ==
In 1992, Stienen embarked on her diplomatic career, joining the Dutch Ministry of Foreign Affairs. She was stationed in Cairo until 1999, where her work focused on human rights, development, and culture. From 1999 to 2004, she served in Damascus, Syria, addressing asylum and human rights issues. Upon returning to the Netherlands in 2004, she became a senior policy official at the Gender department of the Dutch Ministry of Foreign Affairs. From 2005 to 2009, she assumed the role of deputy head of the North America department, concentrating on bilateral relations with the United States.

== Strategic advisor, author, public speaker, and leadership coach (2010 - present) ==
In September 2009, Petra Stienen left her diplomatic career behind to pursue a consultancy path. Her clients included government agencies, non-governmental organizations, governments, and international companies. Her columns were regularly featured in the feminist magazine Opzij and the daily newspaper the Limburger, she also wrote for NRC Handelsblad and de Volkskrant. Stienen authored four books during this period. She became a well-known television and radio commentator on Middle Eastern politics, particularly during the Arab revolutions, and frequently engaged as a public speaker on topics such as the role of the Netherlands and Europe in the Middle East, integration, women's rights, and gender equality.

Additionally, she is recognized for her professional moderation of conferences and seminars related to international affairs, human rights, and gender equality. Stienen has also coached leaders across various domains on charismatic leadership.

== Political career ==
In the 2015 Dutch Senate election, Stienen was elected as a representative of the Democrats 66 party and was sworn in on 9 June 2015. She made significant legislative contributions, including the passage of the Environmental Act bill. In 2019, she was elected for a second term, with a focus on asylum and migration legislation. Stienen was a member of the parliamentary inquiry committee on anti-discrimination legislation and played a key role in the adoption of a feminist foreign policy by the Dutch government.

As a member of the Dutch Senate, Stienen has served on the Netherlands delegation to the Parliamentary Assembly of the Council of Europe (PACE) since 2017, and she led the delegation from 2019 to 2023. She has been a member of the Alliance of Liberals and Democrats for Europe (ALDE-PACE group) and served on committees related to equality, non-discrimination, migration, and human rights.

== Other activities ==
Petra Stienen believes in giving part of her time to voluntary work and board memberships in the cultural and social sector. This is a selection of her activities:

- Board member the social housing organisation Wonen Limburg (2019 – present)
- Chair of the board of the Bonnefanten museum in Maastricht (2019 – present)
- Action For Hope, Member of the Board and general assembly (2015 – present)
- European Council on Foreign Relations (ECFR), Member of the Council (2014 - 2022)
- Masterpeace, Member of the Board (2010 - 2016)
- Care International, Member of the Netherlands and international board (2009 - 2015)

== Awards and honours ==
In February 2012, Stienen was awarded the Women in the Media Award 2011 in recognition of her communication talent. In 2013 the province of Limburg awarded her with the Prince Bernhard Culture Fund Limburg Inspiration Prize for her writings on diversity and inclusion. In 2016, Stienen was awarded the Aletta Jacobs Prize by the University of Groningen for "using her work to represent and transmit the voices of women who would otherwise not be heard".

== Personal life ==
Stienen resides in The Hague.

== Publications ==
- Dromen van een Arabische lente. Een Nederlandse diplomate in het Midden-Oosten (English: Dreaming of an Arab spring. A Dutch diplomat in the Middle East). New Amsterdam, Amsterdam, 2008.
- Het andere Arabische geluid. Een nieuwe toekomst voor het Midden-Oosten? (English:The other Arabic sound. A new future for the Middle East?). New Amsterdam, Amsterdam, 2012.
- Terug naar de Donderberg. Portret van een wereldwijk (English: Back to the Donderberg. Portrait of a Global Neighbourhood). New Amsterdam, Amsterdam, 2015.
- Vergroot je charisma & krijg meer aandacht voor je verhaal. (English: Increase your charisma & get more attention for your story) Co-authored with Maximiliaan Winkelhuis. Nieuw Amsterdam. Amsterdam, 2019.
