= Avans University of Applied Sciences =

Public university in Breda, Netherlands

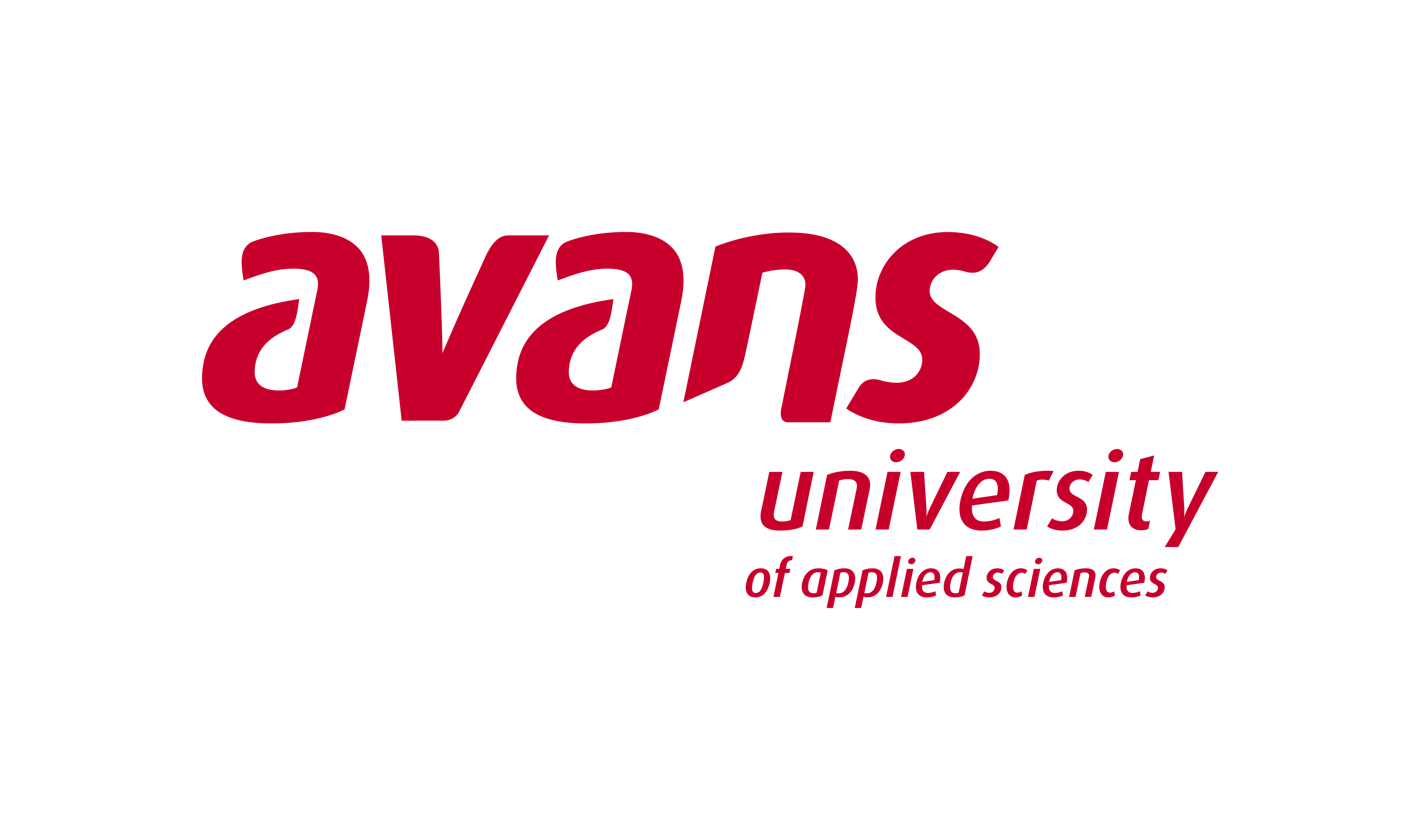
- Type: Public University of Applied Sciences
- Established: 1812
- Affiliations: Erasmus, UASNL, SURF
- Administrative staff: 3,000
- Students: 35,000
- Location: Breda, Netherlands; 51.5839°N 4.7971°E
- Campus: Breda 's-Hertogenbosch Tilburg
- Colours: Avans Red, black & white
- Website: avans.nl

Avans University of Applied Sciences (Dutch: Avans Hogeschool) is a Dutch high ranked vocational university. It is located in three cities: Breda, 's-Hertogenbosch, and Tilburg. The school has over 30,000 students studying 40 courses in 18 institutes. There are 3,000 employees.

Avans University of Applied Sciences itself was founded on 1 January 2004, as a union of Hogeschool 's-Hertogenbosch and Hogeschool Brabant in Tilburg, Breda, and Etten-Leur. Hogeschool Brabant itself was a union from 1988 of Hogeschool West-Brabant (Etten-Leur and Breda) and Hogeschool Midden-Brabant (Tilburg). The oldest branch of Avans University of Applied Sciences is the Kunstacademie in 's-Hertogenbosch, which was founded in 1812.

== Recognition and ranking ==
Avans University of Applied Sciences was declared by independent researcher Keuzegids HBO as the best major University of Applied Sciences in the Netherlands up till 2022.

== English studies ==
Bachelor's (4 years)

- Environmental Science for Sustainability, Ecosystems and Technology (ESSET), in Breda
- Industrial Engineering and Management, in Breda
- International Business and Languages, in 's-Hertogenbosch
- International Business and Management Studies, in Breda
- International Financial Management, in Breda

Master's

The Master Institute of Visual Cultures awards degrees in the following:

- Master of Animation, in Breda & 's-Hertogenbosch
- Master of Situated Design, in 's-Hertogenbosch
- Master of Ecology Futures, in 's-Hertogenbosch
- Master of Visual Arts and Post-Contemporary Practice, in 's-Hertogenbosch

And has plenty of other courses (exchange) to offer, for example, courses like Biobased Energy, Bioinformatics, Biotechnology, Environmental Geography, Global Business & Career, International Business, International Sales, etc.

In 2003 Avans Hogeschool was fined 21 million euros by the Dutch government for frauds, along with some other unsubstantiated charges. Such frauds are collectively known as "HBO fraude" in Dutch.
