= Kees Kok =

Dutch politician (born 1949)

Member of the Senate
- In office 2 October 2012 – 11 June 2019

Member of the States-Provincial of Flevoland
- Incumbent
- Assumed office 24 March 2011

Personal details
- Born: 1 December 1949 (age 76) Gouda, Netherlands
- Party: Party for Freedom
- Children: 2
- Education: Utrecht University
- Profession: Lawyer

Kees Kok (born 1 December 1949) is a Dutch politician, he has been a member of the Senate for the Party for Freedom from 2 October 2012 to 11 June 2019 and the Provincial-Council of Flevoland since 24 March 2011.

Kok studied civil law at Utrecht University between 1970 and 1976, the next year he continued his studies at the same university and studied notary law. He was a candidate-notary in Andel between 1977 and 1982. The next six years he worked for the Dutch Ministry of Finance, followed by six years as a policy advisor at Pension fund ABP. Since 1996 he has been working for the pension executive part of ABP as an advisor.

== Electoral history ==
Electoral history of Kees Kok
Year	Body	Party	Pos.	Votes	Result		Ref.
Year	Body	Party	Pos.	Votes	Party seats	Individual	Ref.
2015	Senate	Party for Freedom	7	3,710 (Note: Weighted votes)	9	Won	
