= Ton van Kesteren =

Dutch politician (born 1954)

Member of the Senate
- Incumbent
- Assumed office 28 March 2017

Member of the States of Groningen
- Incumbent
- Assumed office 10 March 2011

Personal details
- Born: A. J. M. van Kesteren; 26 August 1954 (age 71) Groningen, Netherlands
- Party: Party for Freedom
- Occupation: Teacher, real estate appraiser, politician

A. J. M. "Ton" van Kesteren (born 26 August 1954) is a Dutch politician and real estate appraiser. Representing the Party for Freedom, he has been a member of the States of Groningen since 10 March 2011 and a member of the Senate of the Netherlands since 28 March 2017. He has worked as a teacher from 1978 until 2006 and he has been working as a real estate appraiser since 1996.

== Electoral history ==
Electoral history of Ton van Kesteren
Year	Body	Party	Pos.	Votes	Result		Ref.
Year	Body	Party	Pos.	Votes	Party seats	Individual	Ref.
2011	Provincial Council of Groningen	Party for Freedom				Won	
2012	House of Representatives	Party for Freedom	38	955	15	Lost	
2014	European Parliament	Party for Freedom	8			Lost	
2015	Senate	Party for Freedom	12			Lost (Note: Van Kesteren was appointed to the body later during the term due to a vacancy.)	
2015	Provincial Council of Groningen	Party for Freedom	1	14,925		Won	
2018	Groningen Municipal Council	Party for Freedom	1	2,253			
2019	Provincial Council of Groningen	Party for Freedom	1			Won	
2019	Senate	Party for Freedom	4	272	5	Won	
2022	Groningen Municipal Council	Party for Freedom	3				
2023	Senate	Party for Freedom	4		4	Lost	
2025	House of Representatives	Party for Freedom	75	168	26	Lost	
