= Dannij van der Sluijs =

Dutch politician

Member of the Senate
- In office 28 March 2017 – 11 June 2019

Member of the States of North Holland
- In office 10 March 2011 – 27 March 2019

Personal details
- Born: 24 September 1963 (age 62) Haarlem, Netherlands
- Party: Party for Freedom

Dannij van der Sluijs (born 24 September 1963) is a Dutch politician representing the Party for Freedom. He was a member of the States of North Holland between 10 March 2011 and 27 March 2019, and a member of the Senate from 28 March 2017 to 11 June 2019.

== Electoral history ==
Electoral history of Dannij van der Sluijs
Year	Body	Party	Pos.	Votes	Result		Ref.
Year	Body	Party	Pos.	Votes	Party seats	Individual	Ref.
2015	Senate	Party for Freedom	11	1,506 (Note: Weighted votes)	9	Lost (Note: Van der Sluijs was appointed to the body later during the term due to a vacancy.)	
