= Max Aardema =

Dutch politician (born 1963)

Member of the House of Representatives
- In office 6 December 2023 – 11 November 2025

Member of the Senate
- In office 31 October 2017 – 13 February 2018; 20 March 2018 – 3 July 2018; 16 October 2018 – 11 June 2019

Member of the States of Friesland
- In office 10 March 2011 – 5 December 2023

Personal details
- Born: Marcus Aardema; 11 February 1963 (age 63) Drachten, Netherlands
- Party: Party for Freedom

Marcus "Max" Aardema (Dutch pronunciation: [ˈmɑrkʏs mɑks ˈaːrdəmaː]; born 11 February 1963) is a Dutch politician and former police officer representing the Party for Freedom.

== Career ==
Before entering politics, Aardema was an officer of the Dutch National Police and worked as a coordinator with the crime investigation unit.

He became a member of the States of Friesland on 10 March 2011 and a member of the Senate on 31 October 2017, initially replacing Martin van Beek temporarily. Following the 2023 Dutch general election, he became a member of the House of Representatives for the PVV. His specialties were police, fire brigade, disasters, and legal protection. He was not re-elected in October 2025, and his term ended on 11 November.

=== House committees ===
- Committee for Agriculture, Fisheries, Food Security and Nature (chair)
- Committee for Justice and Security
- Committee for Foreign Trade and Development
- Committee for Asylum and Migration

== Electoral history ==
Electoral history of Max Aardema
Year	Body	Party	Pos.	Votes	Result		Ref.
Year	Body	Party	Pos.	Votes	Party seats	Individual	Ref.
2015	Senate	Party for Freedom	13	600 (Note: Weighted votes)	9	Lost (Note: Aardema was appointed to the body later during the term due to a vacancy.)	
2017	House of Representatives	Party for Freedom	25	1,593	20	Lost	
2019	Senate	Party for Freedom	5	555 (Note: Weighted votes)	5	Lost	
2021	House of Representatives	Party for Freedom	47	831	17	Lost	
2023	House of Representatives	Party for Freedom	19	2,317	37	Won	
2025	House of Representatives	Party for Freedom	27	923	26	Lost	
