= René Dercksen =

Dutch politician (born 1962)

Member of the Senate
- In office 9 June 2015 – 11 June 2019

Personal details
- Born: 11 December 1962 (age 63) Rotterdam, Netherlands
- Party: Belang van Nederland

René G. J. Dercksen (born 11 December 1962) is a Dutch politician who has been a member of the Senate for the Party for Freedom from 9 June 2015 to 11 June 2019.

== Electoral history ==
Electoral history of René Dercksen
Year	Body	Party	Pos.	Votes	Result		Ref.
Year	Body	Party	Pos.	Votes	Party seats	Individual	Ref.
2015	Senate	Party for Freedom	3	516 (Note: Weighted votes)	9	Won	
2023	House of Representatives	Belang van Nederland	4	166	0	Lost	
2024	European Parliament	Belang van Nederland	3	203	0	Lost	
2025	House of Representatives	Belang van Nederland	5	70	0	Lost	
