= Bastiaan van Apeldoorn =

Dutch politician

Member of the Senate
- Incumbent
- Assumed office 9 June 2015

Personal details
- Born: Ernest Bastiaan van Apeldoorn; 22 March 1970 (age 56) Groningen, Netherlands
- Party: SP
- Children: 2
- Education: University of Amsterdam (1988–1994); University of Exeter (1992); York University (1994); European University Institute (1994–1999)

Ernest Bastiaan van Apeldoorn (born 22 March 1970) is a Dutch political scientist and politician. He is a professor of Global Political Economy and Geopolitics at the Vrije Universiteit Amsterdam, having worked there since 2000. Van Apeldoorn has been a member of the Dutch Senate since 2015 for the Socialist Party (SP), where he has been the vice-chair of the SP's senate group since 2024.

== Early life and academic career ==
Bastiaan van Apeldoorn was born on 22 March 1970 in the city of Groningen, where he attended secondary school. He studied political science and international relations at the University of Amsterdam from 1988 to 1994, graduating cum laude. During this period, he also studied at the University of Exeter from January to June 1992 and at York University from January to June 1994. In 1999, Van Apeldoorn obtained his PhD in social and political sciences with distinction after four years at the European University Institute in Florence.

After working as a postdoctoral fellow at the Max Planck Institute from 1998 to 2000, Van Apeldoorn became a lecturer at the Vrije Universiteit Amsterdam in 2000 and an associate professor of international relations in 2006. Van Apeldoorn's research has focused on the role of elite power within political economy and geopolitics, as well as socio-economic governance in Europe, the liberal world order, American foreign policy and globalization. Since 2011, he has led the Amsterdam Global Change Institute at the Vrije Universiteit Amsterdam. In 2018, Van Apeldoorn became a full professor of Global Political Economy and Geopolitics.

== Political career ==
On 9 June 2015, Bastiaan van Apeldoorn became a member of the Dutch Senate for the Socialist Party (SP). As a senator, Van Apeldoorn has focused on education, finance, defense, as well as foreign and European affairs. He has been chair of the commission on European affairs since 2023, previously having led the commission on foreign affairs and development assistance from 2019 to 2023. In 2024, he became vice-chair of the SP's senate group.

== Personal life ==
Van Apeldoorn has two daughters.
