= Esther-Mirjam Sent =

Dutch politician

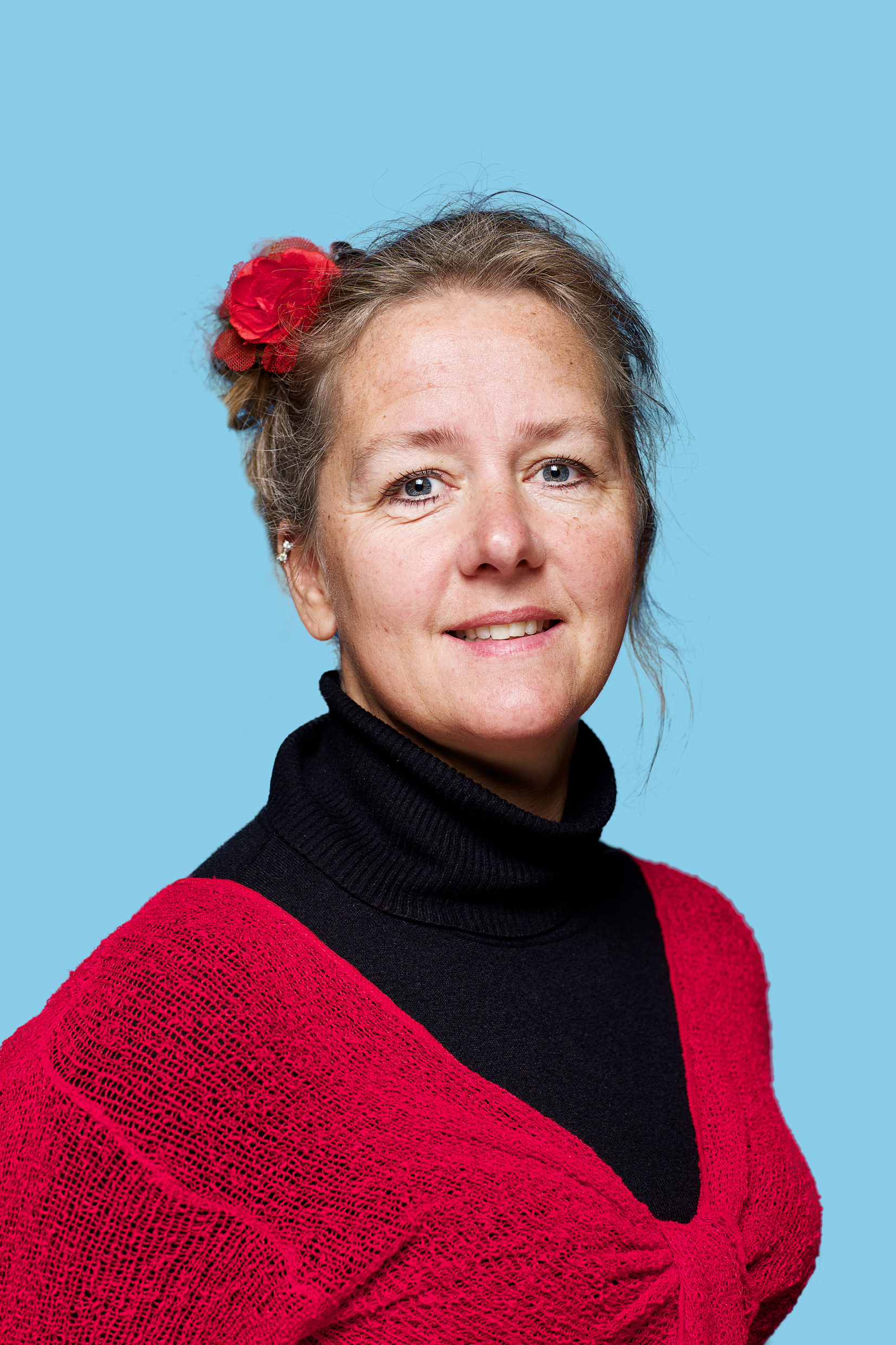
- Esther-Mirjam Sent in 2015

Chair of the Labour Party
- Incumbent
- Assumed office 2 October 2021
- Leader: Lilianne Ploumen
- Preceded by: Nelleke Vedelaar

Member of the Senate
- In office 7 June 2011 – 7 October 2021

Personal details
- Born: 9 March 1967 (age 59) Doesburg, Netherlands
- Party: PvdA
- Education: Universiteit van Amsterdam; Stanford University
- Website: emsent.nl

Esther-Mirjam Sent (born 9 March 1967) is a Dutch economist, academic researcher, university professor, and politician. She has been the chairwoman of the Labour Party since 2021. Before that, she was a member of the Senate from 7 June 2011 to 7 October 2021.

== Biography ==
Sent attended the Rhedens Lyceum in Rozendaal from 1979 to 1985 and studied economics at the University of Amsterdam from 1985 to 1989; she graduated with honors. In 1994 she obtained her PhD in economics from Stanford University in California under the supervision of Nobel Prize winner Kenneth Arrow. Sent is professor of Economic Theory and Economic Policy at Radboud University Nijmegen and lives there. In 2009, 2010 and 2011 she won the prize for most media appearances among professors at Radboud University.

In 2011, Sent was elected to the Senate for the PvdA. On 10 July 2018 Sent became acting party leader in the Senate after the resignation of André Postema. In September 2018, Sent was definitively elected as leader of the PvdA faction in the Senate. In October 2018, Sent announced that he would be a candidate for the PvdA list leader for the Senate elections in 2019. Ultimately, not Sent, but Mei Li Vos was chosen as party leader, and Sent was nominated for second place on the candidate listfor the Senate. This list was ratified at the PvdA congress in January 2019. In June 2019, Sent was succeeded as party chairman by Vos.

At the end of 2019, Sent set herself up as a spokesperson for local residents who protested against the arrival of a new student complex in her neighborhood in Nijmegen. In 2020, Sent was chairman of the committee that compiled the PvdA program for the 2021 House of Representatives elections. This was considered the most left-wing PvdA program in years. On 1 October 2021 Sent was elected party chairman, succeeding Nelleke Vedelaar. On 7 October 2021 she left the Senate because she found membership incompatible with the party chairmanship.

In the autumn of 2022, Sent was discredited due to culpable actions in the handling of complaints about Member of Parliament and fellow party member Gijs van Dijk. However, she refused to be held accountable. In their own words because 'the majority of some of the reporters would not appreciate that'. De Gelderlander reported in March 2024 that Sent had been investigated in 2021 following anonymous complaints by colleagues at Radboud University of unacceptable behavior and intimidation. She was not allowed to return to her department in October 2022 due to a lack of behavioral change. Sent subsequently moved to the university's Honours Academy. When the reports surfaced, Sent denied that complaints against her had been filed, and she gave an alternative explanation for her change of department.
