= Ankie Broekers-Knol =

Dutch politician (born 1946)

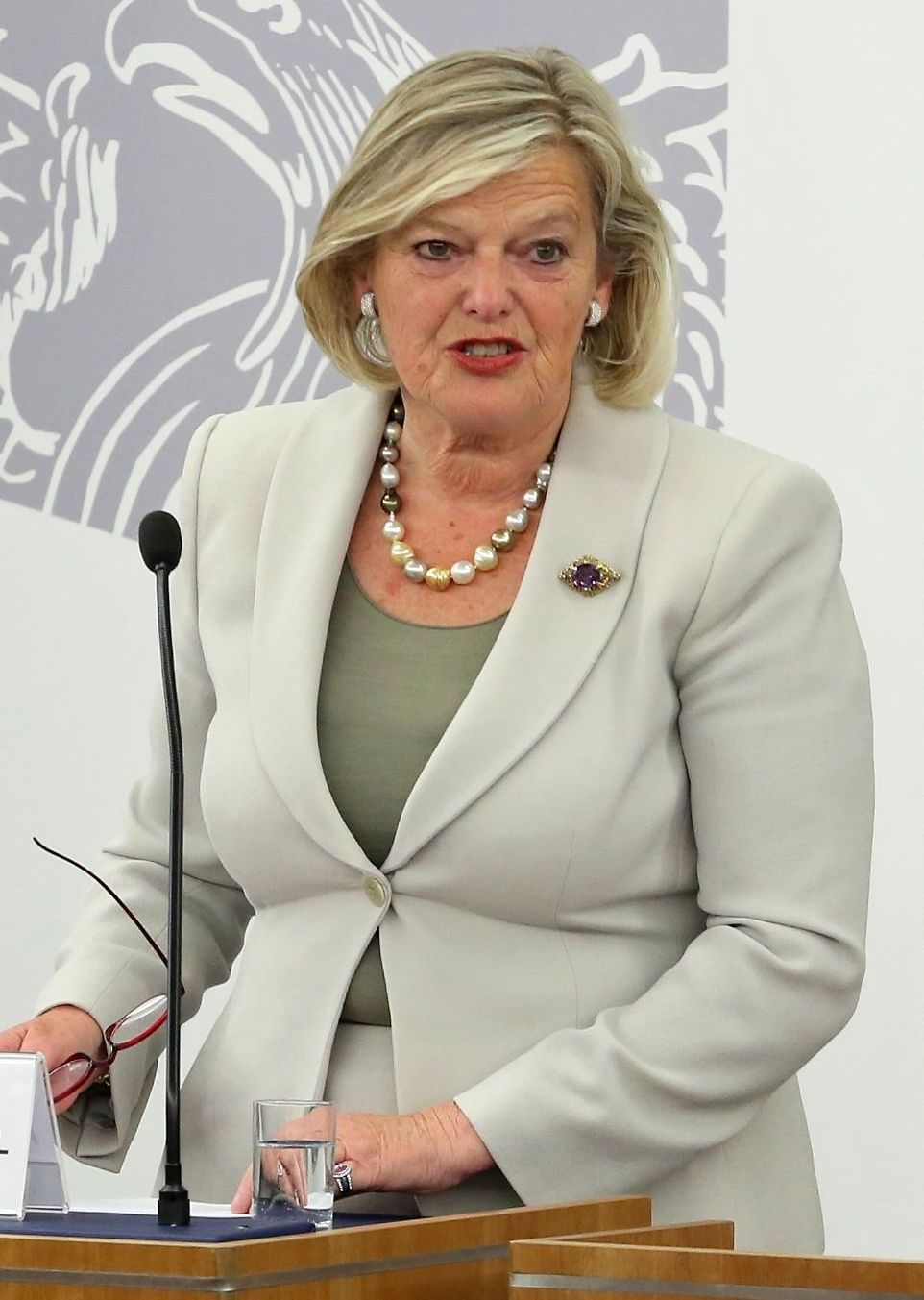
- Broekers-Knol in 2014

State Secretary for Justice and Security
- In office 11 June 2019 – 10 January 2022
- Prime Minister: Mark Rutte
- Preceded by: Mark Harbers
- Succeeded by: Eric van der Burg

President of the Senate
- In office 2 July 2013 – 11 June 2019
- Preceded by: Fred de Graaf
- Succeeded by: Jan Anthonie Bruijn

Member of the Senate
- In office 2 October 2001 – 11 June 2019

Personal details
- Born: Anneke Knol; 23 November 1946 (age 79) Leiden, Netherlands
- Party: People's Party for Freedom and Democracy (from 1969)
- Spouse: Arnoud Cornelis Broekers (m. 1971)
- Children: 2 daughters
- Education: Leiden University (Bachelor of Laws, Master of Laws)
- Occupation: Politician · Jurist · Researcher · Legal educator · Academic administrator
- Website: State Secretary for Security and Justice

Anneke "Ankie" Broekers-Knol (born 23 November 1946) is a Dutch politician and jurist who served as State Secretary for Justice and Security in the Third Rutte cabinet from 11 June 2019 until 10 January 2022. She is a member of the People's Party for Freedom and Democracy (VVD).

She previously served as a member of the Senate from 2 October 2001 until 11 June 2019 and as President of the Senate from 2 July 2013 to 11 June 2019. Broekers-Knol was chair of the Senate's standing committee for Security and Justice. She was formerly director of the Department of Moot Court and Advocacy at Leiden University. She started her political career as a municipal councillor of Bloemendaal (1986–1997) and served as acting mayor of Bloemendaal for a year, from October 2023 to October 2024.

== Electoral history ==
A (possibly incomplete) overview of Dutch elections Broekers-Knol participated in
Election	Party	Candidate number	Votes
1990 Dutch municipal elections in Bloemendaal	People's Party for Freedom and Democracy	4	195
2011 Dutch Senate election	People's Party for Freedom and Democracy		
2015 Dutch Senate election	People's Party for Freedom and Democracy	2	
2018 Dutch municipal elections in Bloemendaal	People's Party for Freedom and Democracy	19	

== Decorations ==
=== National ===
- Knight of the Order of Orange-Nassau (4 June 2019)

=== Foreign ===
- Austria: Grand Decoration of Honour in Gold with Sash of the Decoration of Honour for Services to the Republic of Austria (17 May 2018)
- Italy: Knight Grand Cross of the Order of the Star of Italy (10 May 2017)

Political offices
Preceded by Fred de Graaf	President of the Senate; 2013–2019	Succeeded by Jan Anthonie Bruijn
Preceded by Mark Harbers	State Secretary for Justice and Security; 2019–2022	Succeeded by Eric van der Burg
