= André Postema =

Dutch politician

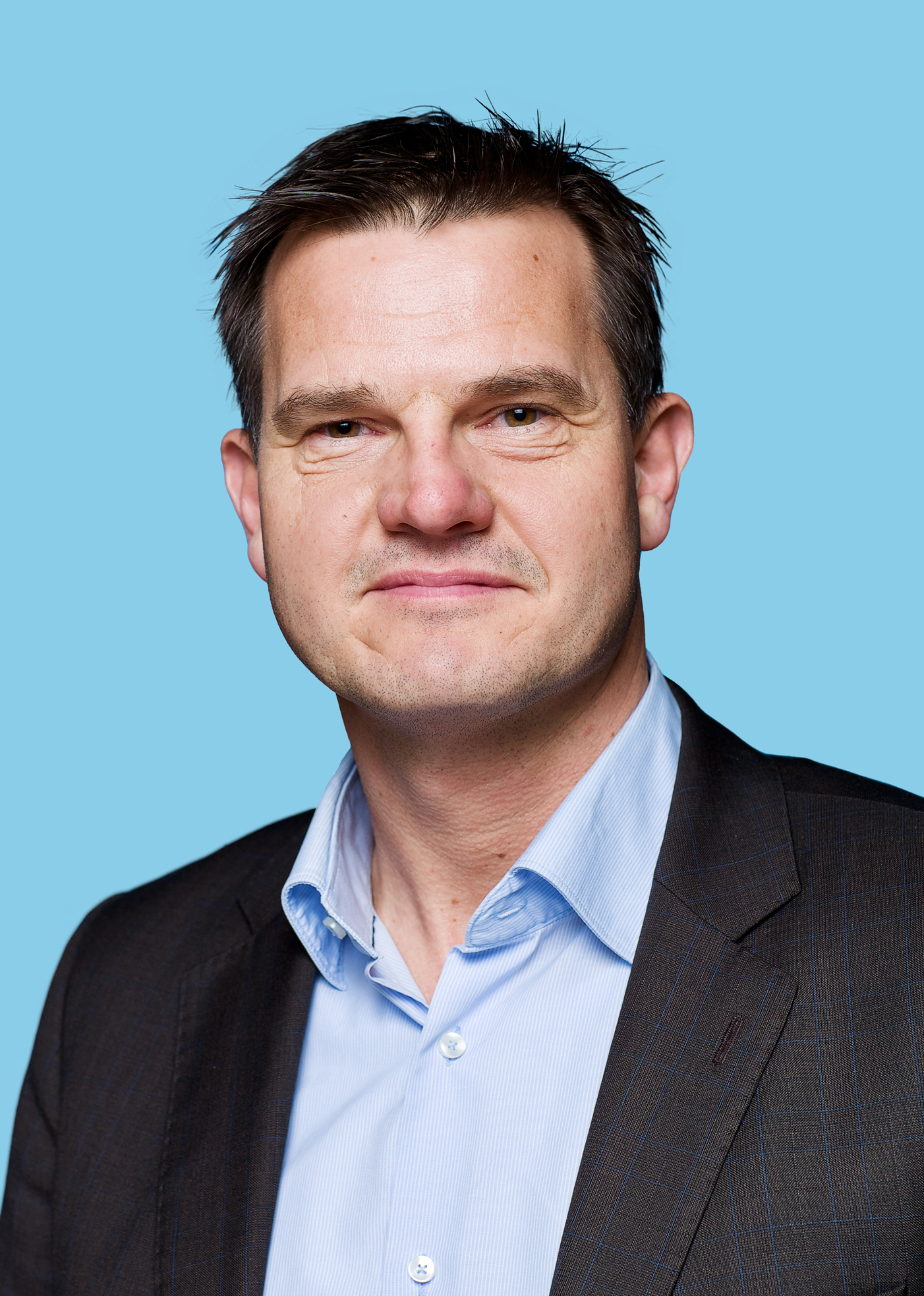
- André Postema in 2015

Labour Party leader in the Senate
- In office 8 February 2018 – 13 February 2018
- Preceded by: Marleen Barth
- Succeeded by: Esther-Mirjam Sent

President of the Benelux Parliament
- Incumbent
- Assumed office 1 January 2017

Member of the Senate
- Incumbent
- Assumed office 7 June 2011

Member of the municipal council of Maastricht
- In office 14 March 2002 – 1 October 2005

Personal details
- Born: 2 November 1969 (age 56) Groningen, Netherlands
- Party: Labour Party (since 1987)

André Postema (Dutch pronunciation: [ˈɑndreː ˈpɔstəmaː]; born 2 November 1969) is a Dutch Labour politician. He has been a member of the Senate since 7 June 2011, President of the Benelux Parliament since 1 January 2017, and in 2018 Labour Party leader in the Senate. He was a member of the municipal council of Maastricht from 2002 to 2005. Since 2014 he is the Chair of the board of LVO, an educational institution of 20 secondary schools in the province of Limburg with 26,000 pupils and 3,000 employees.

Political offices
| Preceded by Maya Detiège | President of the Benelux Parliament; 2017–present | Incumbent |
Party political offices
| Preceded by Marleen Barth | Labour Party leader in the Senate; 2018 | Succeeded by Esther-Mirjam Sent |
