= Tineke Strik =

Dutch politician

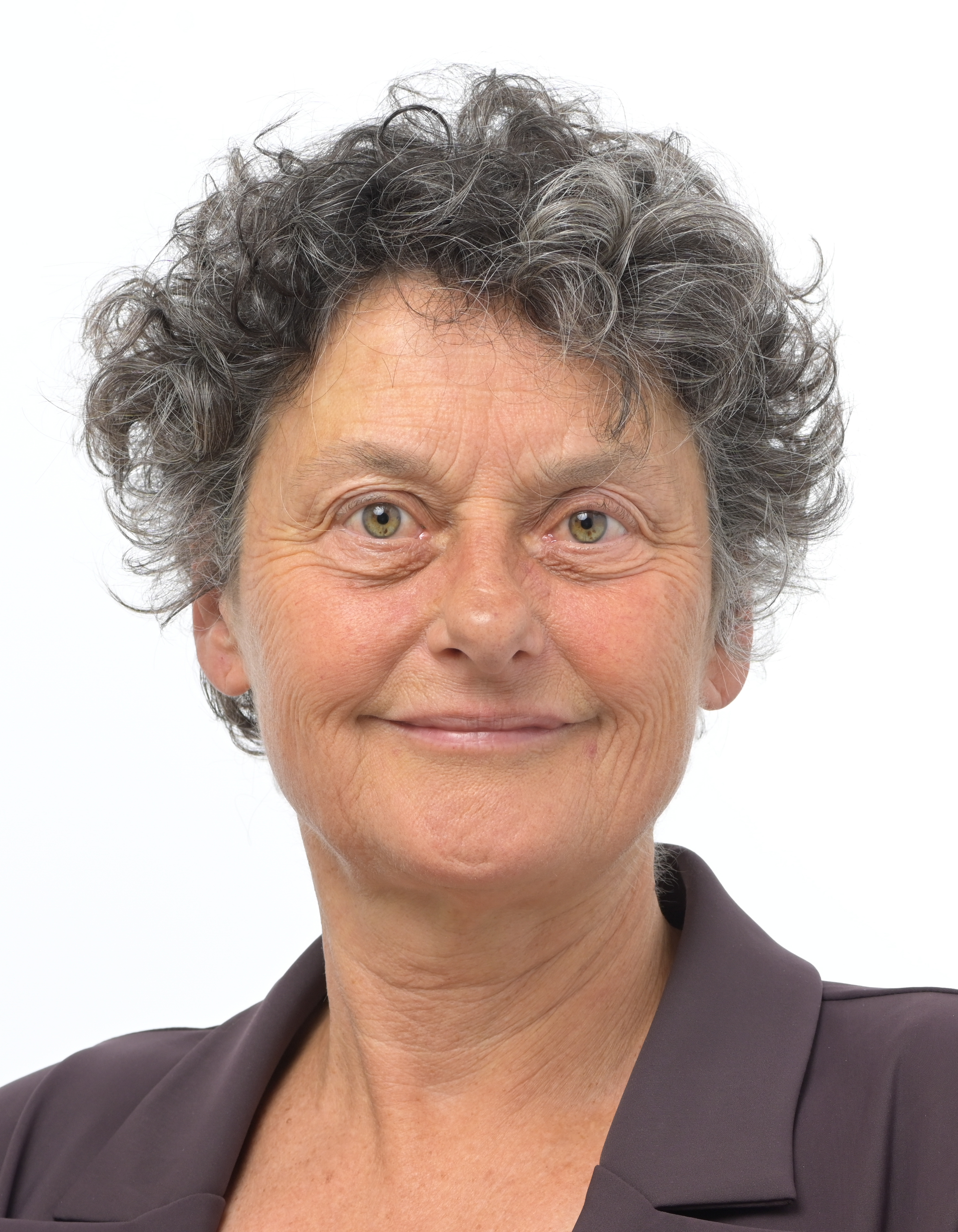
- Tineke Strik in 2024

Member of the European Parliament for the Netherlands
- Incumbent
- Assumed office 2 July 2019

Member of the Senate of the Netherlands
- In office 12 June 2007 – 1 July 2019

Personal details
- Born: Martina Hermina Antonia Strik; 28 September 1961 (age 64) Alphen, Netherlands
- Party: GreenLeft

Martina Hermina Antonia "Tineke" Strik (born 28 September 1961) is a Dutch politician. From 2007 to 2019 she was a member of the Senate for GreenLeft. Since 2019 she is a member of the European Parliament sitting with the Greens–European Free Alliance group.

== Biography ==
Between 1979 and 1983, Strik studied social work at the social academy "Den Elzent" in Eindhoven. In the meanwhile, she worked at the Kindertelefoon, a phone help line for children. Between 1981 and 1985, she worked as a youth worker at the Cultural Youth Centre "De Effenaar" in Eindhoven. She continued to study international law at the Radboud University between 1985 and 1991, she also studied Turkish between 1989 and 1991. Between 1990 and 1993, she worked a legal consultant at the Youth Advice Centre in Amsterdam. Between 1994 and 1995, she briefly studied law at the Radbouw University. She also took courses at the Red Cross, Clingendael, and the University Utrecht where she studied war law, European law and administrative law. Between 1993 and 1996, she worked at Vluchtelingenwerk, an organization that helps refugees, as a legal consultant. She then worked as a judicial secretary at the court of Zwolle, working for the chamber of refugees. In 1997, she made the switch to politics: she began to work for the GreenLeft parliamentary party as a policy advisor on justice. Between 2001 and 2002, she worked as policy coordinator for the Ministry of Justice.

Between 2002 and 2006, she was alderman for social affairs, including youth, culture and minorities in Wageningen. In 2004, she also became researcher-PhD-candidate at the Centre for Migration law of the Radboud University. She had several positions within the GreenLeft. She was member of the Strategic Council, a council of local and national GreenLeft politicians on the party's course. In 2005–2006, she was a member of the committee which wrote GreenLeft's election program. She also was suppleant of the congress of local government of the Council of Europe and observer at the 2005 local elections in the Palestinian National Authority.

In 2007, she was elected into the Senate. In 2008, she announced that she was one of five candidates for the position of top candidate for the GreenLeft in the 2009 European Parliament election, but she did not become a member of that body until 2019. Strik was re-elected in June 2024 as the fifth candidate on the shared GroenLinks–PvdA list, which received a plurality in the Netherlands of eight seats. Her focus has since been on rule of law, democracy, asylum, and migration.

== Personal life ==
Strik was born on a farm in a family of six children in Dodewaard.

== Electoral history ==
Electoral history of Tineke Strik
Year	Body	Party	Pos.	Votes	Result		Ref.
Year	Body	Party	Pos.	Votes	Party seats	Individual	Ref.
2024	European Parliament	GroenLinks–PvdA	5	46,348	8	Won	
