= Jopie Nooren =

Dutch politician

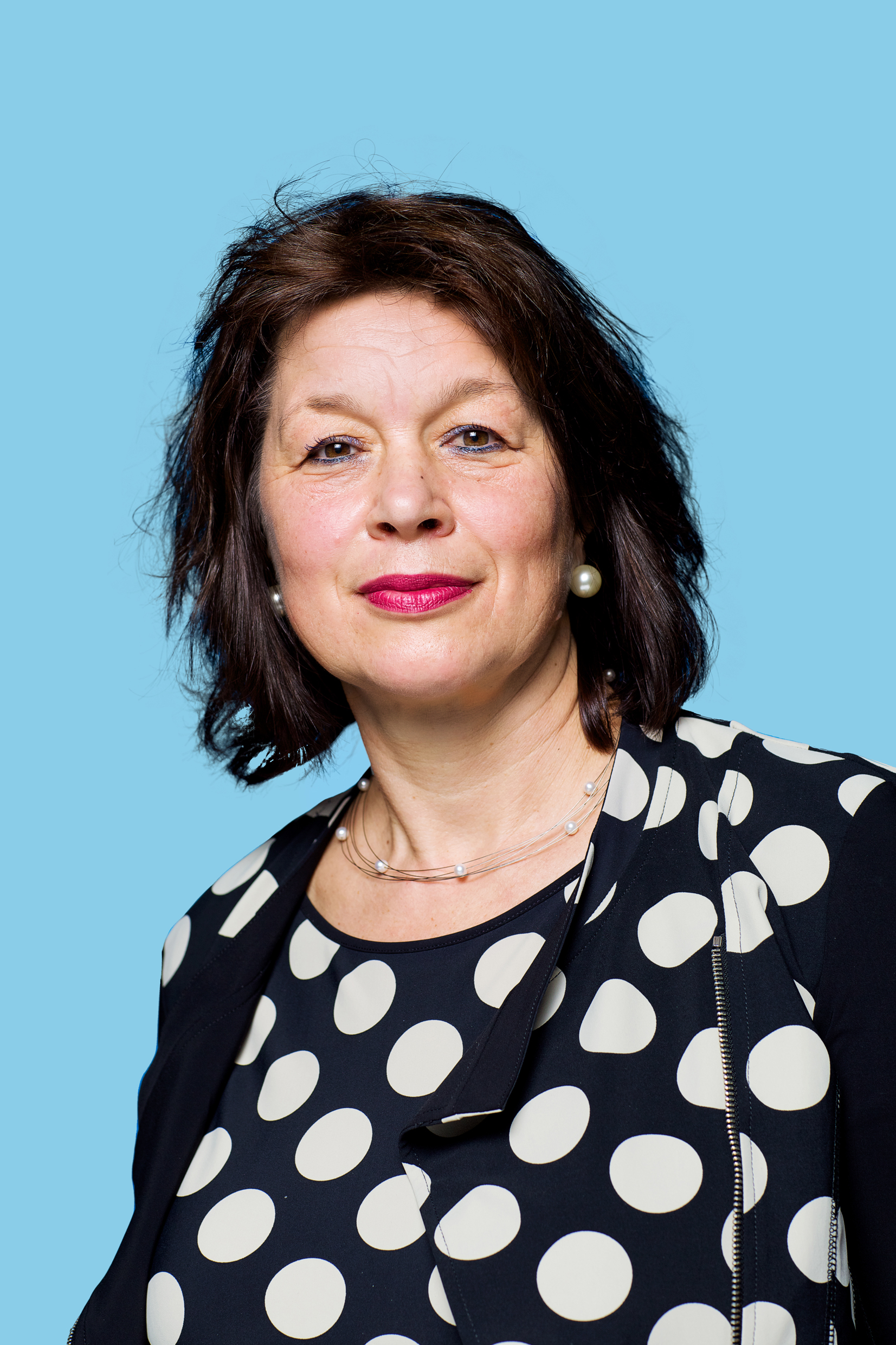
- Jopie Nooren in 2015

Member of the Senate
- In office 9 June 2015 – 1 March 2021

Personal details
- Born: 20 June 1965 (age 60) Breda, Netherlands
- Party: Labour Party

Johanna Elisabeth Anna Maria "Jopie" Nooren (born 25 June 1961) is a Dutch occupational therapist, university professor, and politician. She is a member of the Labour Party and was a member of the Senate between 9 June 2015 and 1 March 2021.

In March 2021 Dr Jopie Nooren was appointed Chair of the Executive Board of the Amsterdam University of Applied Sciences . As Chair, Nooren contributes to the Netherlands Association of Universities of Applied Sciences and national working groups. In January 2025, the Supervisory Board confirmed her role at the Amsterdam University of Applied Sciences for a second, four year term.
