= Tuur Elzinga =

Dutch politician (born 1969)

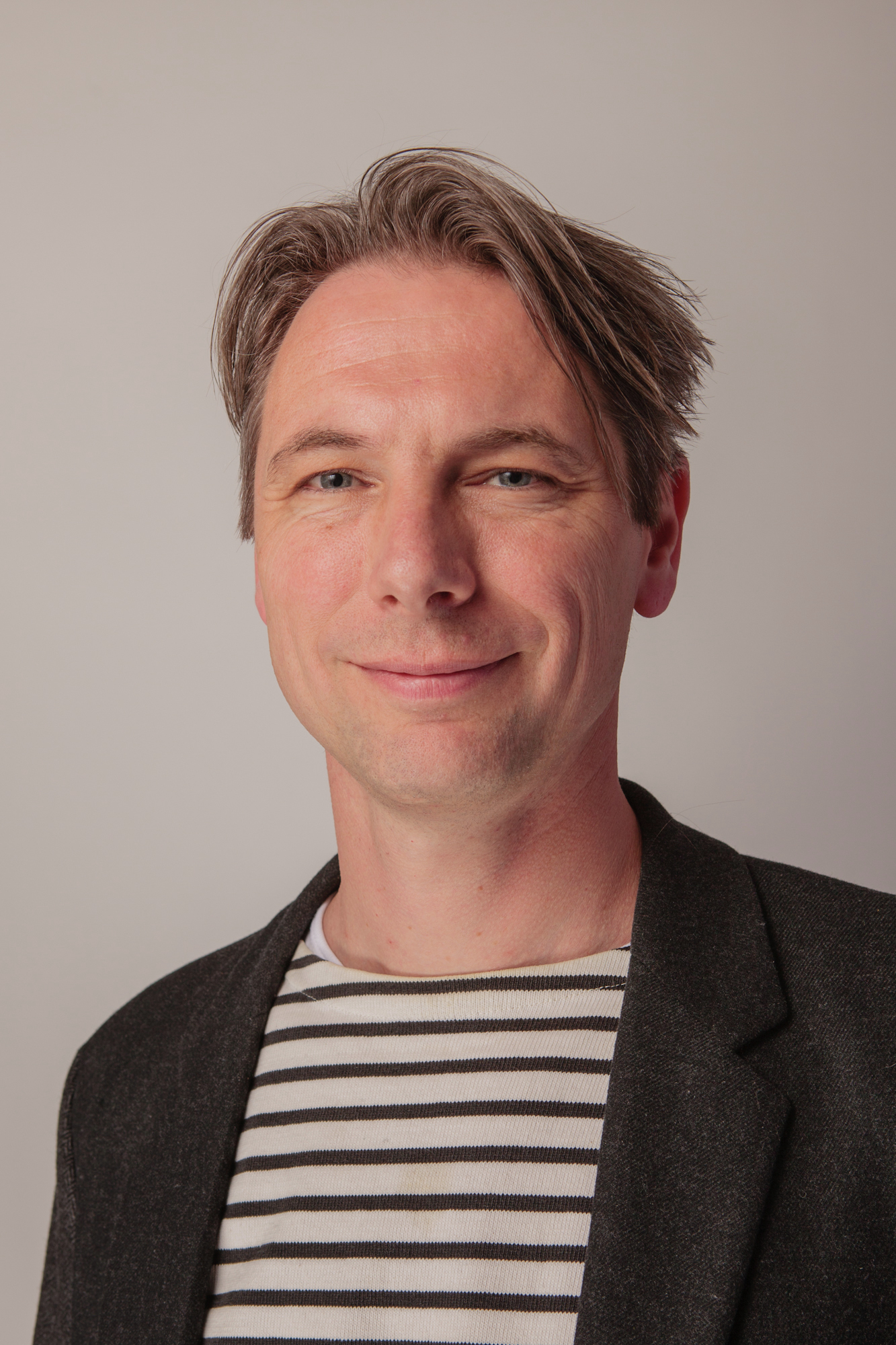

Senate of the Netherlands

Member of the Senate
- In office 12 June 2007 – 1 October 2016

Personal details
- Born: 12 December 1969 (age 56) Den Burg, Texel, Netherlands
- Party: Socialist Party

Arthur (Tuur) Elzinga (12 December 1969) is a Dutch politician and trade unionist. Between 2007 and 2016 he served in the Senate of the Netherlands representing the Socialist Party. Since 2018, he is a vice-president of the trade union confederation FNV with responsibilities for pensions and international affairs.

== Biography ==
Elzinga was born on the island of Texel in December 1969. From 1988 to 1989, he studied physics and astronomy at the University of Amsterdam and began doctoral studies in political science in 1993.

Between 1998 and 2002 he worked as a policy offer for Socialist Party in the parliament.

In 2007 Elzinga was a co-founder of Tax Justice Netherlands (the Dutch branch of ATTAC). He was selected to be sixth on the Socialist Party's ticket for the Senate, winning election in June 2007. He served in the senate until 2016, during which time he was chairman of the standing committee for European Affairs. At this time, he also worked at FNV Mondiaal, focussing on issues related to Zimbabwe and decent work.

From 2017, Elzinga has served as a vice-president of FNV and acts as the Federation's lead negotiator with the government and employers on pensions.
