= 2015 Dutch Senate election =

- 26 May 2015
- All 75 seats in the Senate; 38 seats needed for a majority
- Turnout: 100.0%
| Party | Leader | Vote % | Seats | +/– |
|---|---|---|---|---|
| VVD | Loek Hermans | 16.87 | 13 | −3 |
| CDA | Elco Brinkman | 14.87 | 12 | +1 |
| D66 | Thom de Graaf | 13.01 | 10 | +5 |
| PVV | Marjolein Faber | 11.97 | 9 | −1 |
| SP | Tiny Kox | 11.85 | 9 | +1 |
| PvdA | Marleen Barth | 10.45 | 8 | −6 |
| GL | Tineke Strik | 5.63 | 4 | −1 |
| CU | Roel Kuiper | 4.87 | 3 | +1 |
| PvdD | Niko Koffeman | 3.59 | 2 | +1 |
| SGP | Peter Schalk | 2.72 | 2 | +1 |
| 50+ | Jan Nagel | 2.60 | 2 | +1 |
| OSF | Henk ten Hoeve | 1.57 | 1 | 0 |
This lists parties that won seats. See the complete results below.
| President of the Senate before | President of the Senate after |
|---|---|
| Ankie Broekers-Knol; VVD | Ankie Broekers-Knol; VVD |

Elections of the Dutch Senate were held on 26 May 2015. The elected senators were sworn in on 9 June 2015.

== Electoral system ==
The Senate is elected by the members of the States-Provincial of the country's twelve provinces, who had been directly elected by the citizens two months earlier, in the 2015 provincial elections. The value of a vote is determined by the population of the province in which the voter is a member of the States-Provincial. The seats are distributed in one nationwide constituency using party-list proportional representation.

| Province | Members | Population | Value |
|---|---|---|---|
| South Holland | 55 | 3,600,784 | 655 |
| North Holland | 55 | 2,762,163 | 502 |
| North Brabant | 55 | 2,489,325 | 453 |
| Gelderland | 55 | 2,026,393 | 368 |
| Utrecht | 49 | 1,263,509 | 258 |
| Overijssel | 47 | 1,140,659 | 243 |
| Limburg | 47 | 1,118,054 | 238 |
| Friesland | 43 | 646,324 | 150 |
| Groningen | 43 | 584,104 | 136 |
| Drenthe | 41 | 488,611 | 119 |
| Flevoland | 41 | 401,503 | 98 |
| Zeeland | 39 | 380,717 | 98 |

== Results ==
| Parties | Vote | | Seats | |
| Parties | Votes | Value | Won | +/- |
|---|---|---|---|---|
| People's Party for Freedom and Democracy | 90 | 28,523 | 13 | ▼3 |
| Christian Democratic Appeal | 89 | 25,145 | 12 | ▲1 |
| Democrats 66 | 67 | 21,997 | 10 | ▲5 |
| Party for Freedom | 66 | 20,235 | 9 | ▼1 |
| Socialist Party | 70 | 20,038 | 9 | ▲1 |
| Labour Party | 63 | 17,651 | 8 | ▼6 |
| GroenLinks | 30 | 9,520 | 4 | ▼1 |
| Christian Union | 32 | 8,237 | 3 | ▲1 |
| Party for the Animals | 18 | 6,073 | 2 | ▲1 |
| Reformed Political Party | 17 | 4,597 | 2 | ▲1 |
| 50PLUS | 14 | 4,388 | 2 | ▲1 |
| Independent Senate Group | 14 | 2,652 | 1 | Steady |
| Total | 570 | 169,056 | 75 | Steady |
Source: Kiesraad

== See also ==
- List of candidates in the 2015 Dutch Senate election
