= Fare =

Fee payable to use a public transport service

A fare is the fee paid by a passenger for use of the public transport system: rail, bus, taxi, etc. In the case of air transport, the term airfare is often used. Fare structure is the system set up to determine how much is to be paid by various passengers using a transit vehicle at any given time. A linked trip is a trip from the origin to the destination on the transit system. Even if a passenger must make several transfers during a journey, the trip is counted as one linked trip on the system.

== Uses ==
The fare paid is a contribution to the operational costs of the transport system involved, either partial (as is frequently the case with publicly supported systems) or total. The portion of operating costs covered by fares - the farebox recovery ratio - typically varies from 30%-60% in North America and Europe, with some rail systems in Asia over 100%.

The rules regarding how and when fares are to be paid and for how long they remain valid are many and varied. Where the fare can generally be predicted (such as fixed fare systems) fare is usually collected in advance; this is the usual practice of rail and bus systems, who usually require the payment of fares on or before boarding. In the case of taxis and other vehicles for hire, (where the total fare will not be known until the trip is completed) payment is normally made at the end of the ride. Some systems use a hybrid of both, such as a rail system which requires prepayment of the minimum fare, and collecting amounts above the minimum (if the net cost of the trip exceeds the minimum fare) at the end of the trip.

Some systems allow free transfers: that is to say that a single payment permits travel within a particular geographical zone or time period. Such an arrangement is helpful for people who need to transfer from one route to another in order to reach their destination. Sometimes transfers are valid in one direction only, requiring a new fare to be paid for the return trip.

Penalty fares are fares issued for passengers without valid tickets; standard fare is a term with similar meaning. In the United Kingdom, certain train operating companies, such as South Western Railway and Southern, have revenue protection inspectors who can issue penalty fares to passengers who travel without a valid ticket. As of January 2023, the minimum was £20 or twice the single fare for the journey made. In Canada, the Toronto Transit Commission charges $500 for people evading the $3 fare.

== Types of fare structure ==
Public transportation fares are organized under various kinds of fare structures which price the service based on criteria such as distance traveled, demand for the service, and time of day.

=== Flat fare ===
The simplest fare structure is a flat fee with a fixed price for a given service. For example, the Los Angeles Metro charges $1.75 for a standard single ride on its buses or rail services. A flat fee may be charged for a single ride, or for an unlimited number of rides within a single time period such as 90 minutes, a day or a week.

=== Zone-based fare ===
Zoned-based fare systems charge a traveler a price that depends on the number of geographically determined fare zones that are expected to be traversed in a given trip. Examples include the London Underground ticketing system and the integrated ticketing system of transportation authorities such as the Verkehrsverbund Berlin-Brandenburg or the Autoritat del Transport Metropolità in the Barcelona metro area.

=== Transfer fare ===
Transfer fare systems charge a fare depending on previous trips. Timed transfers and pre-booked combined transfers are examples of that.

=== Distance-based fare ===
Some transportation systems charge a fare based on the distance traveled between the origin and destination stations or stops of a service. Such a system may use an exit fare at the destination station in order to correctly charge the customer based on the distance traveled. Examples include the Beijing Subway and the San Francisco Bay Area's BART system.

=== Subscription fare ===
Certain transportation systems have subscription passes that provide an advantage over paying fares individually.

=== Variable fares ===
Certain services, often long-distance modes such as high-speed trains, will charge a variable fare with a price that depends on complex factors such as how early the ticket is bought or the demand for the service. A prominent example is airline ticketing. Other examples include high-speed rail services such as Eurostar and regional buses such as Megabus.

== Farebox ==
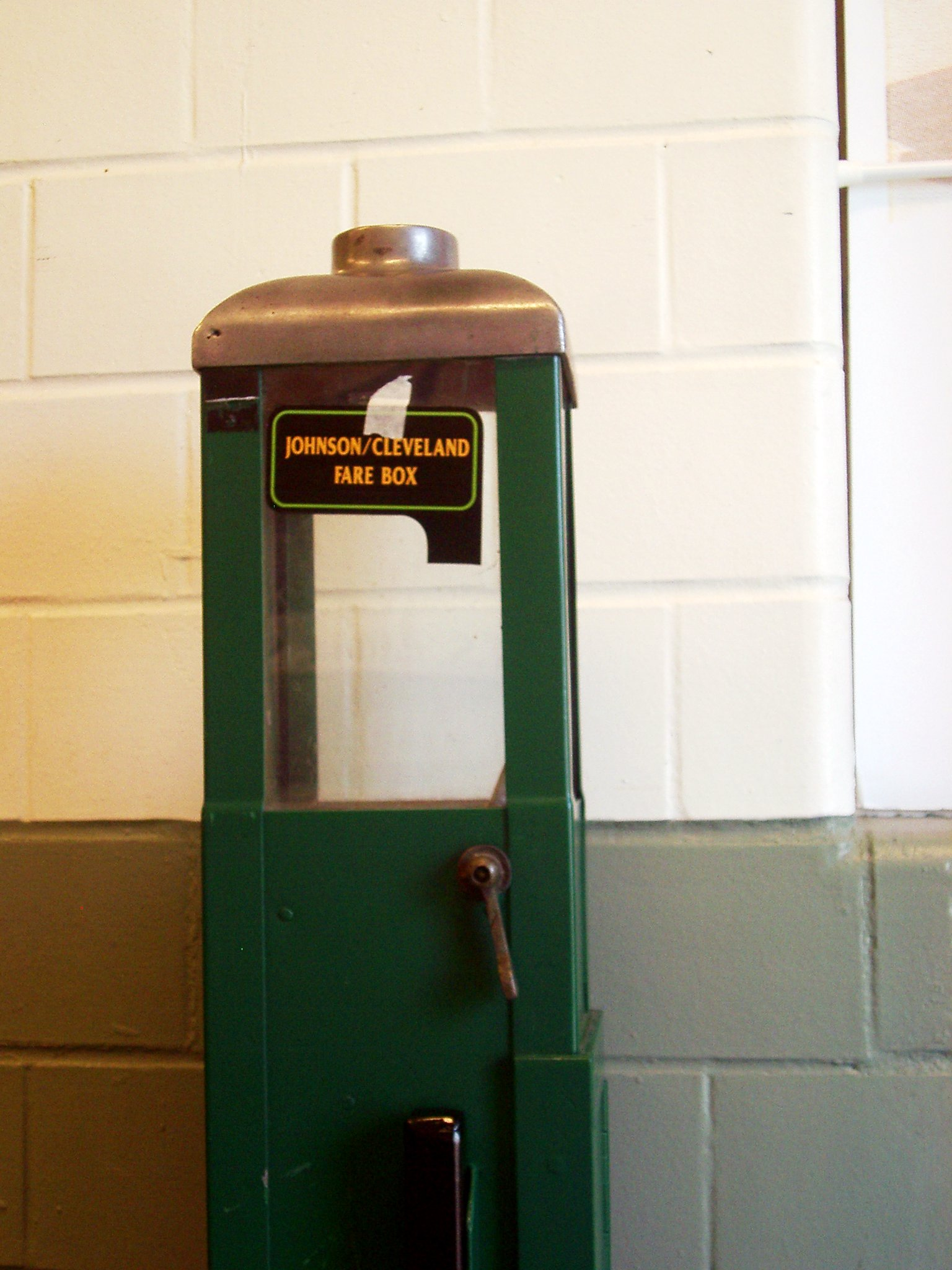
A basic farebox of circa 1950s manufacture

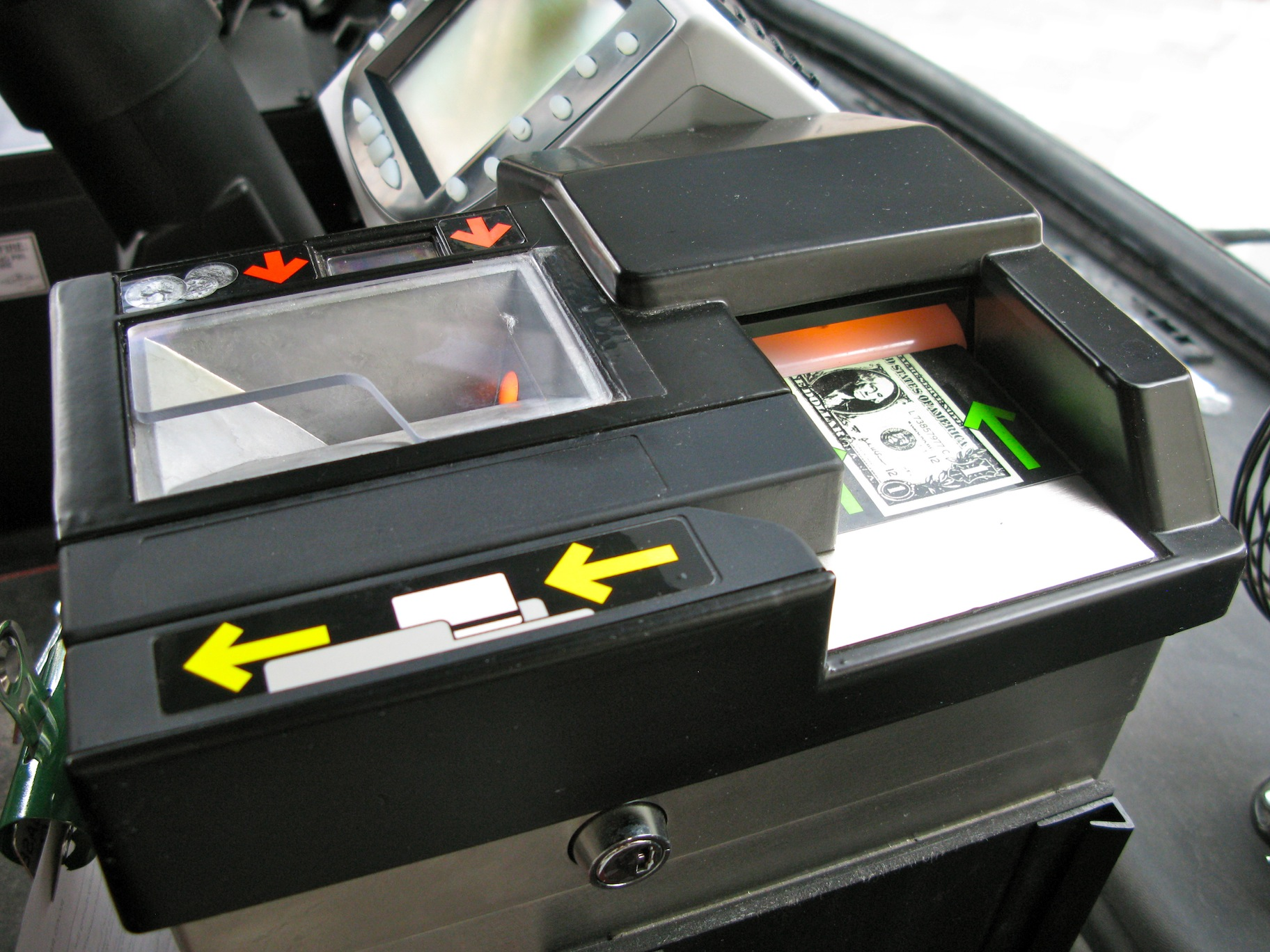
The top of a Genfare CENTSaBILL farebox, introduced in the 1990s

A farebox is a device used to collect fares and tickets on streetcars, trains and buses upon entry, replacing the need for a separate conductor. Nearly all major metropolitan transit agencies in the United States and Canada use a farebox to collect or validate fare payment. The first farebox was invented by Tom Loftin Johnson in 1880 and was used on streetcars built by the St. Louis Car Company. Early models would catch coins and then sort them once the fare was accepted or "rung up". Later models after World War II had a counting function that would allow the fares to be added together so that a total per shift could be maintained by the transit revenue department. In many cases, fareboxes retain the cash in a secure manner with the driver having no access; this increases security as well as reducing employee fraud.

Fareboxes did not change again until around 1984, when fares in many larger cities reached $1.00 and the first dollar-bill-accepting farebox was put into service. In 2006, new fareboxes had the capability of accepting cash, credit, or smartcard transactions, and issuing day passes and transfers for riders.

== See also ==
- Free travel pass
- Manual fare collection
- Proof-of-payment
- Ticket
- Ticket systems on public transport
- Toll bridge
- Toll road
- Train pass
- Train ticket
- Transit pass
- Smart card
- Zero-fare
- Integrated ticketing
