= Ben Swagerman =

Dutch politician

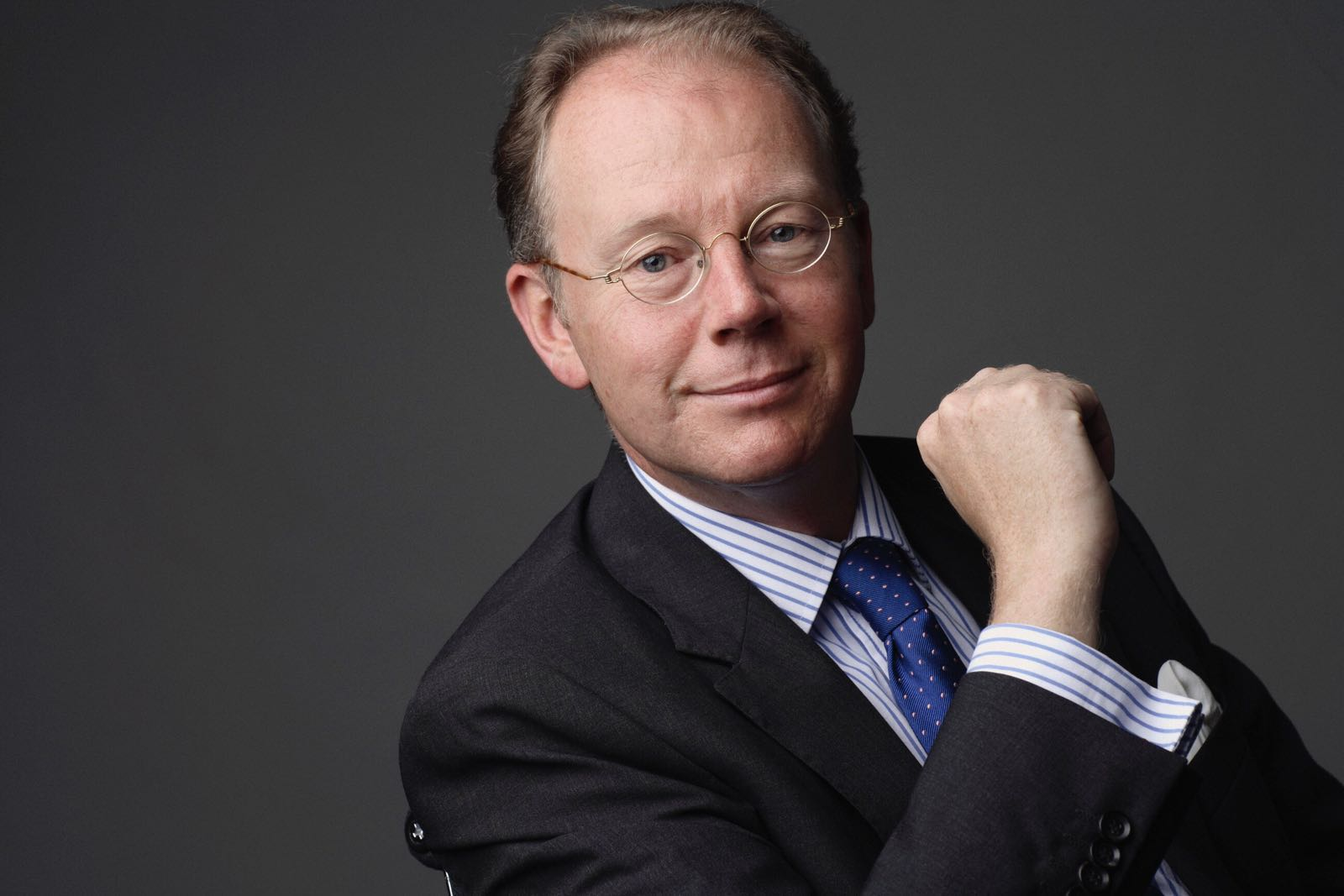

Member of the Senate
- In office 10 November 2015 – 12 July 2016
- In office 7 June 2011 – 9 June 2015

Personal details
- Born: 7 July 1959 (age 67) Zeist, Netherlands
- Party: People's Party for Freedom and Democracy (until 2020)
- Education: Utrecht University

Ben Swagerman (born 7 July 1959) is a Dutch politician and former prosecutor. Swagerman was a member of the Senate for the People's Party for Freedom and Democracy between June 2011 and June 2015 and served once more from November 2015 to July 2016. He has been chair of the BOA-platform since 1 January 2020.

== Career ==
Swagerman was born on 7 July 1959 in Zeist. He went to the Atheneum in his hometown between 1971 and 1977. Swagerman subsequently studied Dutch law at Utrecht University and graduated in 1983.

Swagerman served three years as a lawyer and subsequently studied to become a prosecutor. Starting his prosecutor career as a substitute in The Hague in 1992, he was later employed in the same position in Willemstad (Curaçao) and Amsterdam. After serving as deputy and interim head prosecutor in Amsterdam between December 1998 and June 2001 Swagerman became prosecutor-general of the Netherlands Antilles. He was in function until January 2003. Between 2003 and 2006 Swagerman was head-prosecutor of the police-region Northern Limburg. From February 2006 until July 2016 he worked for the security section of airline KLM. He subsequently became chief legal officer at Qatar Airways, which he remained until early 2019. On 1 January 2020 he became chair of the Buitengewoon opsporingsambtenaar (BOA)-platform, succeeding Pieter Winsemius. In November 2020, as chair of the platform, he argued for more small scale security experiments in which the police, BOA's and civilians cooperate. He also stated that the role of the BOA's has grown during the COVID-19 pandemic in the Netherlands and that cooperation between BOA's and police could be improved significantly.

== Politics ==
In the 2011 Senate elections Swagerman obtained a seat for the People's Party for Freedom and Democracy and took office on 7 June. He completed his term and was not re-elected in the 2015 Senate elections and subsequently left the Senate on 9 June 2015.

In March 2015 Swagerman accused MP's criticizing Security and Justice Minister Ivo Opstelten of "shameless political games". The critique was voiced in a case regarding a financial deal made in 2000 between the prosecutor's office and a criminal. Teeven's State Secretary Fred Teeven had signed the deal as prosecutor. Swagerman signed the deal as interim head prosecutor of Amsterdam. In the Senate Swagerman voted for an againstment which would end the possibility that a person cannot be re-tried after a final verdict of acquittal.

After Loek Hermans resigned from the Senate in early November 2015, Swagerman replaced him on 10 November. Swagermans resigned on 12 July 2016 and was replaced by Tanja Klip-Martin.

On 8 May 2020 Swagermans switched parties to Forum for Democracy and took up a position as advisor. In september of the same year he terminated his membership of FvD
