= Tanja Klip-Martin =

Dutch politician

Member of the Senate
- Incumbent
- Assumed office 12 July 2016

Personal details
- Born: Tanja Martin; 30 March 1954 (age 72) Rotterdam, Netherlands
- Party: VVD
- Children: 3
- Education: Leiden University

Tanja Klip-Martin (born 30 March 1954) is a Dutch art historian, politician, and government official. She is a member of the Dutch Senate for the People's Party for Freedom and Democracy (VVD), having served since 12 July 2016.

== Early life ==
Klip-Martin attended secondary school in Delft from 1966 to 1972. She then began studying art history and archaeology at Leiden University in 1972, graduating cum laude in 1980. After her studies, Klip-Martin worked as a curator at the Noord-Brabants Museum from August 1980 to October 1984 and was subsequently active as a freelance art historian from 1984 to 2002.

On July 1, 2022, Klip-Martin became the owner of WijsBestuur, an organizational consultancy firm. In addition, she has held various other functions.

== Political career ==
Klip-Martin began her political career in Coevorden, where she served as a municipal councilor for the People's Party for Freedom and Democracy (VVD) from January 1998 to April 2002 and as an alderwoman from April 2002 to February 2005, responsible for welfare, education, arts & culture, and sports, among other issues.

From February 2005 to March 2013, Klip-Martin was a member of the provincial executive of Drenthe, where she was responsible for environmental issues, water & water boards, climate & energy, culture, and other issues. She also served as president of the supervisory board of the Waterleidingmaatschappij Drenthe.

From 1 March 2013 to 1 January 2021, Klip-Martin was the dike warden (dijkgraaf) of the Vallei en Veluwe water board. She was initially scheduled to remain in office until 1 August 2020, but due to the COVID-19 pandemic, she remained in office until 1 January 2021. On July 12, 2016, Klip-Martin succeeded Ben Swagerman as a member of the Senate. In the Senate, she served as the VVD's spokesperson on matters including culture, environment and sustainable energy, water, soil, and nitrogen. On January 1, 2025, she succeeded Edith Schippers as leader of the VVD's senate group.

On September 26, 2025, Klip-Martin ran for the presidency of the Senate, the election taking place on October 7 of that same year. The other candidates were Ilona Lagas of the Farmer-Citizen Movement (BBB) and Mei Li Vos of GroenLinks-PvdA. Vos was elected by 39 out of 75 members present, with 3 blank votes.

== Personal life ==
Klip-Martin is married and has three sons.
