= Penalty fare =

Penalty for not paying normal ticket fare

A penalty fare, standard fare, or fixed penalty notice is a special, usually higher, fare charged because a passenger using public transport did not comply with the normal ticket purchasing rules. It should not be confused with an unpaid fares notice.

Penalty fares are incurred when a ticket or a rail pass cannot be produced on request. If, for example a mobile device is inoperative and the ticket cannot be displayed a penalty fare can be issued.

Contrary to popular belief, penalty fares cannot solely be avoided if tickets are purchased before commencing the journey; the offence under the (British) Railway Byelaws has nothing to do with purchase of tickets, it consists solely in the failure to produce a ticket and, where necessary a rail pass, at the time of request. Evidence of ticket purchase other than the ticket itself, is not relevant to the offence.

Penalty fares are a civil debt, not a fine, and a person whose penalty fare is paid is not considered to have committed a criminal offence. Penalty fares are used to discourage casual fare evasion and disregard for the ticketing rules without resorting to (in the case of railways in Great Britain) the drastic and costly step of prosecution under the Regulation of Railways Act 1889 or other laws dealing with theft and fraud. More egregious fare avoiders can still be prosecuted and fined or imprisoned if convicted.

== Situation by country ==
=== United Kingdom ===
==== National Rail services in Great Britain ====
===== History and legal status =====
British Railways (Penalty Fares) Act 1989
- Act of Parliament
- Parliament of the United Kingdom
- Long title: An Act to empower the charging of a penalty fare for persons using passenger transport services under the control of the British Railways Board without a valid ticket for such use; and for related purposes.
- Citation: 1989 c. xvii

Dates
- Royal assent: 16 November 1989

Text of statute as originally enacted

Railways (Penalty Fares) Regulations 2018
- Statutory Instrument
- Parliament of the United Kingdom
- Citation: SI 2018/366

Dates
- Made: 12 March 2018
- Laid before Parliament: 15 March 2018
- Commencement: 6 April 2018
Other legislation
Made under	Railways Act 1993
Amended by	Railways (Penalty Fares) (Amendment) Regulations 2022

Text of statute as originally enacted

Penalty fares were first introduced on British Rail's Network SouthEast services under the British Rail (Penalty Fares) Act 1989 (c. xvii). Over time they have been extended to cover many parts of the National Rail network. Initially the penalty fare was set at £10 or twice the full single fare to the next station (whichever was higher) in addition to the full single fare for the rest of the journey. In respect of England the amount is £100 plus the full single fare applicable, reduced to £50 plus that fare if paid before the end of the period of 21 days beginning with the day after the penalty fare was charged; no account is taken of time spent on appeal in calculating that period. Those amounts were substituted for England by the Railways (Penalty Fares) (Amendment) Regulations 2022 with effect from 23 January 2023; in Wales the amount remains £20 or twice the full single fare applicable, whichever is greater.

Penalty fares on the National Rail network are authorised by section 130 of the Railways Act 1993 and are governed by the Railways (Penalty Fares) Regulations 2018, which came into force on 6 April 2018 and revoked the Railways (Penalty Fares) Regulations 1994 and the Penalty Fares Rules made under them. The Regulations do not apply to services provided under a Scottish franchise agreement, to Scotland-only services, or to services provided by Transport for London or its subsidiaries. A penalty fare may be charged whether or not the passenger intended to travel without paying.

Railways (Penalty Fares) (Amendment) Regulations 2022
- Statutory Instrument
- Parliament of the United Kingdom
- Citation: SI 2022/1094

Dates
- Made: 25 October 2022
- Laid before Parliament: 26 October 2022
- Commencement: 23 January 2023
Other legislation
Amends	Railways (Penalty Fares) Regulations 2018
Made under	Railways Act 1993

Text of statute as originally enacted

From January 2023, following a public consultation, the Department for Transport increased the penalty fare to £100 in England plus the cost of the unpaid ticket, under the Railways (Penalty Fares) (Amendment) Regulations 2022 (SI 2022/1094). This is reduced to £50 plus the cost of the ticket if paid within 21 days.

===== Operation =====
Penalty fares can only be issued by authorised collectors, commonly known as revenue protection inspectors (RPIs), either on the train or at the destination station. Some RPIs receive commission on each penalty issued. RPIs are different from regular train conductors, who cannot issue penalty fares. Passengers unable to pay the fare on the spot are allowed to pay within 21 days.

Where a collector proposes to charge a penalty fare, the passenger must give their name and address, and in England their date of birth, when required to do so; failing to do so is an offence punishable on summary conviction by a fine not exceeding level 2 on the standard scale. The date-of-birth requirement was added for England with effect from 23 January 2023.

Penalty fares cannot be issued in some circumstances, including: if passengers were unable to purchase a ticket due to faulty ticket machines or closed ticket offices, if warning notices are not displayed correctly, if the train or station is excluded from a penalty fares scheme, or if the National Rail Conditions of Carriage allow an excess fare to be paid.

RPIs can use their discretion not to give penalty fares to passengers who may have greater difficulty in purchasing tickets e.g. elderly, disabled or pregnant passengers, those with learning difficulties, or those who do not understand English.

Penalty Fares are only operated by certain Train Operating Companies (TOCs), these include C2C, Chiltern Railways, East Midlands Railway, Govia Thameslink Railway (including Southern, Gatwick Express, Thameslink and Great Northern), Greater Anglia, Great Western Railway, Merseyrail, Northern, Southeastern, South Western Railway, TransPennine Express(Excluding Scotland), Transport for Wales (Between Shrewsbury and Birmingham and Carmarthen and Severn Tunnel Junction only) and West Midlands Trains (includes London Northwestern Railway and West Midlands Trains)

===== Appeals =====
An operator may not charge penalty fares at all unless it has arranged for an Appeal Panel and a Final Appeal Panel to hear appeals against them and has agreed to meet the cost of those appeals; a penalty fare charged when the operator does not satisfy those requirements is not payable. A body may act as an Appeal Panel only if it is managerially and organisationally independent of any operator and of any affiliate of an operator, and a Final Appeal Panel must in addition be independent of the panels that heard the earlier stages.

There are three stages. A first-stage appeal must reach the Appeal Panel within 21 days of the day after the penalty fare was charged; a second-stage appeal within 14 days of receiving the first decision; and a final-stage appeal to the Final Appeal Panel within 14 days of receiving the second. Appeals must be made in writing, and a panel must decide within 21 days of receiving one.

The grounds of appeal are exhaustive: that the penalty fare was not charged in accordance with the Regulations; that the appellant is not the person liable to pay it; that the appellant holds a season ticket valid for the journey but did not have it at the time; or that there are compelling reasons why the appellant should not be liable in the particular circumstances. A panel that finds a ground made out must allow the appeal, and one that does not must refuse it; there is no general discretion. Where the appellant makes representations about certain factual matters – which train they were on, where they boarded and intended to alight, and whether the exceptions in the Regulations applied – it is for the operator to provide evidence reasonably demonstrating that the appellant's account is untrue.

If a panel allows an appeal, or fails to decide within its 21 days, the appellant is not liable to pay the penalty fare, and any amount already paid must be refunded within ten working days. For penalty fares charged at the England rates, however, the appellant remains liable for the full single fare for the journey.

Lodging a first-stage appeal also restricts prosecution: proceedings for the offences listed in the Regulations – including those under section 5(3)(a) and (b) of the Regulation of Railways Act 1889, the railway byelaws, and in England section 11 of the Fraud Act 2006 – may then be brought for the same failure to produce a ticket only if the operator cancels the penalty fare before the panel decides or its time expires.

Appeals are administered for the train operators by two companies: Penalty Services Ltd, which hears appeals for operators including East Midlands Railway, Govia Thameslink Railway, Merseyrail, Northern, Southeastern, TransPennine Express, Transport for Wales, South Western Railway and the Tyne and Wear Metro, and the Appeal Service, operated by ITAL Group Limited, which also trades as the payment and collection service IRCAS. A passenger dissatisfied with the handling of an appeal may raise it with Transport Focus or London TravelWatch, neither of which can overturn the decision.

A notice headed "Unpaid Fare Notice" is not a penalty fare and is not issued under the Regulations at all: it is a contractual notice raised under the operator's own conditions of carriage, so the exhaustive grounds, the independent panels, the reversed burden of proof and the time limits described above do not apply to it, and the statutory appeal route is not open to the person who receives one.

===== Compulsory ticket areas =====
Some penalty fares schemes include stations with compulsory ticket areas (CTAs), in which people without valid tickets or other authorities may be charged a penalty fare even if they have not travelled and if they do not intend to travel. These include Amersham, Aylesbury, Beaconsfield, Birmingham Moor Street, Birmingham Snow Hill, Chalfont and Latimer, Chorleywood, Derby, Ealing Broadway, Gerrards Cross, Greenford TfL station, Harrow on the Hill, High Wycombe, Leicester, London Marylebone, London St Pancras, Maidenhead, Nottingham, Rickmansworth, Sheffield, South Ruislip

==== Transport For London services ====
The London Regional Transport (Penalty Fares) Act 1992 and the Greater London Authority Act 1999 allows Transport for London to charge penalty fares under similar but not identical rules to those on National Rail services.

Initially, the maximum penalty fare was set at £10 (£5 on buses and trams) or twice the full single fare to the next station (whichever is higher) in addition to the full single fare for the rest of the journey. It was later raised to £20 for all transport modes.

On 11 January 2009, it was further raised to £50 on TfL services (Docklands Light Railway, the Emirates Air Line, London Buses, Tramlink, London Overground and London Underground) although like many other civil penalties in the UK, a 50% discount is applied for early payments (within 21 days). On 2 January 2012, all TfL modes have had a penalty fare of £80. From 4 March 2024, the penalty fare for all TfL services was raised from £80 to £100.

==== Light rail systems ====
In addition to the London services mentioned above, penalty fares apply on several other tram and metro systems in Great Britain, including the Midland Metro, Nottingham Express Transit (NET), and the Tyne and Wear Metro (NEXUS). NET have confirmed that their penalty fares are authorised by byelaws.

Variations on the penalty fare are used by the Manchester Metrolink, which it calls a "standard fare", and by Edinburgh Trams, which calls it an "on-board fare".

==== Northern Ireland ====
Penalty Fares on buses and trains in Northern Ireland are applied in accordance with regulations made under the Transport Act (Northern Ireland) 1967.

==== Scotland ====
Scotland has its own legal system, and train services are overseen by a separate government body (Transport Scotland).

ScotRail, the franchise that operates most of the trains in Scotland, does not issue penalty fares. ScotRail may collect details and send a bill for a ticket, plus an administration fee, but it rarely does so. Ticket inspectors are found on most trains, and passengers travelling without a ticket are expected to buy a ticket on the train.

If a passenger had the opportunity to buy a ticket before they boarded the train (the station had a ticket machine or open ticket office), ScotRail's policy is that the passenger must buy a full-priced single ticket for their journey and not buy cheaper tickets such as cheap-day returns, senior citizen's tickets or use a Railcard to get a discount.

However, Scotland has many unstaffed train stations that do not have ticket machines or with ticket offices sometimes closed. Then, the full range of tickets is available on the train.

In England and Wales, holding an expired season ticket counts as travelling without a ticket, and passengers are liable to penalty fares or prosecution. In Scotland, passengers can renew weekly season tickets on the train. Monthly or annual season tickets are available only from staffed stations.

=== Republic of Ireland ===
Iarnród Éireann (Irish Rail) issues fixed payment notices on Dublin Area Rapid Transit (DART), Commuter light rail, and InterCity services, per the Railway Safety Act 2005 (Fixed Payment Notice) Regulations 2006. Appeals must be made within 21 days and failure to pay may lead to a criminal conviction and a fine of up to €1,000 plus the cost of the unpaid fare. In 2014, fixed penalty notices were issued to 9,885 fare evaders, of which 356 were prosecuted in the District Court.

The Luas tram service issues standard fares of €45 if paid within 14 days or €100 if paid after 14 days but before 28 days. This is regulated under Bye-Law 4 of the Light Railway (Regulation of Travel and Use) Bye-Laws 2015 S.I. No. 322 of 2015. Dublin Bus operates a similar standard fare penalty system, where a €100 penalty is reduced to €50 if paid within 21 days.

=== Czech Republic ===
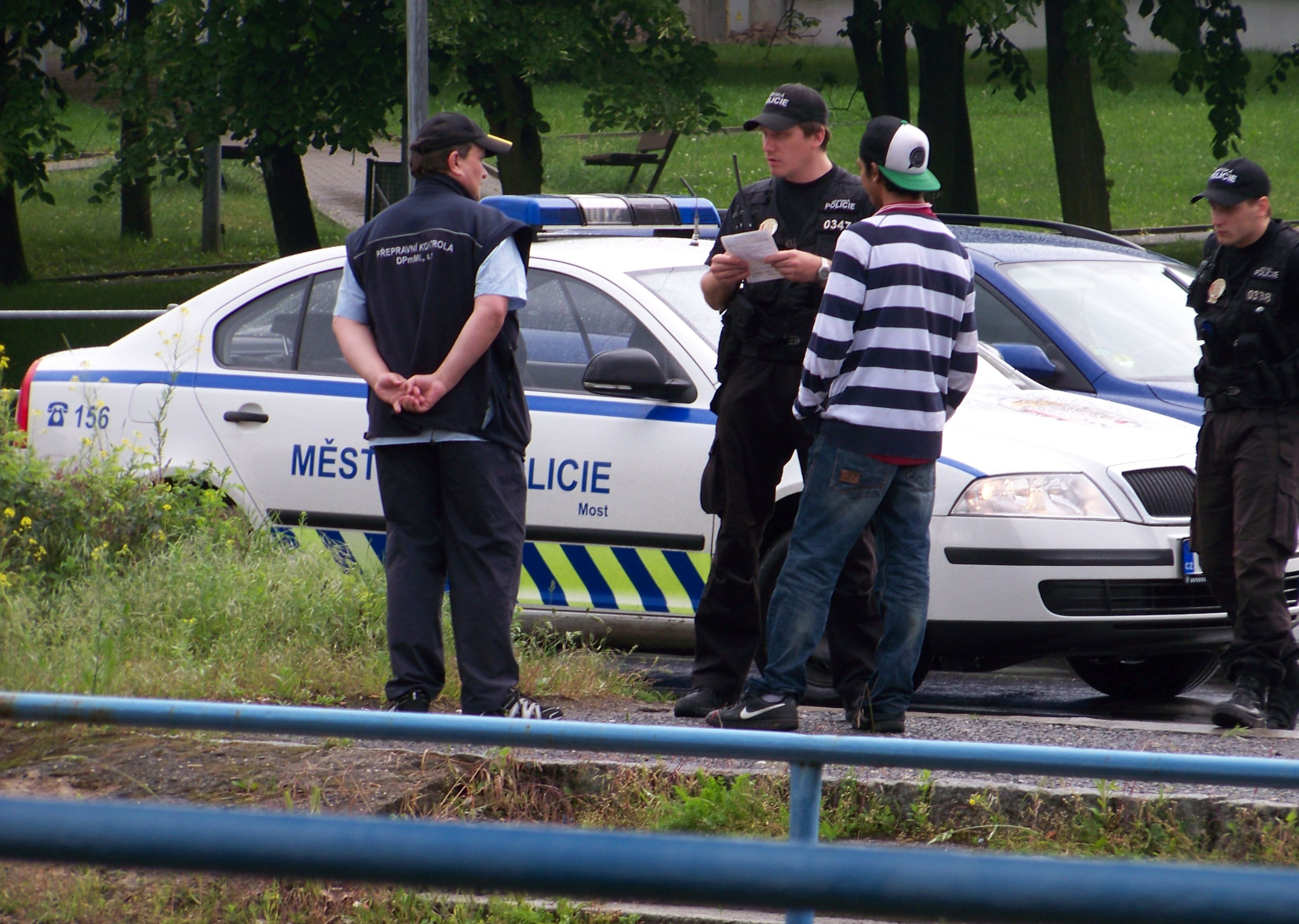
A uniformed ticket inspector with municipal police officers and a fare-dodger in the city of Most

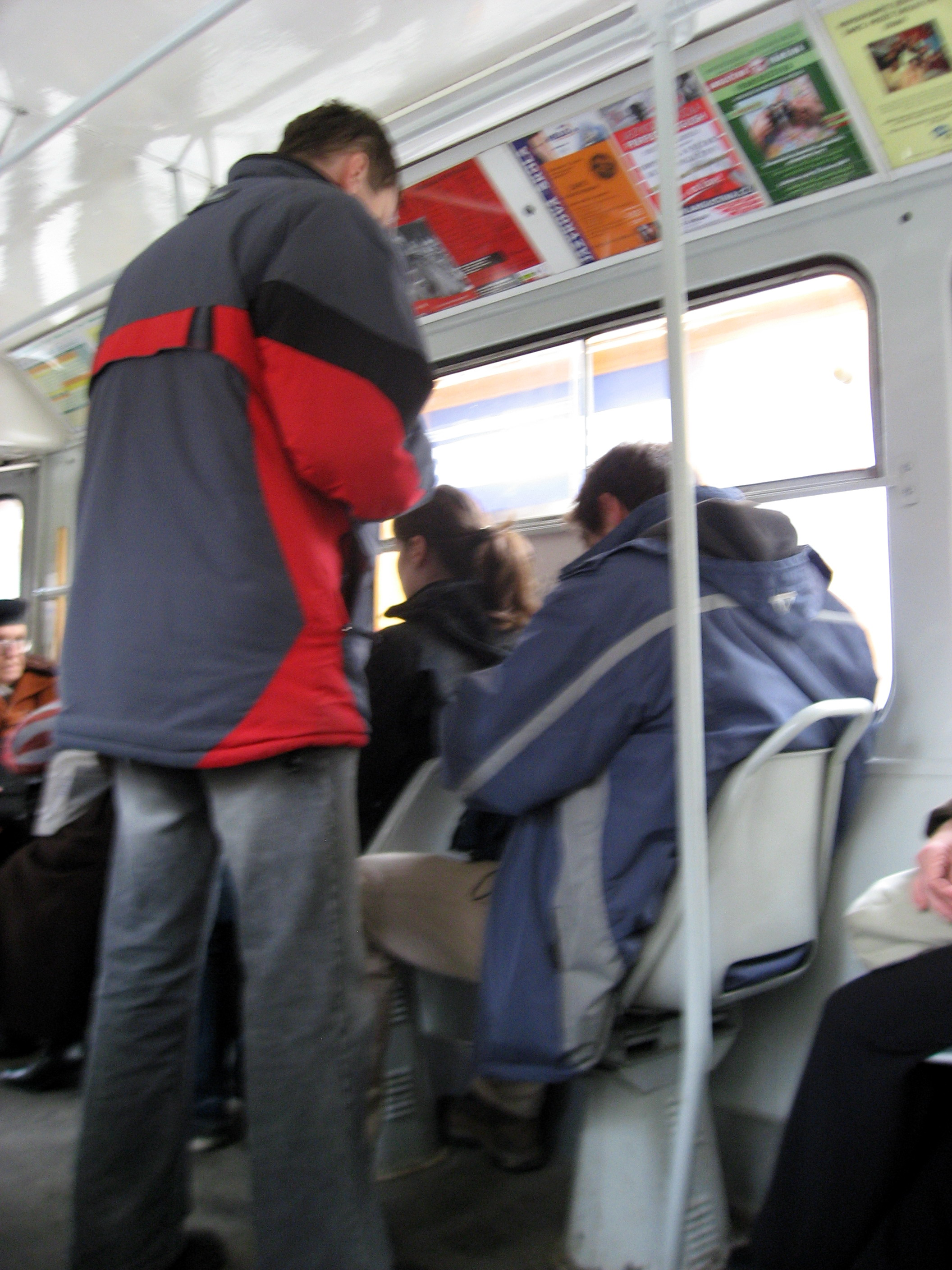
A ticket inspector in informal clothing in a tram in Brno

In the Czech Republic, a penalty limit (maximum penalty) is stated by legislation: parallelly by the Road Transport Act (§ 18a of 111/1994 Sb.) for buses and by Rail Transport Act (§ 37 of 266/1994 Sb.) for trains, trams, trolleybuses and cableways (including aerial lifts). However, the wording of both these acts is co-ordinated. Penalty amount needs to be determined by the specific operator of the transport line or transport system in his Contractual Transport Conditions. The penalty is of private-law nature. To be not confused with public sanctions, they are called "surcharge" in legislation. River transport doesn't fall under this legal regulation, but the contractual terms are set similarly if the ferry or river line is integrated with other public transport.

Since 1 May 2013, the maximum penalty was heightened from 1000 CZK to 1500 CZK. Main operators of urban transport usually use the maximum penalty as the basic variant, although a bit belatedly. E.g. in the Prague Integrated Transport, the penalty was heightened from 1000 CZK to 1500 CZK since 1 January 2014, in the city of Ústí nad Labem since 1 January 2016, in the city of Hradec Králové since 1 January 2017 etc.

Usually, operators offer a penalty reduction for passengers:

- who pay the fine immediately during the inspection (usually about 30−60 percent reduction)
- who have forgotten their long-term ticket or pay card at home and subsequently prove that they have purchased the fare before the inspection (e.g. in Prague, such passengers pay only a symbolic penalty 50 CZK instead of full 1500 CZK).

Since 23 October 2017, Prague announced a special 50 percent penalty discount for such fare dodgers who will additionally purchase an all-year network ticket, and the action continues for 2018 and in January 2019, this measure has become permanent. The price of the all-year network ticket is very favourable, 3650 CZK (= 10 CZK per day).

České dráhy as the main operator of railway passenger transport have the maximum penalty set to 1000 CZK, but it is reduced to 400 CZK if it is paid immediately. However, if the passenger preannounces to the conductor that he does not have a ticket, only 40 CZK handling surcharge applies. That is why the full penalty is very rarely applied. If the passenger has boarded at a stop where the ticket office is not open, the ticket can be purchased by the conductor without any surcharge.

If the penalty is not paid immediately, the passenger is required to produce valid identification documents. If such identification is not provided, the conductor is instructed to contact the police for assistance.

=== Germany ===
Penalty fare ("erhöhtes Beförderungsentgelt") schemes in local transport (suburban rail, buses, underground trains) are administered by local transport authorities (Verkehrsverbund). The penalty fare is usually €60 or twice the ticket price (whichever is higher).

Germany's principal InterCity TOC, DB Fernverkehr, introduced a penalty fare scheme in 2022. Historically, it was possible to buy tickets after boarding with a €17 surcharge. Since the beginning of 2022, passengers who boarded without a ticket will instead receive a penalty fare of twice the ticket price—with a minimum of €60.

=== Philippines ===
The penalty fare for passengers without lacking or holding invalid tickets on the Philippine National Railways' Metro Commuter Line is the maximum fare (PHP 30.00 in the Manila-Alabang route and PHP 60.00 in the Manila-Calamba route).

=== Hong Kong ===
According to the "Conditions of Issue of Tickets" of the MTR, passengers traveling without a ticket in paid areas of MTR, are subject to a HK$500 surcharge. This includes those traveling in First Class carriages on the East Rail line without a First Class single-journey ticket or validated Octopus card.

=== Hungary ===
The penalty fare on the Budapest Metro is set at 25,000 forint (12,000 if paid on the spot).

=== Russia ===
In the Moscow Oblast, the penalty fare is 1,000 rubles. On railways, the penalty fare will be increased to fifty times the 10 km fare, plus the fare from the previous station to named station.

=== Switzerland ===
Switzerland operates a similar system to Germany. Long-distance trains have a ticket inspector on board who checks all tickets. The purchase of tickets on board was no longer possible after 10 December 2011. Local trains within a Tarifverbunde (local zone fare systems) use penalty fares with random checks. For example, in North-West Switzerland the penalty fare is CHF 100, but the monthly season costs CHF 75. Even with relatively infrequent ticket checks there is a financial incentive to remain legal.

=== Sweden ===
The Stockholm Metro operates a penalty fare scheme for passengers that do not have a valid paper ticket, e-ticket or validated smart and contactless cards. The penalty fare is 1500 SEK on top of the appropriate fare for that journey, which is 39 SEK or 26 SEK for concessions, and must be paid within 10 days. There is a right of appeal to ISS.

=== Australia ===
Five states run train networks: New South Wales, Victoria, Queensland, Western Australia and South Australia, and all have different penalty fares.

In New South Wales, the penalty for travelling without a valid ticket is $200, with the maximum penalty being $550.

In Victoria, passengers intercepted by authorised officers without a valid ticket are given the option of having their name and address taken and having the circumstances of their offence documented which may result in a $217 fine being mailed to their address. Passengers also have the option of purchasing a $75 on-the-spot penalty fare with their credit card or debit card, which cannot be appealed. This means destitute people pay multiple times the penalty than a multi-millionaire, should they not have the means to pay instantly.

In Queensland, the penalty for travelling without a valid ticket is $227.

In Western Australia, the on-the-spot penalty fare cost is $100.

In South Australia, the penalty for travelling without a valid ticket is $220.

=== Taiwan ===
In intercity railways, i.e. Taiwan Railway and Taiwan High Speed Rail, anyone who is caught fare evading can be charged the full fare plus an extra 50% penalty fare.

In urban rail transit systems, if caught fare evading, the penalty fare will be 50 times the normal ticket fare.

=== United States ===
In the New York metropolitan area, tickets sold on board the Long Island Rail Road, Metro-North Railroad, and NJ Transit trains, carry a surcharge. This is not described as a penalty, simply a more expensive purchase option. Some stations along these commuter lines do not have ticketing facilities in the waiting area, and passengers pay the standard fare when they purchase a ticket from a conductor.

Metra offers onboard ticket sales by conductors, but will assess a $5 penalty (along with additional costs) for traveling past the travel zone of a particular ticket, and also adds a $5 charge for any passenger buying a ticket on board, who boarded at a station with a ticket vending machine or ticket agent on duty.

Amtrak conductors can sell tickets to customers who do not have a ticket, but there is a surcharge if the train was boarded at a station that was open and able to sell tickets.

On most local bus and rail systems, failure to purchase a ticket in advance is considered "fare evasion" which can result in a citation with a fine ranging from $100 to $500 depending on the jurisdiction. On systems relying on the proof-of-payment honor system, inspectors will randomly check for passengers not purchasing tickets. Otherwise more serious penalties may apply for jumping turnstiles or otherwise evading fare collection systems.

=== The Netherlands ===
In The Netherlands, rules concerning penalty fares can be found in the Passenger Transport Act 2000 (Wet personenvervoer 2000, Wp 2000), the Decree on Passenger Transport 2000 (Besluit personenvervoer 2000, Bp 2000) and the Ministerial Regulation on the Amounts Referred to in Article 48(2) and (6) of the Passenger Transport Decree 2000 (Vaststelling bedragen, bedoeld in artikel 48, tweede en zesde lid, Besluit personenvervoer 2000).

==== Enforcement ====
The enforcement of the laws mentioned above are in the hands of Special Investigations Officers (Buitengewoon Opsporingsambtenaren, BOA's) employed by the public transport companies themself. The SIOs can be equipped with handcuffs and, in the field of public transportation, hold authorities akin to a police officer. The maximum number of SIOs a public transport company may employ is regulated by the Ministry of Justice and Security. The national train operator of The Netherlands, the NS, is allowed to employ 1,200 SIOs.

Besides SIOs, public transport companies can also employ conductors who are not a SIO. Conductors can act against fare evasion and draf a report. They, however, lack the authority and the means to use force. Conductors therefore rely on the cooperation of the fare evader involved. If the fare evader refuses cooperation, the conductor has to call in assistance from SIOs.

==== Fines and criminal prosecution ====
Both using a means of public transportation (e.g. train, metro, tram, bus, etc.) as well as using facilities related to public transport (e.g. being on a railway platform), without a valid ticket constitute a criminal offense. Bothe are misdemeanors. The maximum penalties that could be imposed for fare evasion are two months jail and/or a fine of the 2nd category (per 2025: €5,150) and/or community service of maximum 240 hours.

Criminal prosecution is therefore an option in The Netherlands to sanction fare evasion. However, the Passenger Transport Act 2000, in conjunction with the Decree on Passenger Transport 2000, include a way to escape criminal prosecution. The passenger, in such a case, has to pay the evaded fare and a surcharge of €70 (per 1 October 2025). This sum must either be paid right away or a 'deferment of payment' (Uitstel van Betaling, UvB) will be sent to one's home address. In case of the latter, one must be able to present a photo ID and the sum must be paid within two weeks. If the sum isn't paid in two weeks, an increase of €20 will be applied. Many Dutch people call the surcharge a 'fine' (Boete in Dutch), however it is not for the Criminal Code. Therefore, by paying the surcharge one does not incur a criminal record.

If the 'deferment of payment' is not paid, the public transport company, will send the case to the Public Prosecutor. In spite of the maximum penalty stated above, the guidelines of Public Prosecutor Office stipulates the Prosecutor to seek a fine of €110 in a standard case of fare evasion. A criminal sentence for fare evasion leads to a criminal record.

Many public transport companies prefer an immediate payment of the fare and surcharge over the deferment of payment. In order to encourage immediate payment, some companies award a discount on the surcharge if paid right away. The NS lowers the surcharge to €50 in case of immediate payment.

==== Other measures ====
Besides fines and criminal prosecution, there are also other measures a public transport company can take against fare evaders. Frequent fare evaders can be banned from using a public transportation service. Acting in defiance of a ban constitutes a criminal offense.

== Criticisms ==
Most of the following criticisms have appeared in the Passenger Focus documents "Ticket to Ride" (2012) and "Ticket to Ride - an Update" (2015)

- There has been insufficient information about penalty fares schemes at stations and on websites. Despite some improvements, the information provision is still variable.
- Rail companies comment generally that posters at stations often go unnoticed by passengers, yet they may rely on these to announce the existence of penalty fares schemes. More effective ways of conveying the information, such as on Customer Information screens (CIS), are not always used. CIS displays may tell the company that runs your train, whether it is on time, what catering facilities it has, where first class seating is located but not that penalties apply without a valid ticket.
- Passenger Focus observes that "Posters that are a critical part of the penalty-fares system can be ‘lost’ when displayed with other posters. They are also sometimes positioned a short distance from the station entry points, or angled in a way that loses impact".
- The requirement to buy a ticket before boarding a train may not be entirely obvious to those are unfamiliar with the railway and accustomed to paying onboard other forms of transport, especially if warning notices are inadequate.
- Penalty fares further complicate an already complex system of fares and penalties, and as not all TOCs have penalty fares schemes, they mean that ticketless passengers are treated differently according to which trains they are on. There are examples of trains run by different companies operating over the same stretch of route but having different policies in place for ticketless passengers.
- The penalties are sometimes disproportionate to the offence and can amount to hundreds of pounds on long-distance routes because of the doubled cost to the next station, as calculated under the rules.
- Penalty fares can be issued even if the train company has suffered no financial loss as a result of the passenger's mistake: if an invalid ticket of the same value is held.
- Penalty fares schemes as currently operated may not sufficiently differentiate between passengers who make honest mistakes and those intending to evade fares.
- Lack of consistency since similar errors by passengers can result in very different outcomes: no penalty, a penalty fare or prosecution depending on the TOC's policy and the discretion of the inspectors. There are no national guidelines to ensure consistency, and there are criticisms about shortcomings in the training of staff.
- There is usually a difference in treatment of passengers who forget their season tickets compared to those who forget their railcards. The former group are often allowed to buy another ticket and then claim a refund later upon presentation of their season ticket. However, the latter group are liable to penalty fares.
- Discretion is not always being used correctly despite being a specific requirement of penalty fares schemes. There are claimed to be cases of disabled people given penalty fares when it should not have happened.
- There have been problems with buying and collecting tickets. Some ticket machines do not display basic information about restrictions, and there have been ticket-printing problems leading to penalty fares.
- Queuing times for tickets, at some larger regional stations, were regularly being breached when Passenger Focus undertook a study in 2010.
- During appeals, administration fees are sometimes added before the outcome of the appeal.
- Passenger Focus questioned whether an appeals body funded by a train company can be truly independent.
- There have been problems for people trying to appeal online, with the delays resulting in a penalty fare.
- There is a lack of transparency about how many penalties are issued and how many appeals allowed but no regular independent checks on the appeal bodies.
- The use of threats of prosecution under Railway Bylaw 18 to chase the civil debts of penalty fares has been criticised by Passenger Focus, which believes that the power given to the industry is being misused in some instances.

== See also ==
- British Transport Police
- National Rail Conditions of Carriage
- London Underground ticketing
