= Standard fare =

Higher public transport fare for users without a ticket

A standard fare is a higher than normal fare issued to passengers caught without a ticket. The system is used by public transport in the United Kingdom and Ireland. Standard Fares are not the same as Penalty Fares which are used on certain National Rail and Transport for London services and also on Nottingham Express Transit.

== United Kingdom ==
=== Edinburgh Trams ===
Passengers caught travelling on the Edinburgh Trams without a valid ticket are issued a £10 standard fare.

=== Manchester Metrolink ===
Passengers caught travelling on the Manchester Metrolink without a valid ticket used to be issued a £100 Standard Fare which was reduced to £50 if paid within 14 days. Failure to pay the standard fare was a criminal offence.

This has changed and it is now a penalty fare of £120 (reduced to £60 if paid within 14 days, including if paid automatically by contactless when caught by an inspector).

== Ireland ==
=== Dublin ===
A standard fare on Dublin Bus is €50. On Luas, it is €45. While these fares are far in excess of the maximum cash fares (€6 on Dublin Bus, €4 on Luas), legally they are not fines. However, any person who fails to pay a standard fare within a defined time (usually 21 days) after incurring it is liable to prosecution.
