= Special Investigations Officer (The Netherlands) =

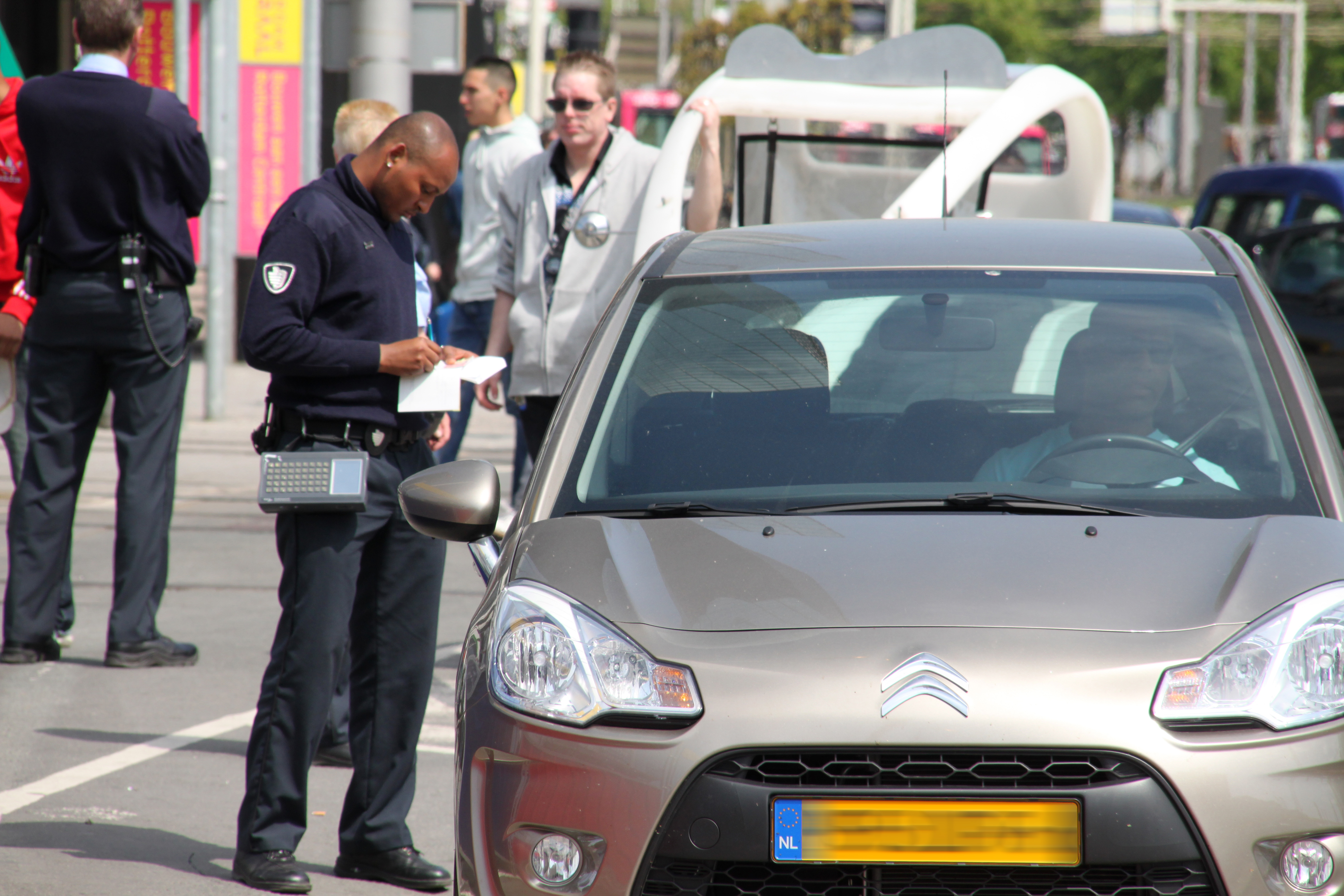
A Special Investigation Officer, employed by the municipality of Rotterdam is issuing a traffic fine to a motorist.

In The Netherlands, a Special Investigations Officer (Dutch: Buitengewoon Opsporingsambtenaar, abbreviated as BOA), is an individual who holds law enforcement powers for a limited section of law and in a limited geographic area. This is in contrary to General Investigations Officers (Algemeen Opsporingsambtenaar) employed by the police, who may exercise their authority across almost all laws.

In 2021 there were more than 23,000 special law enforcement officers employed at over 1100 law enforcement organizations.

== Dedicated education ==
Prior to being appointed, a candidate must successfully complete a written and practical exam. The written exam tests the candidate's knowledge on criminal (procedure) law and constitutional law. Candidates also take an additional exam based on the exact scope of their duties. While the exams are the bare minimum requirements to be qualified, there are dedicated educational programs that train people how to work as a special investigation officer. These programs take two to three years, including internships at law enforcement organizations.

== Use of force and issue of weapons ==
Special investigation officers may be authorized to use force in the scope of their duty. In addition to that they may be authorized to carry and use several types of weapons. The Ministry of Justice decides, within the limits of the law, which officers are authorized to use force and/or carry weapons. These weapons may include;

- Handcuffs
- Baton
- Pepper spray
- Handgun

== Recognition ==
Special investigations officers that interact with the public must visibly wear the emblem as determined by the government, displayed at the picture at the right side of this page. The exception to this rule are officers that work in plainclothes and officers that are employed at the police, military police and Customs.
