= 1977 Dutch cabinet formation =

Formation of the first Van Agt cabinet

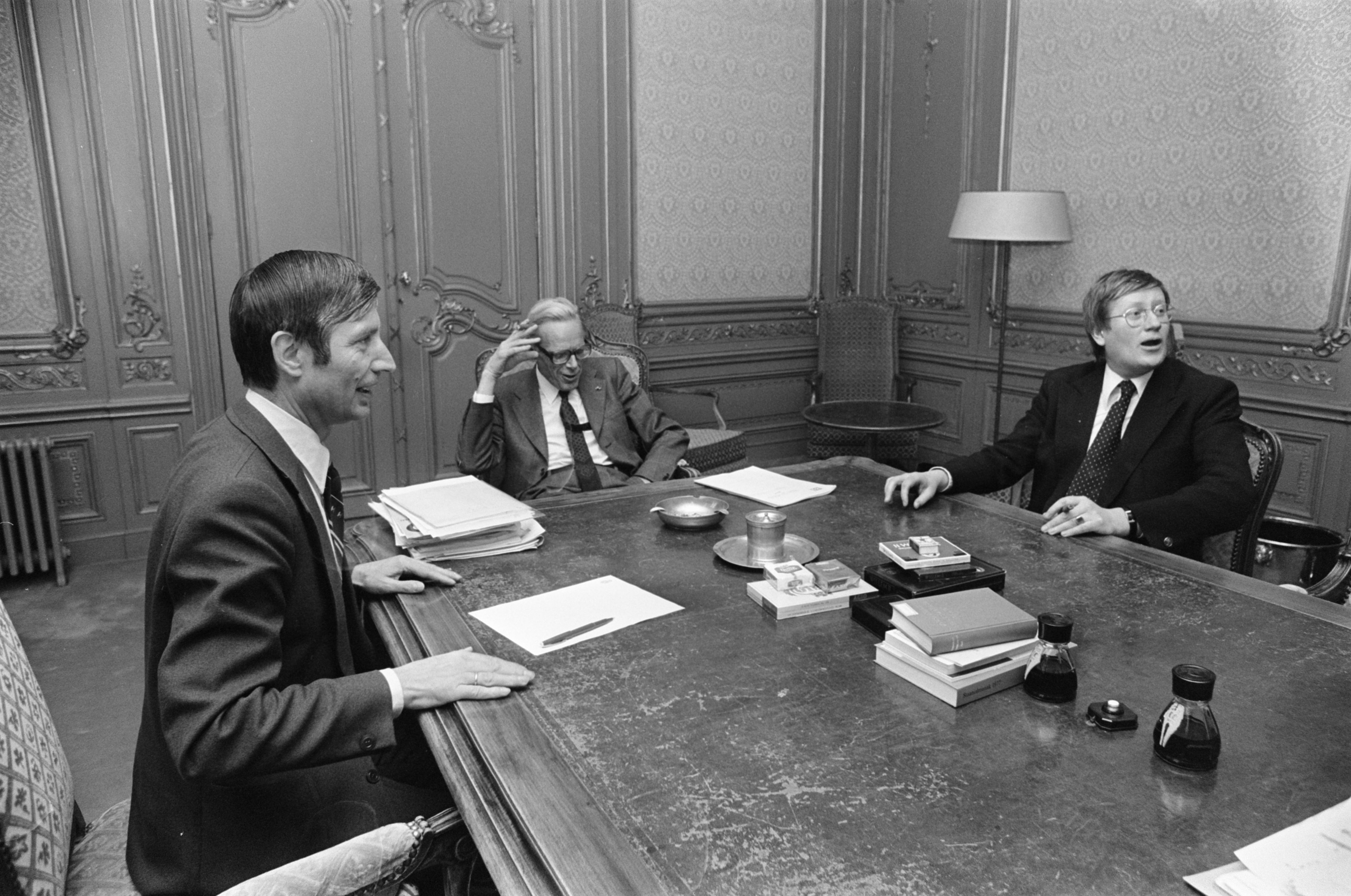
Van Agt (l) and Wiegel (r) discussing the distribution of ministerial posts led by informateur Van der Grinten

After the Dutch general election of 25 May 1977, a cabinet formation took place in the Netherlands. On 19 December 1977, this resulted in the first Van Agt cabinet. The coalition was formed by the Christian Democratic Appeal (CDA) and the People's Party for Freedom and Democracy (VVD).

During the first five months, negotiations took place under formateur Joop den Uyl about a cabinet of Labour Party (PvdA), the largest party, CDA and D'66. This got stuck four times, and informateurs were asked to bring the parties together again. After the fourth time the break turned out to be permanent. Within a month, the CDA managed to reach an agreement with the VVD. Six members of the CDA parliamentary group – the loyalists – voted against the agreement, but tolerated the cabinet, so that the cabinet retained a majority.

The formation lasted 208 days and was then the longest Dutch cabinet formation. (Note: Since then equaled by the formations in 2017 and 2021-2022.) Due to its long duration and unexpected outcome, it is known as the "mother of all formations".

== Background ==
=== Den Uyl cabinet ===
The Den Uyl cabinet led by Prime Minister Joop den Uyl had PvdA, D'66 and Political Party Radicals (PPR) as a coalition. As part of the progressive cooperation for the 1972 Dutch general election, these parties had a joint government program: Keerpunt 1972. During the cabinet formation of 1972-'73 the denominational parties Christian-Historical Union (CHU), Anti Revolutionary Party (ARP) and Catholic People's Party (KVP) to play each other off. The latter two provided ministers and tolerated the cabinet as an extra-parliamentary cabinet.

During this period, KVP, ARP and CHU were in the process of merging into the Christian Democratic Appeal (CDA). The actual merger did not take place until 1980, but the parties already wanted one list of candidates. Intended lead candidate was Deputy Prime Minister and Minister of Justice Dries van Agt, from the KVP. He was appreciated for his principled position in the abortion debate and the way in which he regularly antagonized the PvdA.

Relations within the cabinet were poor and the 'fighting cabinet' fell just before the elections. The low point was the personal attack by PvdA MP Aad Kosto on Van Agt in the debate on Menten case on 23 February 1977. Kosto called Van Agt an incompetent minister who was unsuitable as a political leader. A month later, the cabinet fell after the cabinet crisis over land policy, one of the four major social reforms that the cabinet had announced on the basis of Keerpunt '72.

=== Distribution of seats ===
The distribution of seats in the House of Representatives during the cabinet formation. See list of members of the House of Representatives of the Netherlands, 1977–1981 for details. CPN (2) PvdA (53) PSP (1) DS'70 (1) PPR (3) D'66 (8) VVD (28) CDA (49) RPF (1) BP (1) SGP (3)

The PvdA won ten seats and reached 53 seats, the highest score by any party to date. The CDA obtained 49 seats, one seat more than its predecessors in 1972. After the elections, the CDA parliamentary group consisted of 26 KVP members, 12 ARP members and 11 CHU members. The VVD won six seats and ended up with 28 seats. D'66 increased from six to eight seats. The remaining parties dropped from 31 to twelve seats in total, and did not play a meaningful role in the formation. Based on this result, PvdA and CDA already had a majority of 102 seats. Supplemented with D'66, this would be 110 seats. On the other hand, the combination of CDA and VVD also had a narrow majority of 77 seats.

=== Hostage takings ===
The election campaign and formation were interrupted by hostage takings by South Moluccan youth. Two days before the elections they hijacked a train at De Punt and held a primary school in Bovensmilde hostage. These actions largely brought the campaign to a standstill. The hostage takings would last until 11 June 1977, during the formation. It meant that the PvdA could not celebrate its election win and that the formation only got underway later. Van Agt, as Minister of Justice, was particularly busy with the hostage takings and the parliamentary debate afterwards.

== Formateur Den Uyl (1) ==
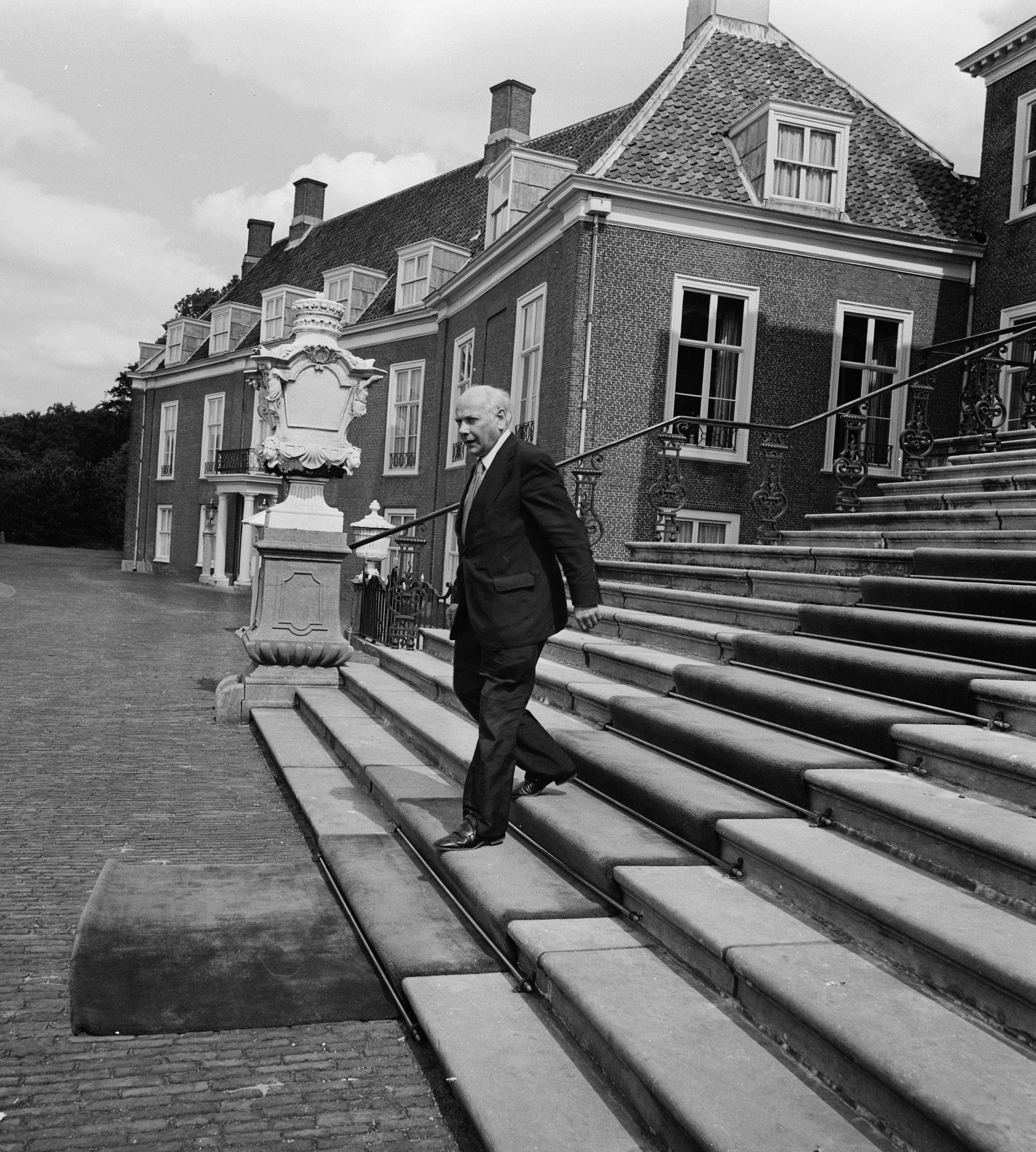
Den Uyl leaves Paleis Ten Bosch where he spoke with queen Juliana (31 May 1977)

After discussions with her advisors (Note: These were Speaker of the House of Representatives Anne Vondeling (PvdA), Chairman of the Senate Theo Thurlings (CDA) and vice-president of the Council of State Marinus Ruppert) and the parliamentary leaders appointed queen Juliana Den Uyl as formateur. The PvdA parliamentary group advised appointing Den Uyl as formateur, although some members urged caution. Van Agt also advised appointing Den Uyl as formateur, because an information round was sooner would lead to rigidity in the CDA parliamentary group. Wiegel expressed his doubts about the stability of a cabinet of PvdA and CDA given the fall of the previous cabinet. He also pointed out the fact that CDA and VVD together had a majority. Juliana ultimately gave Den Uyl the task of "forming a cabinet that can be expected to have the confidence of parliament to enjoy". Den Uyl stated that he aimed for a majority cabinet of PvdA, CDA and D'66, with a progressive character. A large part of the CDA parliamentary group reacted negatively to this interpretation that it had to have a "progressive character".

=== Negotiation strategies ===
For the PvdA, cabinet participation was not the most important thing and cabinet participation could only take place if they had the upper hand. This strategy was written down in the note 'What to do with a gain of ten seats?' by Ed van Thijn, who replaced Den Uyl as PvdA negotiator. The main goal was electoral success in the 1978 provincial elections. A "certain tension relationship" with the CDA would be good for this, the so-called "polarization strategy" that the party has used since 1966. In terms of content, the reform proposals of the previous government had to be achieved, the standard of one percent growth per year of the collective sector had to be adhered to and it had to be guaranteed that an initiative draft on abortion would be ratified with a countersign. The party board and congress had imposed the majority strategy against the wishes of the parliamentary group and Den Uyl. This stipulated that PvdA had to have as many ministers as CDA and D' 66 together, to prevent PvdA from being voted out in the Council of Ministers. PvdA had to claim Justice to keep Van Agt out of the cabinet and another post next to Finance in the socio-economic triangle. Van Thijn's note leaked and was published in de Volkskrant on 9 June, which immediately fueled distrust within CDA.

For the CDA, the priority was also not entirely on the success of a cabinet, but on the formation of real unity in the CDA. Within the parliamentary group there was division about governing. with the PvdA. ARP members led by Wim Aantjes were in favor, while KVP members such as Frans Andriessen and especially CHU members wanted to enter into confrontation. In any case, the starting point for participation in a cabinet with the PvdA was equality. For example, the CDA wanted as many ministerial positions as the PvdA. They did not want D'66 in the coalition anyway – after all, the party was not needed for a majority – so they thought that PvdA itself should give up ministerial positions for D'66. Another place for PvdA in the socio-economic triangle was out of the question, because Den Uyl, as Prime Minister, was constantly interfering with it. Van Agt had to return to Justice if he did not want to remain in Parliament. The CDA preferred to discuss abortion first and discuss the reform proposals in a broader socio-economic context.

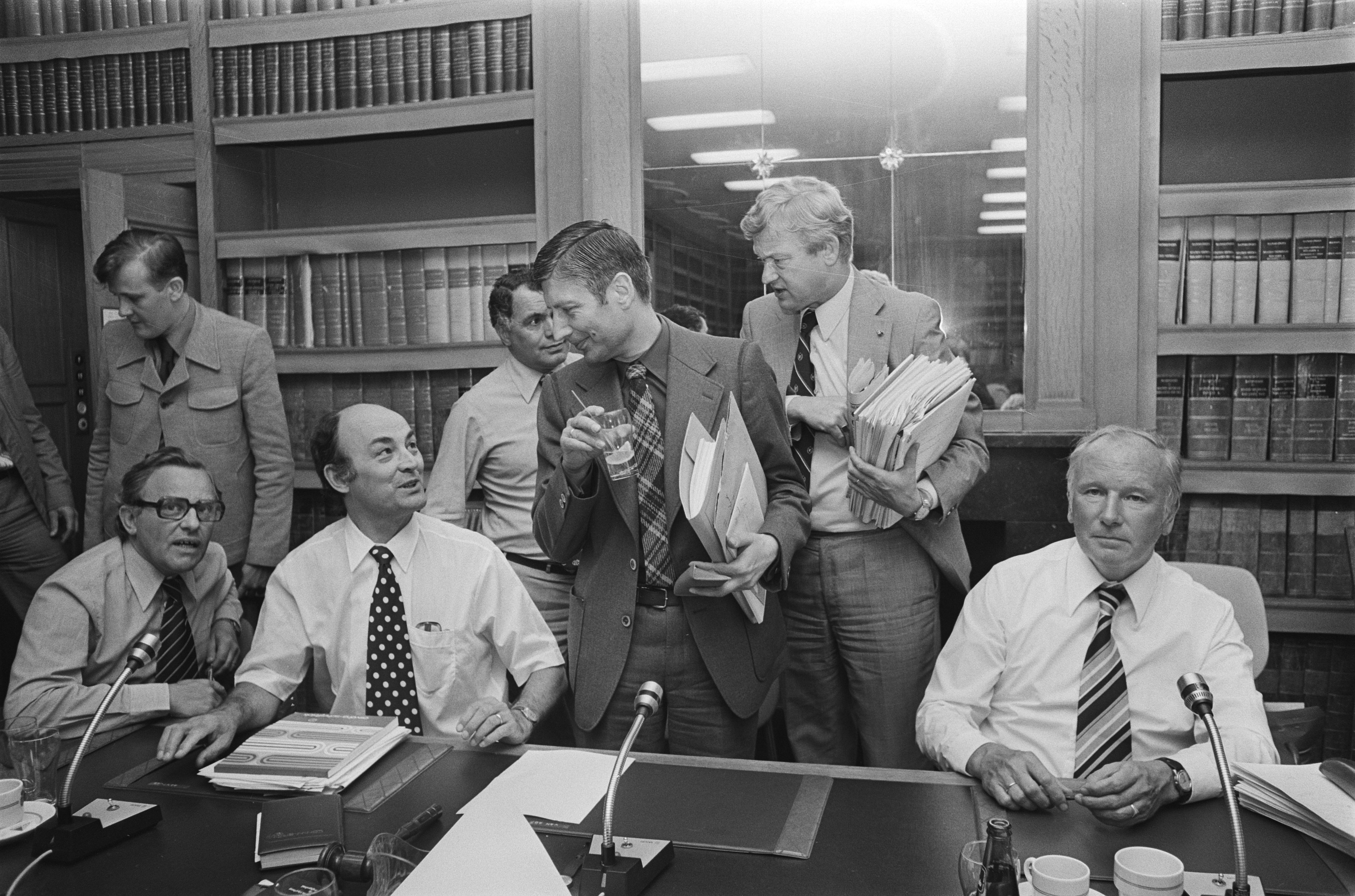
CDA parliamentary group meeting on 12 July 1977 in connection with the cabinet formation. Standing (from left to right): parliamentary group employee Joop van Rijswijk, parliamentary group board members Peijnenburg, Van Agt and Andriessen. Seated (from left to right): party secretary Kleisterlee and party board members Aantjes and Kruisinga.

The division was not only substantive, but also arose from personal ambitions. Although Van Agt was easily elected as party leader at the first party meeting, the election of the deputy party leader exposed a tribal war. Andriessen was initially chosen over Aantjes, who reacted angrily. The minutes of this meeting were subsequently leaked, after which Van Agt persuaded Andriessen to withdraw in order to maintain unity. This time no election was called, meaning the vice-presidency fell to the number two on the list; Aantjes. CHU leader Roelof Kruisinga was mainly interested in a ministerial post and contacted PvdA members about this. Aantjes also had a lot of contact with the PvdA. Andriessen, on the other hand, had the most contact with Van Agt of the three. CDA policy officer Joop van Rijswijk noted about the internal cooperation: "In fact, our parliamentary group has a four-person leadership. But this leadership collective [...] exhausts itself in eyeing each other and distrusting each other and in running under the feet of the party leader."

=== Negotiations ===
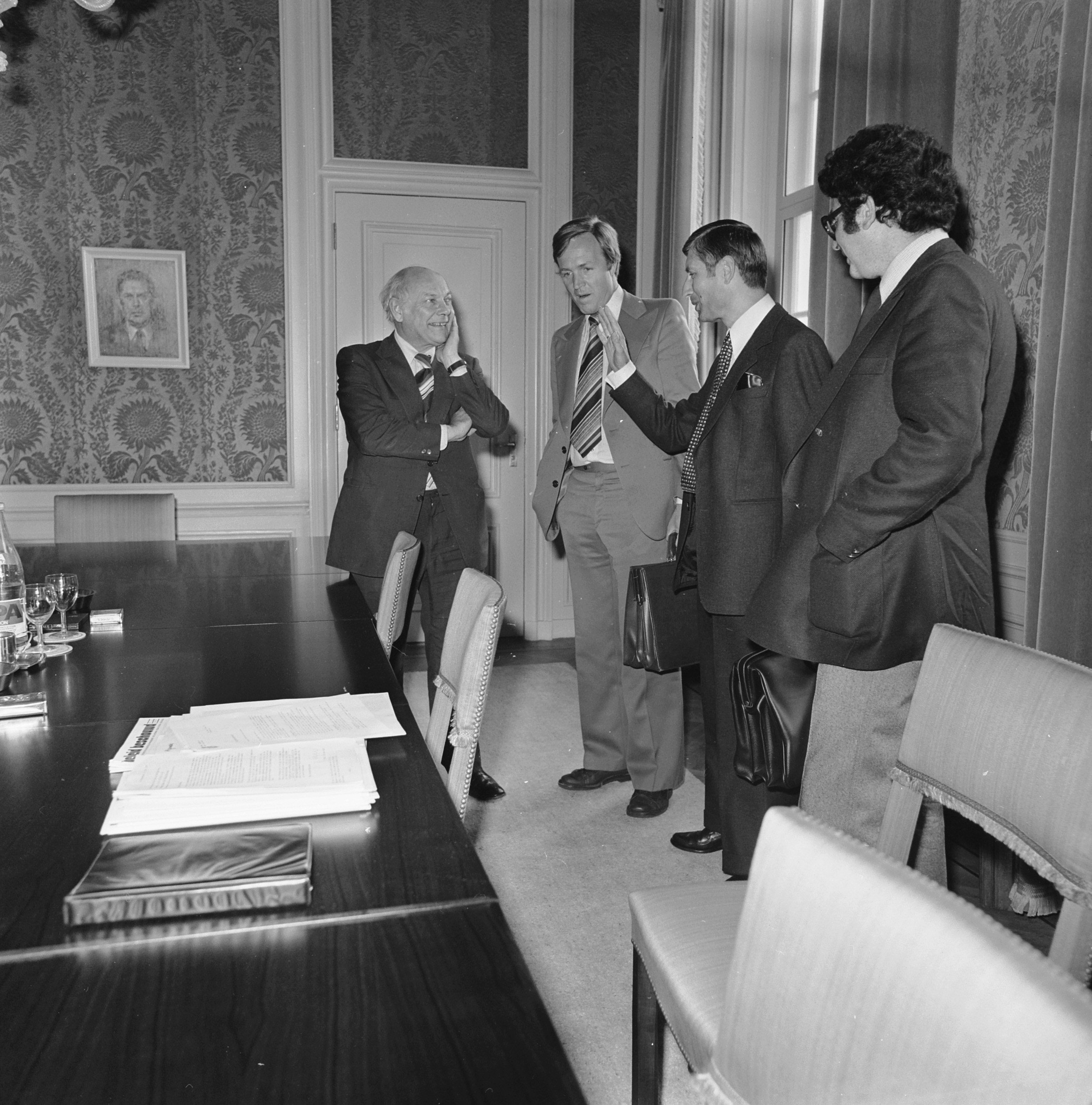
Den Uyl receives Terlouw, Van Agt, Van Thijn on the first day of the substantive negotiations

In the first two weeks, the parties managed to reach an agreement on three of the four reform proposals. Due to the hostage takings and their settlement, substantive negotiations did not begin until 27 June. There had been a lot of fuss about the order of topics to be discussed in the weeks before. Eventually they started with land policy, because the previous cabinet had fallen on that issue. The negotiators virtually managed to settle this protracted issue in one evening, with agreement on the most important points arranged on 5 July. That day they reached agreement on the capital gains tax and on 8 July on the works councils, two of the other reform proposals. Van Agt managed to win important points in all three, to the dissatisfaction of the left flank of the PvdA.

The pressure was then greater for PvdA to score on the last of the four reforms; the capital growth sharing (VAD). At the request of the CDA, this was combined with the discussion about the 'Memorandum regarding the financial, social and economic policy to be pursued' (also known as Memo II) drawn up by Den Uyl. It proposed four billion in austerity and wage moderation, but also attractive measures for the trade union movement. The CDA thought the cuts were insufficient and did not believe in the proposed wage moderation. Employers and the right part of the CDA parliamentary group were also dissatisfied with the automatic price compensation. On 12 July negotiators discussed the VAD again, with Den Uyl increasing pressure on D'66 and CDA to agree quickly. Van Agt submitted nine amendment proposals to the VAD. Den Uyl accepted three of these suggestions, but Van Agt continued to refuse.

On 15 July Den Uyl subsequently gave back his assignment. Den Uyl indicated that he was "bitterly disappointed", but the impression was that he had stopped too early. Van Agt stated that a solution had to be found for the VAD, because the PvdA and CDA were dependent on each other. He indicated to his group that he was prepared to drop a number of demands regarding the VAD. The top of the CDA suspected pressure from the trade union FNV, as well as a political maneuver, in which PvdA hoped to have a better negotiating position if a formation attempt between CDA and VVD had failed.

== Informateur Albeda ==
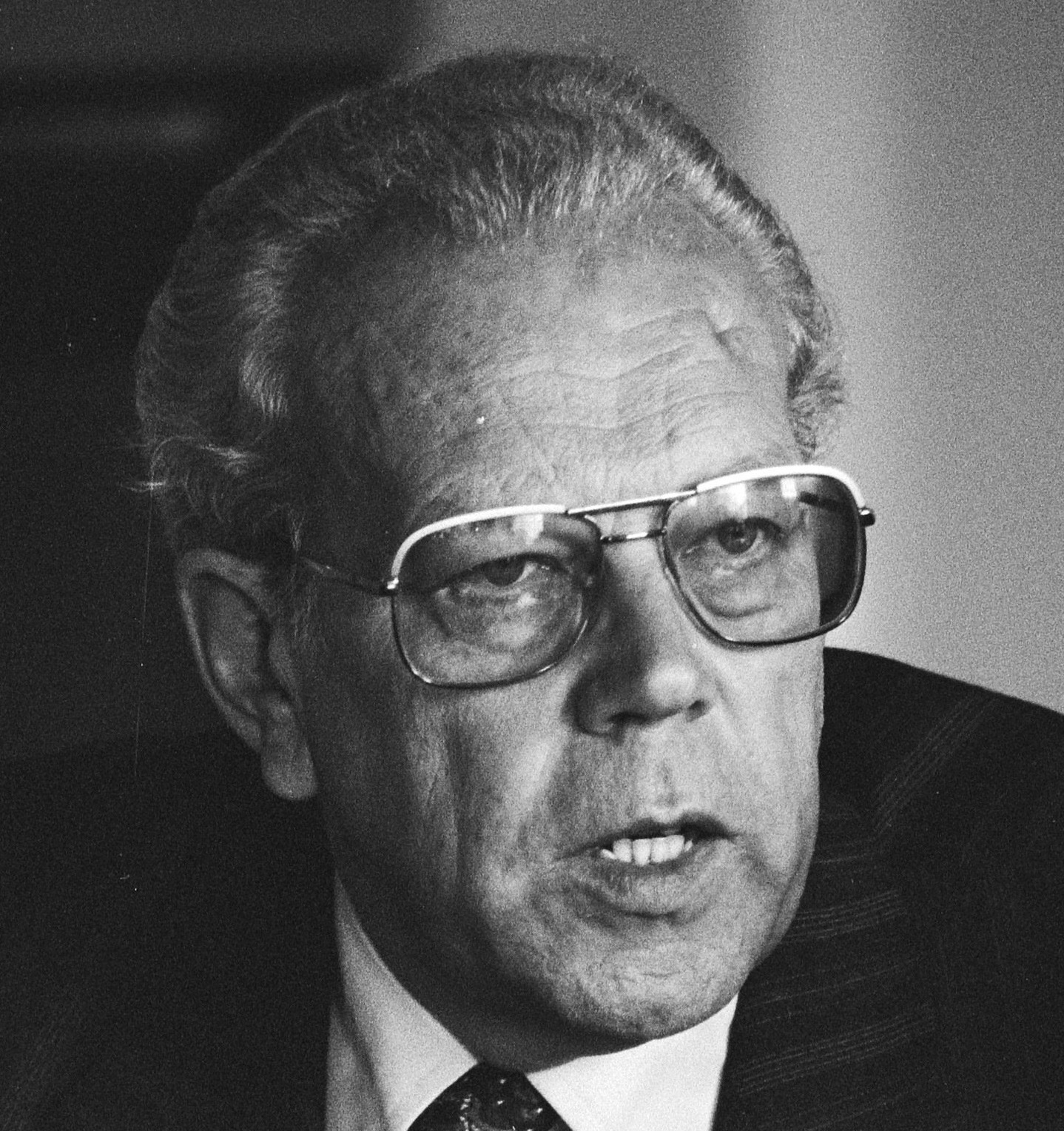
Informateur Wil Albeda

After the break, Van Agt was asked to be a formateur, but he requested that the Queen not have to accept the assignment. Vondeling, Van Thijn and Wiegel had advised the queen to appoint Van Agt as formateur of a cabinet of VVD and CDA. Thurlings advised against this, because the options for a cabinet of PvdA and CDA had not yet been exhausted. Van Agt also first wanted an attempt by an informateurs from PvdA or CDA. Investigating another cabinet was undesirable for him, because it had a high chance of failure and would therefore undermine CDA's negotiating position. Nevertheless, the queen took the advice of the majority and ordered Van Agt to form a cabinet on 18 July. This was to the dismay of the CDA, which suspected her of being in cahoots with Den Uyl. Van Agt requested that the queen not have to accept the assignment, to which the queen complied.

After divided advice, the queen appointed ARP member Wil Albeda as informateurs. The first round of advice on 19 July resulted in such divided advice that the Queen invited Van Thijn, Van Agt and Terlouw for a joint discussion a day later. During a preliminary meeting that morning, the three concluded that unnecessary misunderstandings had arisen. Later that day, Wil Albeda was appointed as informateur to 'resolve the differences of opinion that arose during the Den Uyl formation, so that this formation can be resumed'. Albeda was a left-wing and progressive CDA member, from the ARP and had been involved as an informateur in the formation of the Den Uyl cabinet in 1973.

Albeda managed to reach a compromise within a week and thus complete his assignment. Albeda limited itself to the VAD and ignored Memo II. CDA made a significant contribution to the compromise and the compromise even went further than Den Uyl's proposal. Van Agt wanted to include in the draft conclusions that the VAD depended on the treatment of Memo II, but Van Thijn blocked this. When Aantjes heard that Van Agt's attempt was inspired by Andriessen, he angrily shouted in front of the press and cameras that he would go home if Van Agt only wanted to do business with Andriessen. Within the CDA parliamentary group, five members, including Andriessen, objected to the result on 28 July. In his report of 26 July Albeda recommended that Den Uyl be made formateur again. Den Uyl proposed making Albeda a special advisor, but this was rejected by the CDA.

== Formateur Den Uyl (2) ==
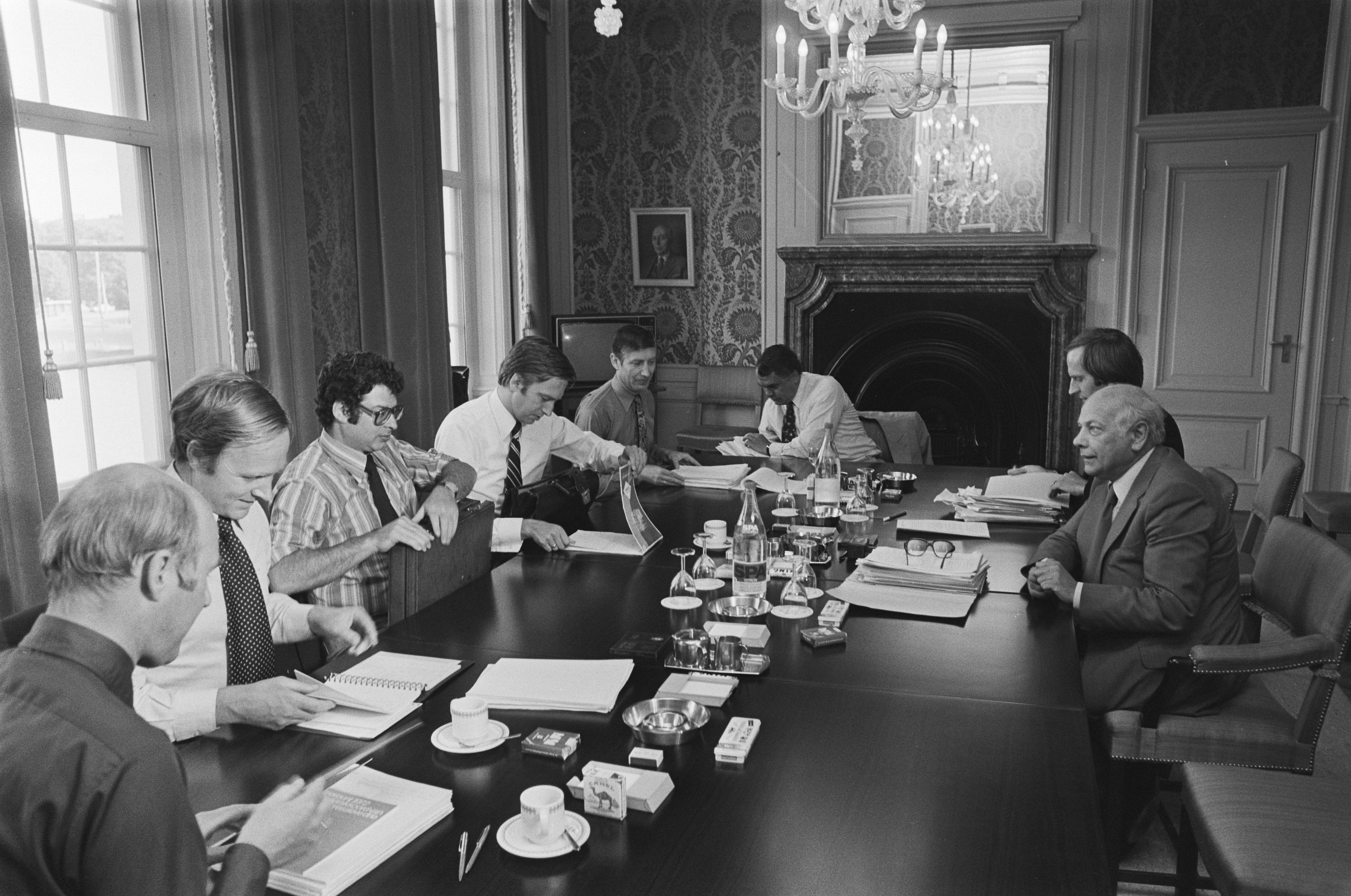
The negotiators of PvdA, CDA, D'66 with informateur Den Uyl and their parliamentary group specialists

On 28 July Den Uyl again became a formateur with the same assignment. Discussions on Memo II continued. For the first time in a cabinet formation, the negotiators were accompanied by a parliamentary groupspecialist; Dick Dolman (PvdA), Peijnenburg (CDA) and Erwin Nypels (D'66). Within a week they came to conclusions on this subject, with the possibility of additional cuts if it proved insufficient. The CDA parliamentary group agreed to this, despite five dissidents including Andriessen who, among other things, thought the cuts did not go far enough. (Note: It also included Harry Notenboom, Wiel Bremen, Kees van Dijk and Durk van der Mei.)

There was also a lot of criticism from the PvdA parliamentary group, but Van Thijn refused to renegotiate. Ultimately, Duisenberg, Poppe and Spieker voted against. The first thought the cuts did not go far enough, the last two thought the cuts went too far. There was also resistance outside the parliamentary group, including candidate ministers who indicated that they wanted to renegotiate this memo later. Criticism from de Volkskrant on the result and Van Thijn led to the party board becoming more involved in the formation.

=== Abortion ===
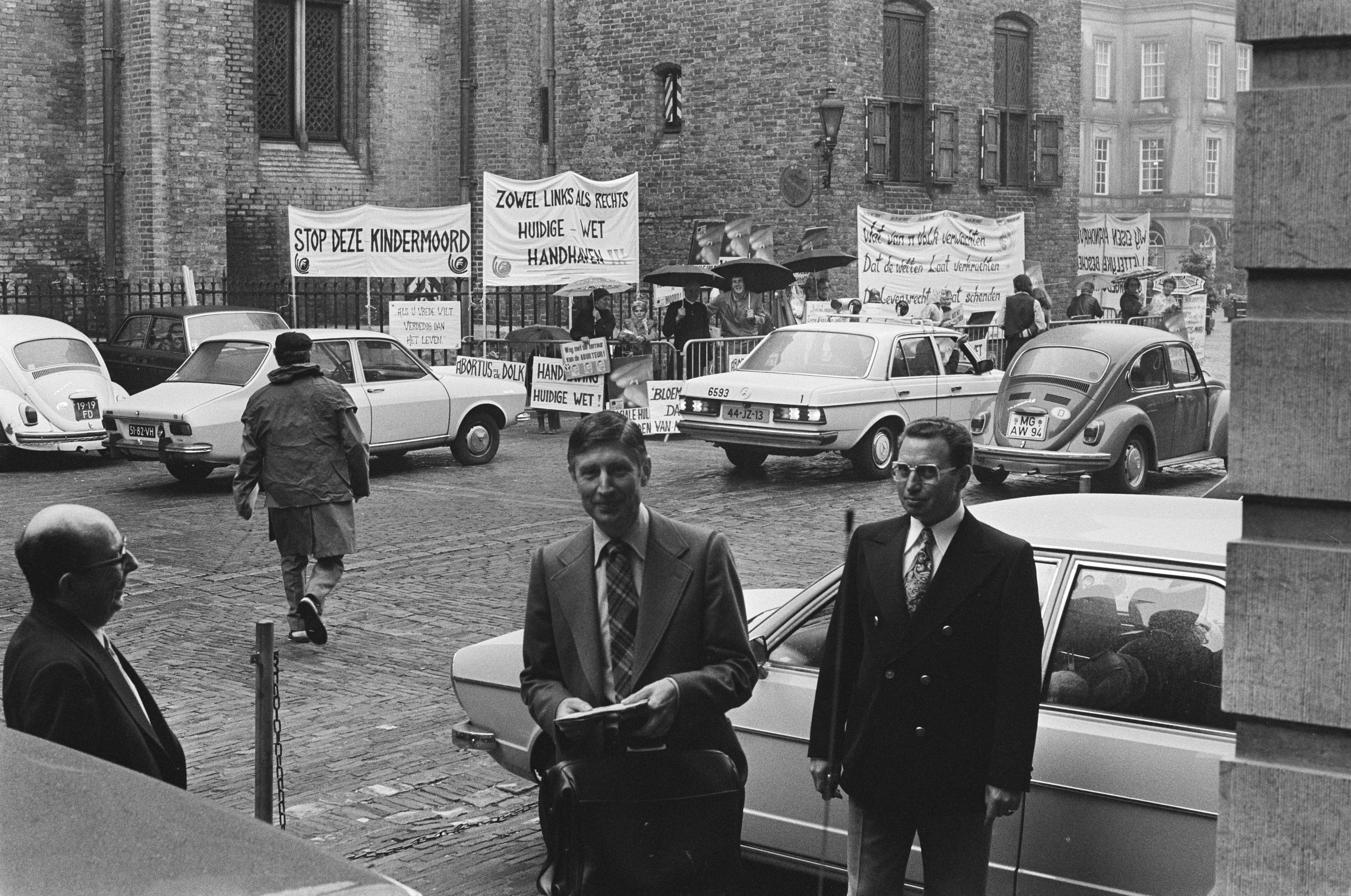
Van Agt arrives at Binnenhof. In the background a demonstration against legal regulations on abortion.

Under pressure from the CDA, abortion was the next topic in the formation. Although there was a majority in favor of this in the House of Representatives with PvdA, VVD and D'66, Van Agt had profiled himself in the campaign with his opposition to it. A majority of the parliamentary group decided that Van Agt could express the unanimous position of the parliamentary group that the CDA did not accept a compromise on this subject. This tactic was undermined when the minutes were leaked to Den Uyl and later De Tijd, which showed that a minority was willing to compromise.

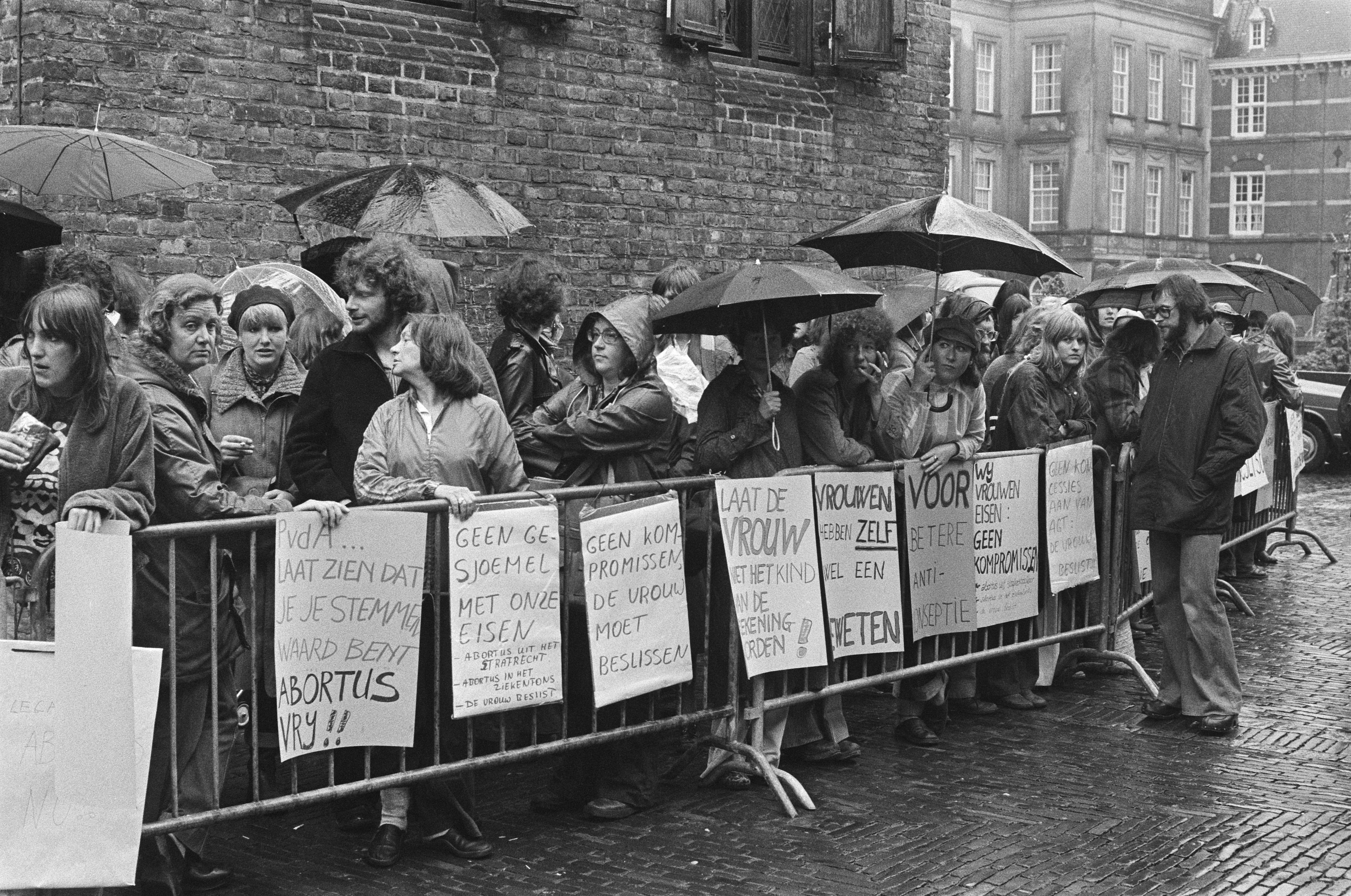
Demonstrators in the Binnenhof for a legal regulation of abortion

Because substantive agreement seemed impossible, the parties tried to reach a procedural agreement. PvdA wanted an agreement that an adopted initiative would simply be provided with the countersign of the competent minister. Van Agt proposed setting up a consultation group that would find a way out within two years. As long as that group was still active and the government had not spoken out about it, government factions should not support initiatives on this subject. Both parties could not live with the other's proposals. The CDA then concluded that it was "unfortunately unlikely" that there would be a cabinet of PvdA, CDA and D'66. Den Uyl therefore handed in his formateur assignment on 25 August.

== Informateur Veringa ==
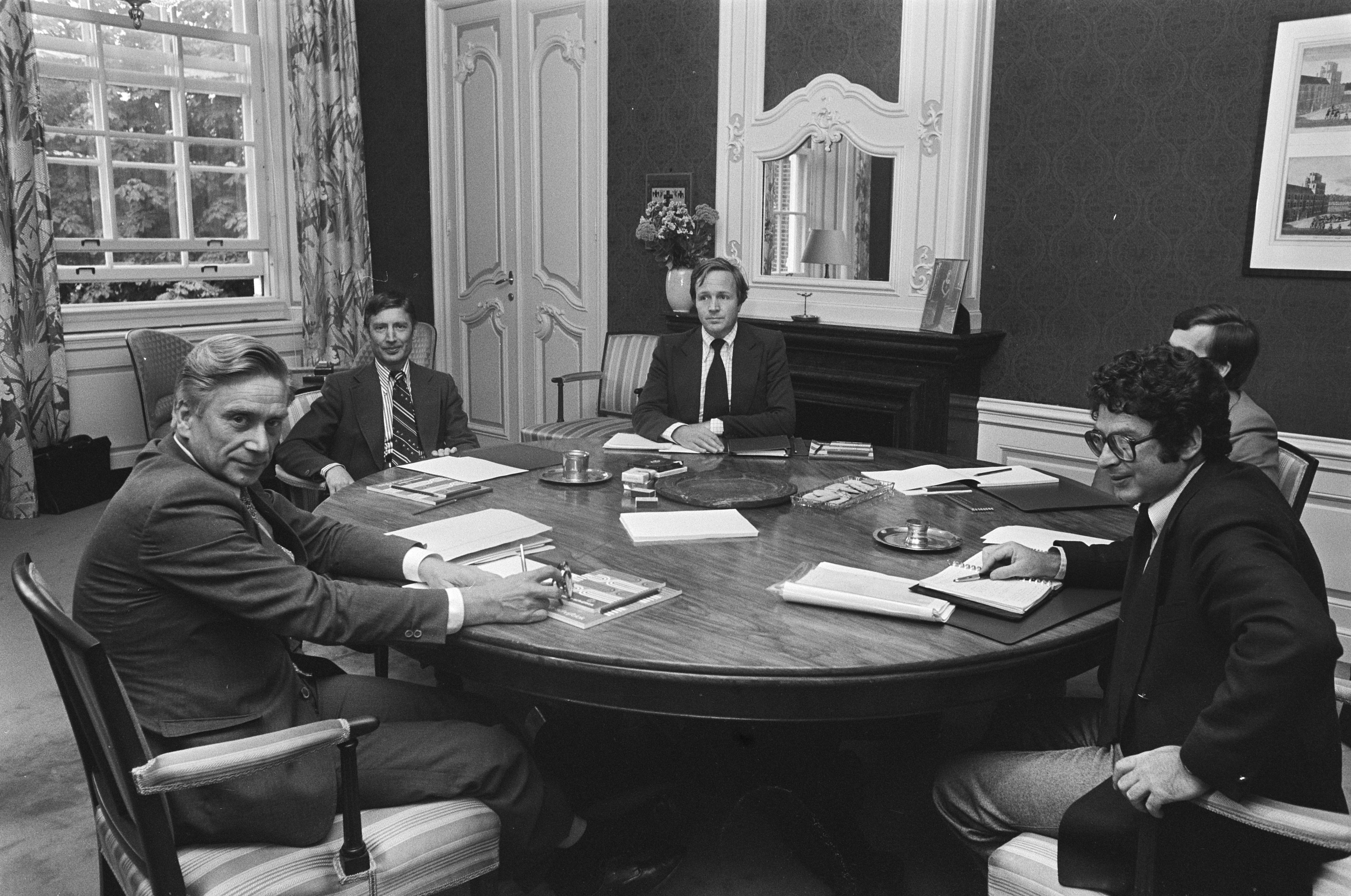
Informateur Veringa with Van Agt, Terlouw, council advisor Tjeenk Willink and Van Thijn

The queen once again sought advice from her permanent advisors and the parliamentary leaders. Van Thijn advised to appoint Den Uyl again as formateur with a broader remit including the possibility of a minority cabinet. Wiegel proposed forming a 'national cabinet'. Van Agt advised appointing a CDA informateurs with a broad remit, including the possibility of a CDA minority cabinet. The queen took Van Agt's advice and on 26 August appointed the Gerard Veringa, state councilor and former KVP leader mentioned by Van Agt.

Despite a confidential letter from Van Agt in which he pushed for a CDA minority cabinet, Veringa first tried to see whether PvdA, CDA and D'66 could not reach a procedural agreement on abortion. Van Agt wanted to avoid losing face and whispered a formula to Veringa that the negotiators could agree with. In this formula, the cabinet would first try to come up with a proposal itself. If this had not been achieved before 1 January 1979, parliament was allowed to adopt its own initiative. The cabinet would then decide on the countersign after submitting it to the Council of State. The CDA agreed to this proposal, although seven party members, including Andriessen, were against.

On 2 September Veringa reported to the queen. There was commotion when Van Thijn indicated in an interview that every initiative, regardless of the content, would become a law. However, the CDA had agreed on the assumption that their objections would be taken into account. Discussions about the agreement took place for a month. It was added in the final report of 8 October that all parties had to be sufficiently in agreement with the bill, but that a future cabinet member would not be able to block the countersigning.

== Informateurs Den Uyl and Veringa ==
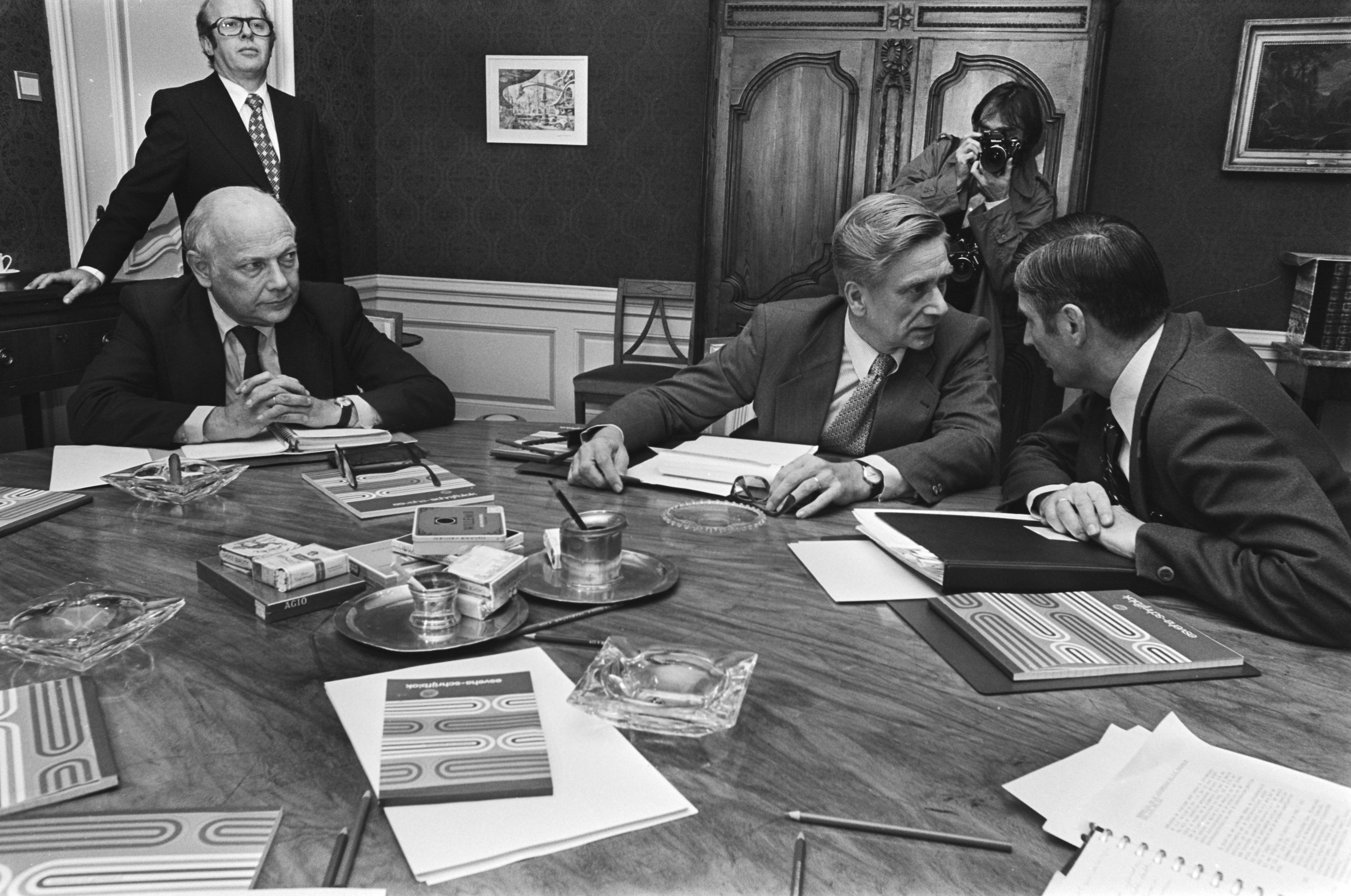
Informateur Den Uyl, Veringa and CDA party leader Van Agt

Veringa indicated that he wanted to continue, but to the dissatisfaction of the CDA, Den Uyl was also appointed as an informateurs. Under the guidance of the informateurss, they continued to discuss sensitive topics, such as the construction of nuclear power stations, the budget for defense and the position of special education. The atmosphere deteriorated between the negotiators at that time because of the long duration. Van Agt put into perspective the length to which Den Uyl had the queen pronounce in the speech from the throne of 20 September: "The long duration of the cabinet formation, after an election result that was nevertheless experienced by many as clear, is a source of concern among the current circumstances understandable concern."

On 21 September, negotiators reached an agreement. The PvdA and D'66 parliamentary groups unanimously supported the agreement. The PvdA party council also agreed, albeit with difficulty. The CDA parliamentary group also agreed and only three CHU members voted against.

=== Distribution of ministerial posts ===
After the agreement was finalized, the subject of ministerial posts returned. Van Thijn demanded 8-7-1 ministerial positions for PvdA, CDA and D'66 respectively, but PvdA also wanted to keep Van Agt out of the cabinet. Van Agt claimed 7-7-1, referring to equality, and indicated within his party that he wanted to return to Justice. Terlouw wanted 7-7-2. To break the impasse, Van Agt awarded a second post to D'66 provided they were 'minuscule' and 'ungrateful'. After a stalemate, the PvdA indicated that 7-7-2 was only acceptable if certain CDA members were not in the cabinet. For example, the PvdA could not agree to Kruisinga, Andriessen and Van Agt in the cabinet. This did not lead to a breakthrough.

On 3 October after an impasse, Van Agt indicated that he was not available for cabinet and would not return as party leader: "I am going into the political forest." In this way, Van Agt wanted to retain Justice for the CDA. This was received with enthusiasm by Van Thijn. When Van Agt reported this to his party a day later, they whistled him back because it was humiliating and politically unacceptable. After another attempt at negotiations that failed to reach an agreement, the informateurs gave back their assignment on 6 October.

== Informateurs Verdam and Vrolijk ==
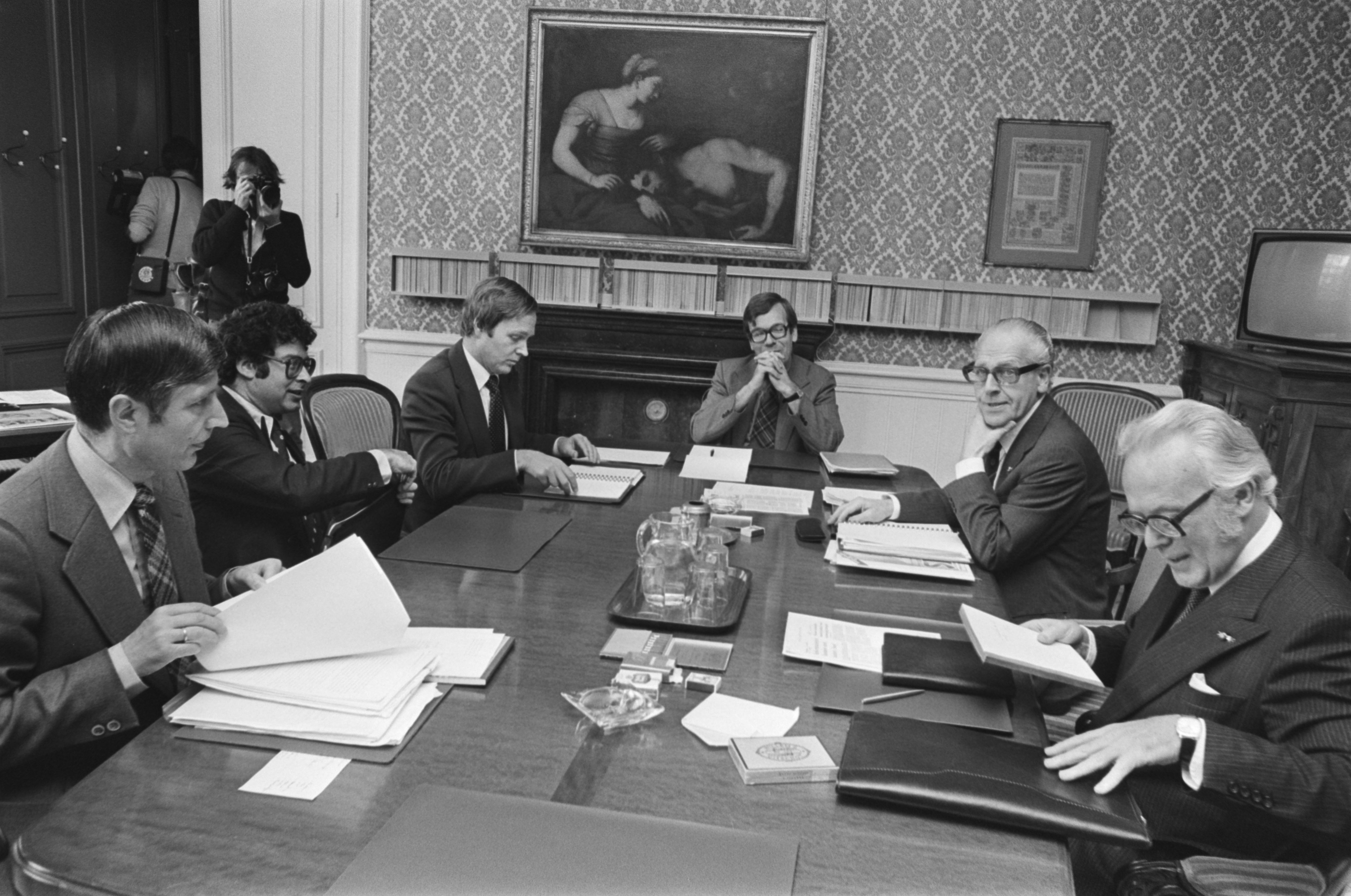
From left to right negotiators Van Agt, Van Thijn, Terlouw, council advisor Herman Tjeenk Willink and informateur Verdam and Vrolijk

On 11 October the queen appointed the Queen's Commissioners Koos Verdam (Utrecht, from the ARP) and Maarten Vrolijk (South Holland, from the PvdA) to informateurs. Implicitly, their order was to continue negotiations. This led to rare criticism because she went against given advice. Van Agt, for example, had proposed more right-wing informateurs. Within the CDA it was suspected that Aantjes had directed the person and the assignment through Ruppert.

Despite a false start, the informateurs managed to achieve a result. Van Thijn was about to agree to 7-7-2 at the start, when the informateurs came up with a substantiated proposal for 8-7-1. Van Agt immediately rejected this, but as a result Van Thijn could not agree to the informateurs' proposal 7-7-2 the next day, for which the only argument they put forward was that 8-7-1 was not feasible. As a result, the negotiations became stuck again, and the negotiators wanted to give back their assignment halfway through the second week. They decided not to do this because the negotiators still indicated that the second Den Uyl cabinet was the intention. During the 'final conversation' on 20 October with the informateurs, Van Agt suggested to Justice to D'66, as the only post for D'66, but that the CDA received other ministries in return. A break was taken so that Van Thijn could consult Den Uyl. After the break, however, Van Agt withdrew his proposal, so that the negotiations were stuck again. The informateurs decided to let Van Thijn and Van Agt talk further in private - a novelty. Ultimately, on 24 October, they reached an agreement in which CDA did receive Justice, but Van Agt went to Home Affairs and the score was 7-7-2.

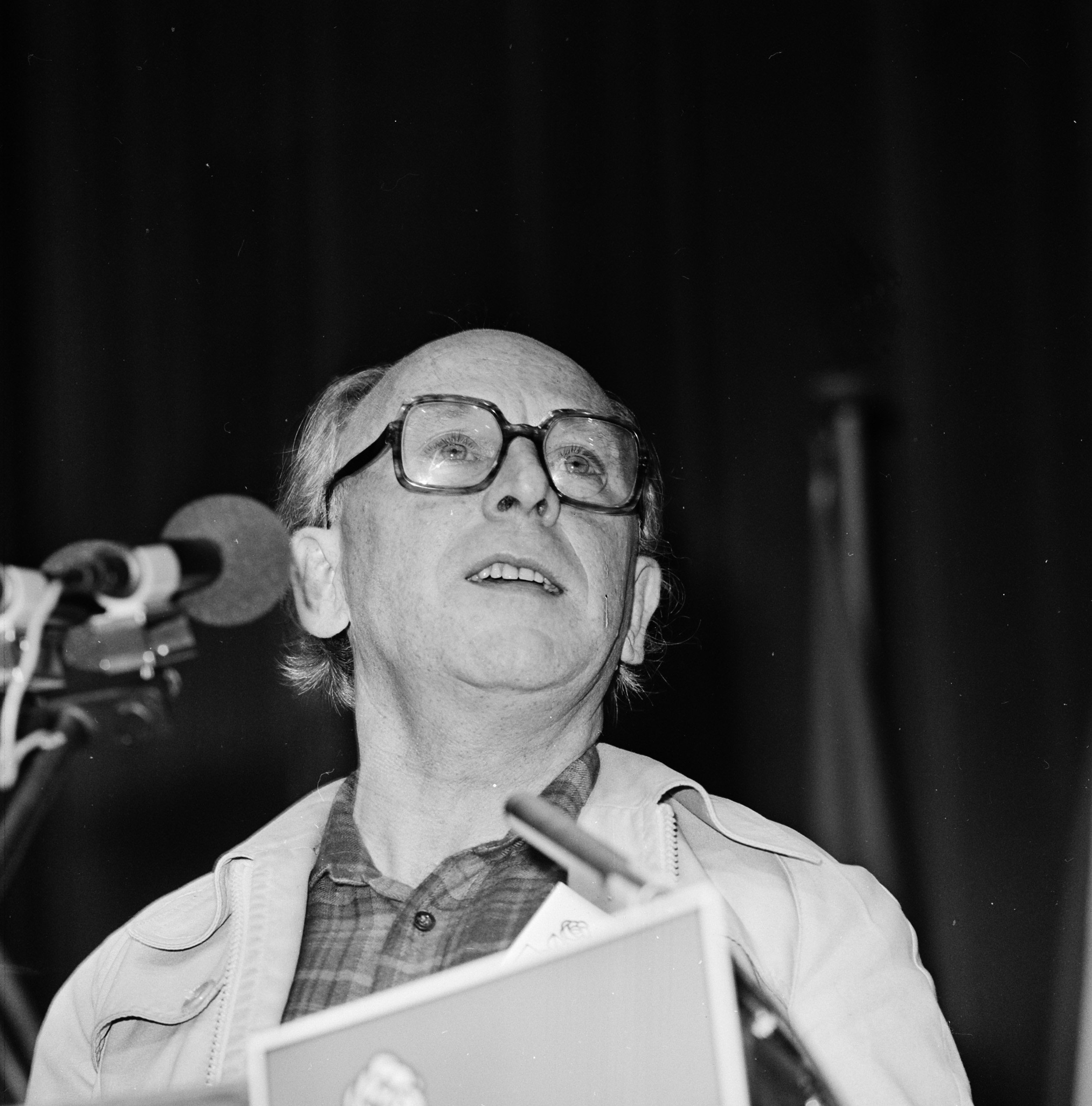
Piet Reckman speaking during the extraordinary congress of the PvdA on 5 November

The result was poorly received within the PvdA. While Van Agt celebrated it as a success, Van Thijn presented it as a half-defeat. It went against the majority strategy. This sentiment was reinforced by criticism in de Volkskrant. With difficulty, Van Thijn managed to get past the party council and parliamentary group (32 votes in favor, 14 against), but a motion by activist Piet Reckman was adopted by the party council (Note: 53 in favor, 35 against) in which cabinet participation was rejected under these conditions. Supported by the parliamentary group, where only five members now voted against, Den Uyl and Van Thijn ignored the party council's ruling. The conflict with the party council should be settled at the special party conference on 5 November.

== Formateur Den Uyl (3) ==
On the advice of the informateurs, Juliana appointed Den Uyl as formateur for the third time on 26 October. In addition to himself, Van Agt nominated Wilhelm Friedrich de Gaay Fortman (Justice), Kruisinga (Agriculture), Gardeniers (Public Health) and Andriessen (Economic Affairs). For PvdA, both Kruisinga and Andriessen were not acceptable, especially not in Economic Affairs. At the same time there was also a conflict within the CDA, with Ruud Lubbers wanting to be in Economic Affairs. Den Uyl made good use of this by placing Lubbers in Economic Affairs, after which Gardeniers and Kruisinga indicated that they would not become ministers without Andriessen in the cabinet. Under pressure from the KVP, Lubbers sent a letter to Den Uyl in which he indicated that he was not available for this. Van Agt wanted Den Uyl to swallow at least one veto. All his proposals therefore include either Andriessen in Economic Affairs, or both Kruisinga and Andriessen in cabinet or Van Agt in Justice. Den Uyl rejected all these proposals. On 4 November, the CDA parliamentary group said definitively no to the formateur's proposal and gave Den Uyl back his assignment.

== Informateur Van der Grinten ==
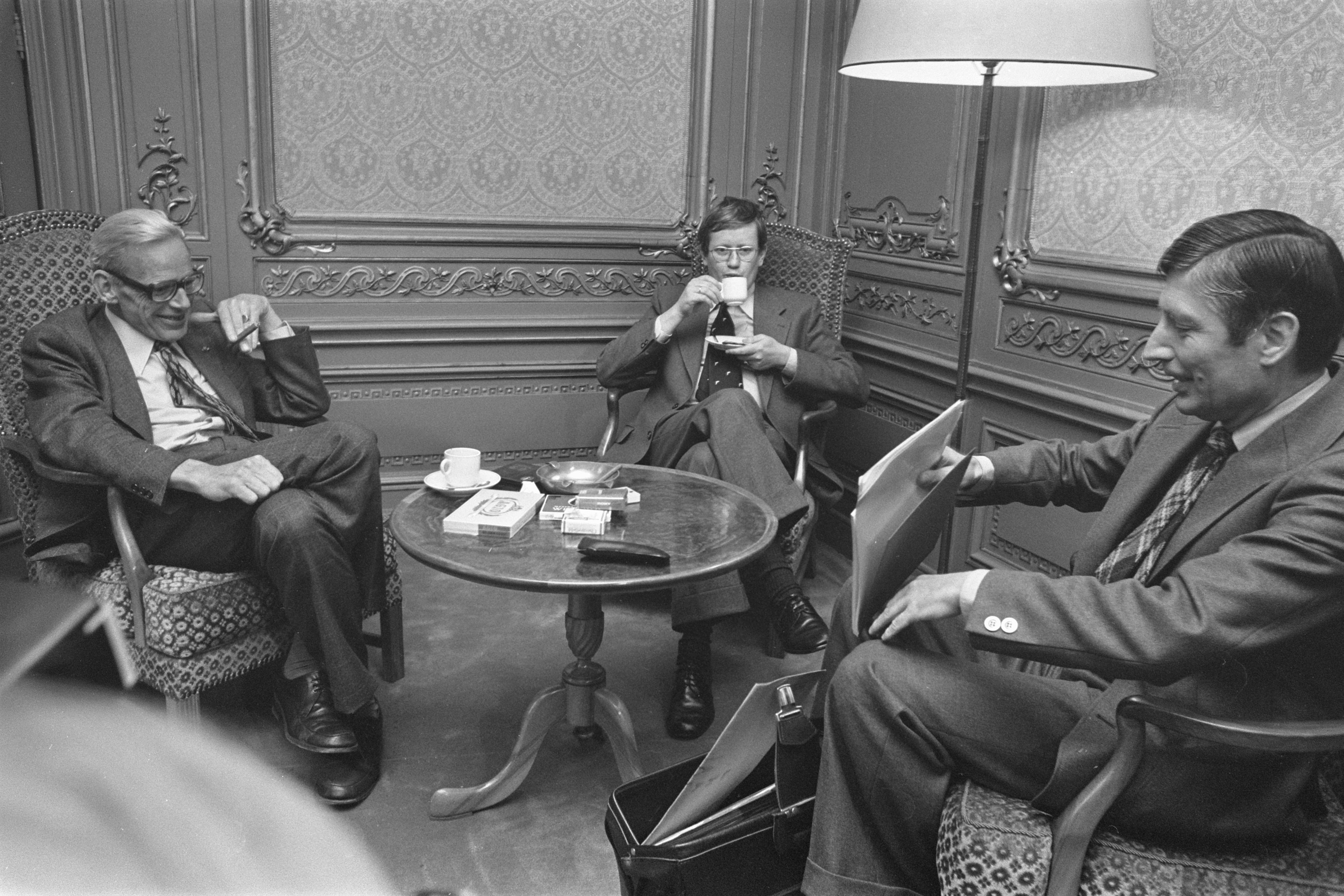
Van der Grinten (l), Wiegel (m) and Van Agt (r)

Informateur Wim van der Grinten explored the possibility of bringing together PvdA, CDA and D'66 without success. The former KVP state secretary was appointed on the recommendation of Van Agt to 'investigate the possibilities of forming a cabinet in the shortest possible time that can be confident of receiving sufficient support from the parliament'. Van der Grinten tried to force a breakthrough with various compromises, but together with the negotiators he concluded that the 'implementation problem' was unsolvable. Van der Grinten then investigated whether PvdA wanted to work with VVD, but Van Thijn rejected this.

The discussions between CDA and VVD subsequently led to an agreement within a week. The conversations between Van Agt and Wiegel started on 14 November. On Wiegel's recommendation, they decided to strive to keep it short and concise. Wiegel's proposal to keep the outside world - including their parliamentary groups - out was also adopted. Even advisor Herman Tjeenk Willink and director of the Government Information Service Gijs van der Wiel, who had always been there until then, were sent away. Already in the first conversation they managed to make agreements about the WIR, the VAD, the works councils and the distribution of ministerial posts. Parts of the agreement with PvdA and D'66 were adopted, such as the abortion paragraph. What helped was the good atmosphere between the party leaders, in contrast to the conversations between Van Agt with Van Thijn and Den Uyl. The draft agreement was sent to the parliamentary groups on 22 November. The VVD quickly agreed, but under pressure from ARP members such as Aantjes and Scholten, dozens of amendments were submitted. Wiegel responded with understanding and an amended agreement was reached on 26 November.

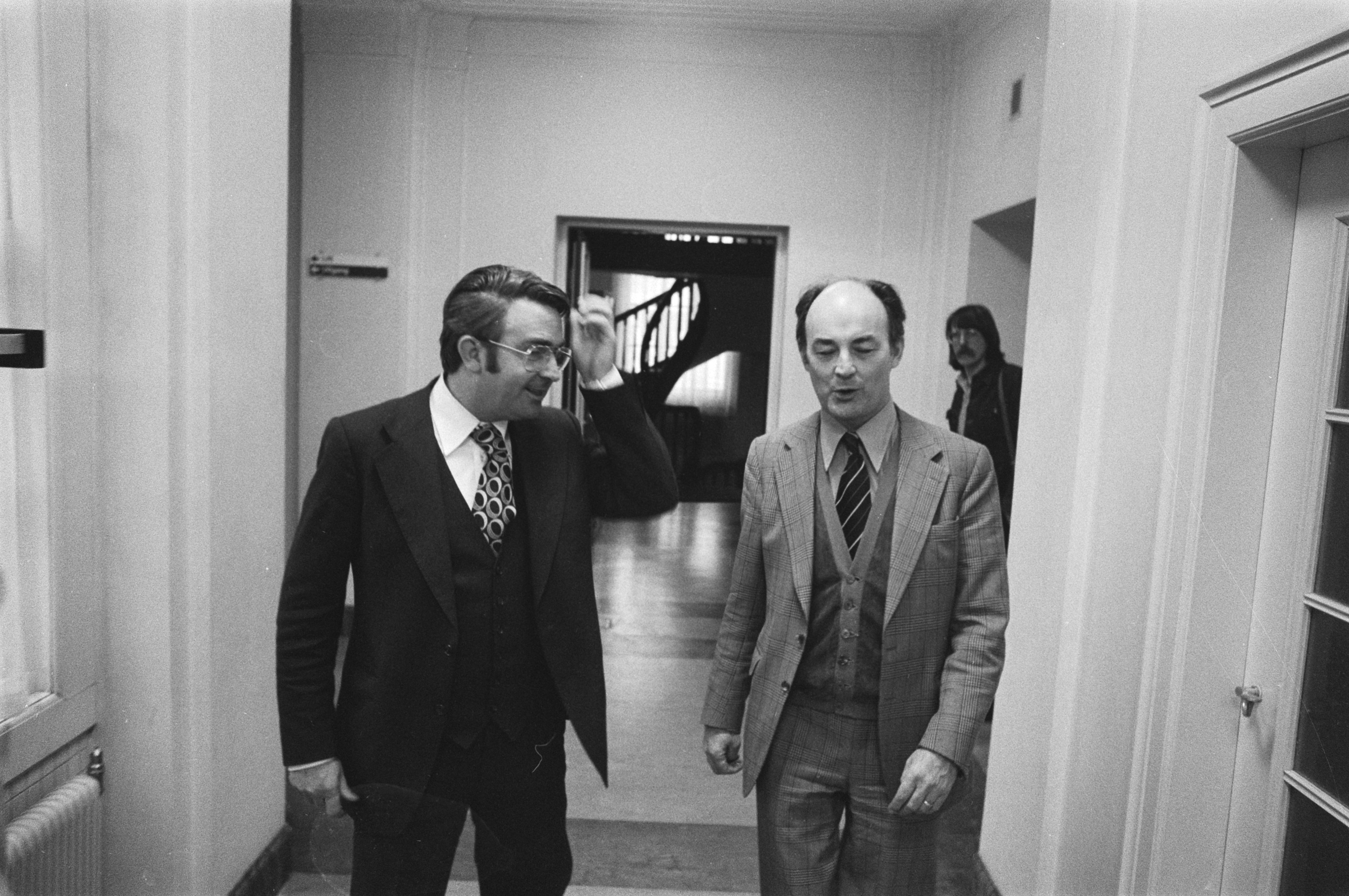
Scholten (l) and Aantjes

The VVD parliamentary group unanimously agreed to the result on 28 November. An extensive consultation took place at the CDA, which continued until the early morning. The majority voted in favor, but six parliamentary group members – Aantjes, Hans de Boer, Beumer, Van Houwelingen, Scholten (all from ARP) and Stef Dijkman (KVP) – voted against. They indicated that they tolerated the cabinet and were known as the CDA loyalists. During a parliamentary group meeting on 5 December Willem de Kwaadsteniet also joined this group. Because of this tolerating support, there was some commotion, because Van der Grinten's assignment was to create a parliamentary majority cabinet. PvdA objected to this, but this had no effect.

On 2 December the parties reached an agreement in principle on the distribution of ministerial posts. Van Agt was the intended Prime Minister, after Jelle Zijlstra, Pierre Lardinois, Jan van den Brink and Roelof Nelissen had resigned. Wiegel was intended as Deputy Prime Minister and Minister of the Interior. Van der Grinten submitted his final report on 6 December.

== Formateur Van Agt ==
Wiegel, Van Agt and the queen's permanent advisors advised to appoint Van Agt as formateur. The Queen asked Van Agt whether he was not prepared to renegotiate with PvdA and D'66, because 110 was a broader base than 77. Van Agt indicated that the vast majority of his parliamentary group was not prepared to do so. When Van Agt was given the formateur's assignment on 8 December the queen was, according to him, "noticeably unhappy", because she feared that his cabinet would be shaky and short-lived.

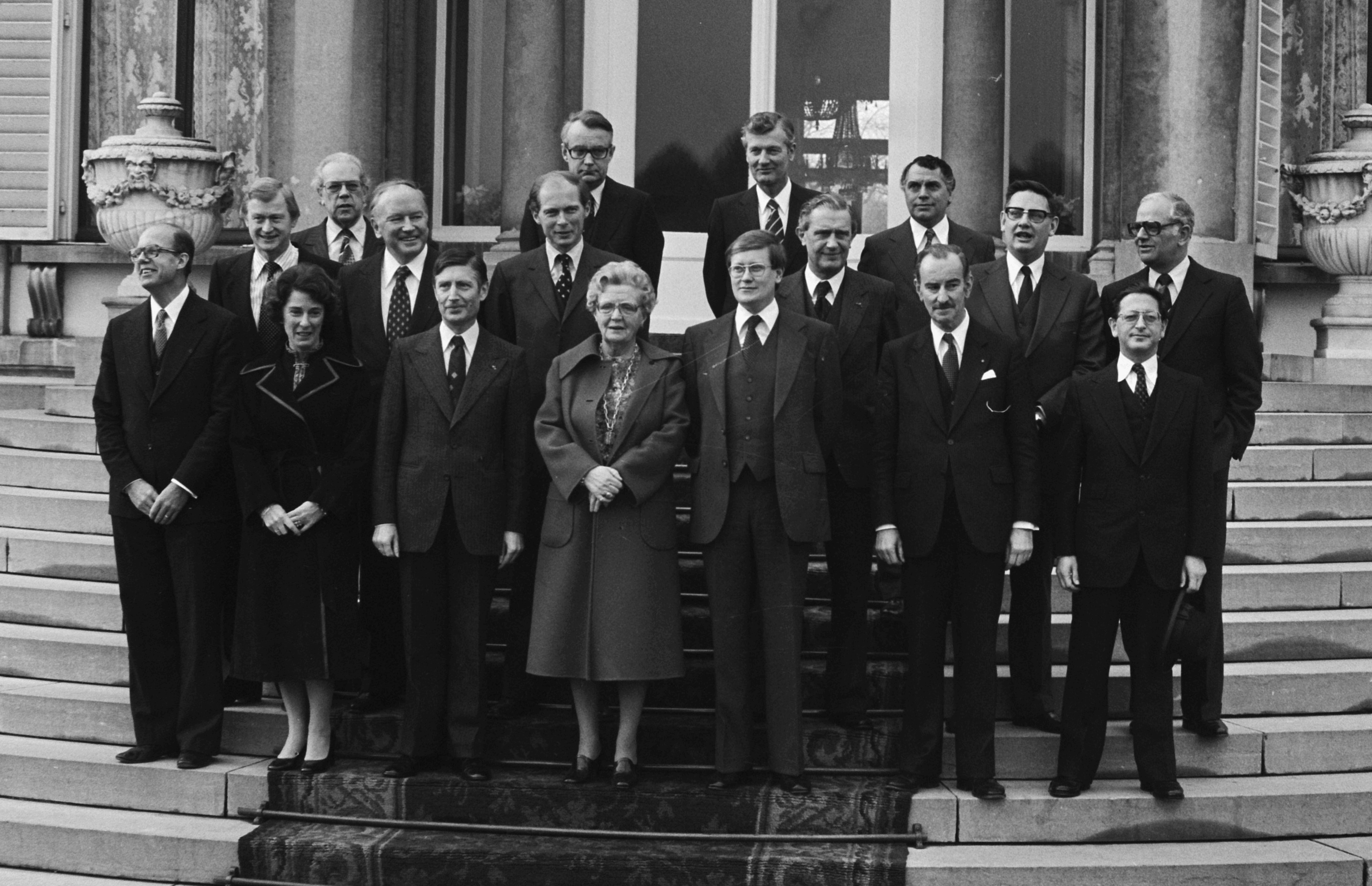
Bordes scene of ministers the Van Agt cabinet together with Queen Juliana

The parties then filled the ministerial positions. At the CDA, Lubbers still wanted Economic Affairs or Finance, but the first went to VVD and the second to Andriessen. He subsequently rejected all other posts, leaving him outside the cabinet. ARP was allowed to supply three ministers, but the first choices of party chairman De Boer – Boersma, Bob Goudzwaard and De Gaay Fortman – withdrew, the latter because of the collaboration with the VVD. Another five ARP members refused the Justice portfolio, after which Job de Ruiter was asked and retroactively made a member of ARP. Finding a Minister of Foreign Affairs was difficult for the VVD. Two candidates, including former parliamentary leader Edzo Toxopeus, refused, after which Wiegel ended up with Chris van der Klaauw. On 17 December the ministers held the constitutive deliberation and on 19 December they were sworn in. The swearing-in of the state secretaries also took place on 28 December. Only State Secretary of Defense Wim van Eekelen followed later, because Minister of Defense had rejected Kruisinga Ad Ploeg for that post.

== Aftermath ==
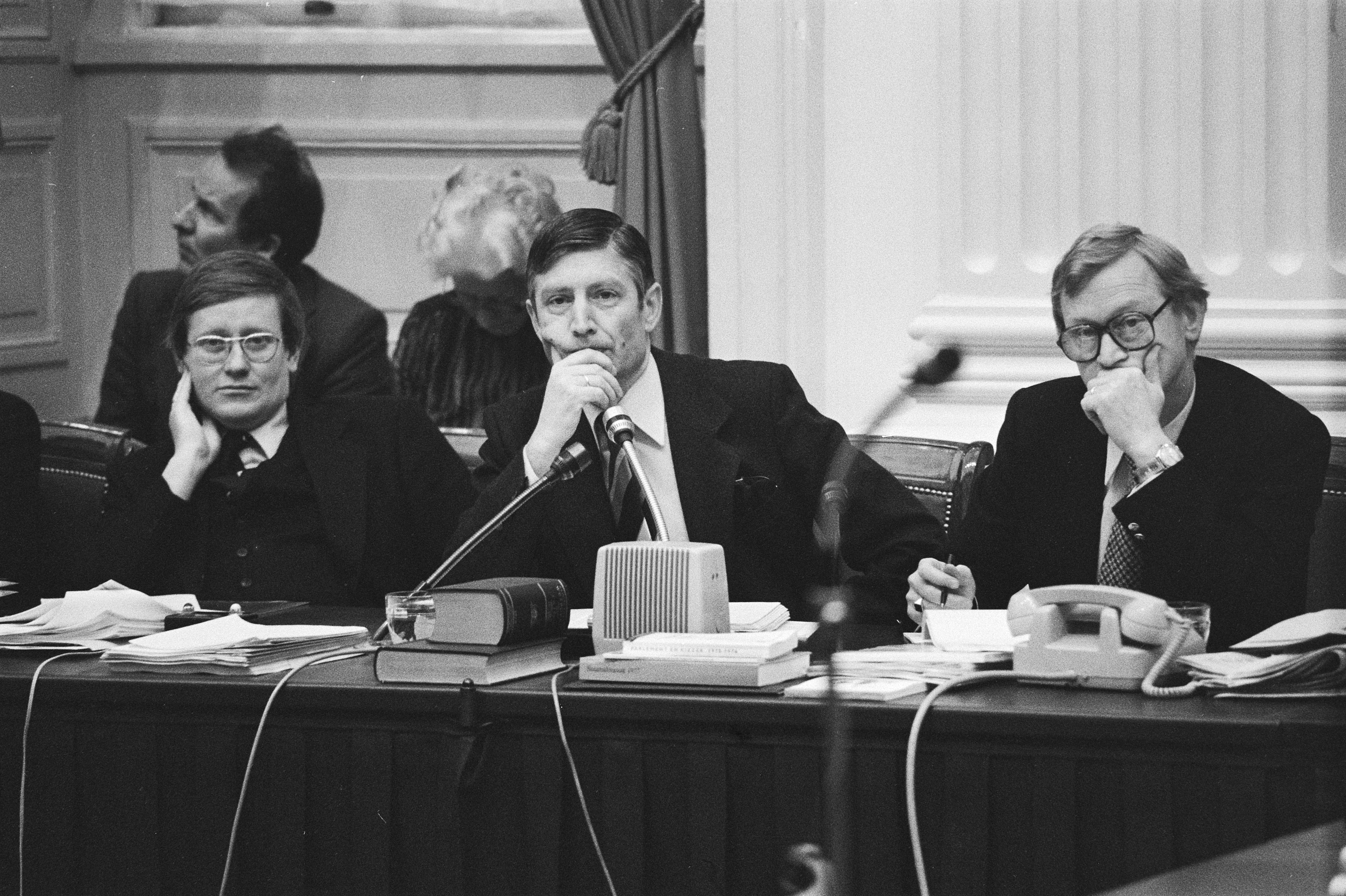
Debate on the government statement. From left to right Wiegel, Van Agt and Andriessen.

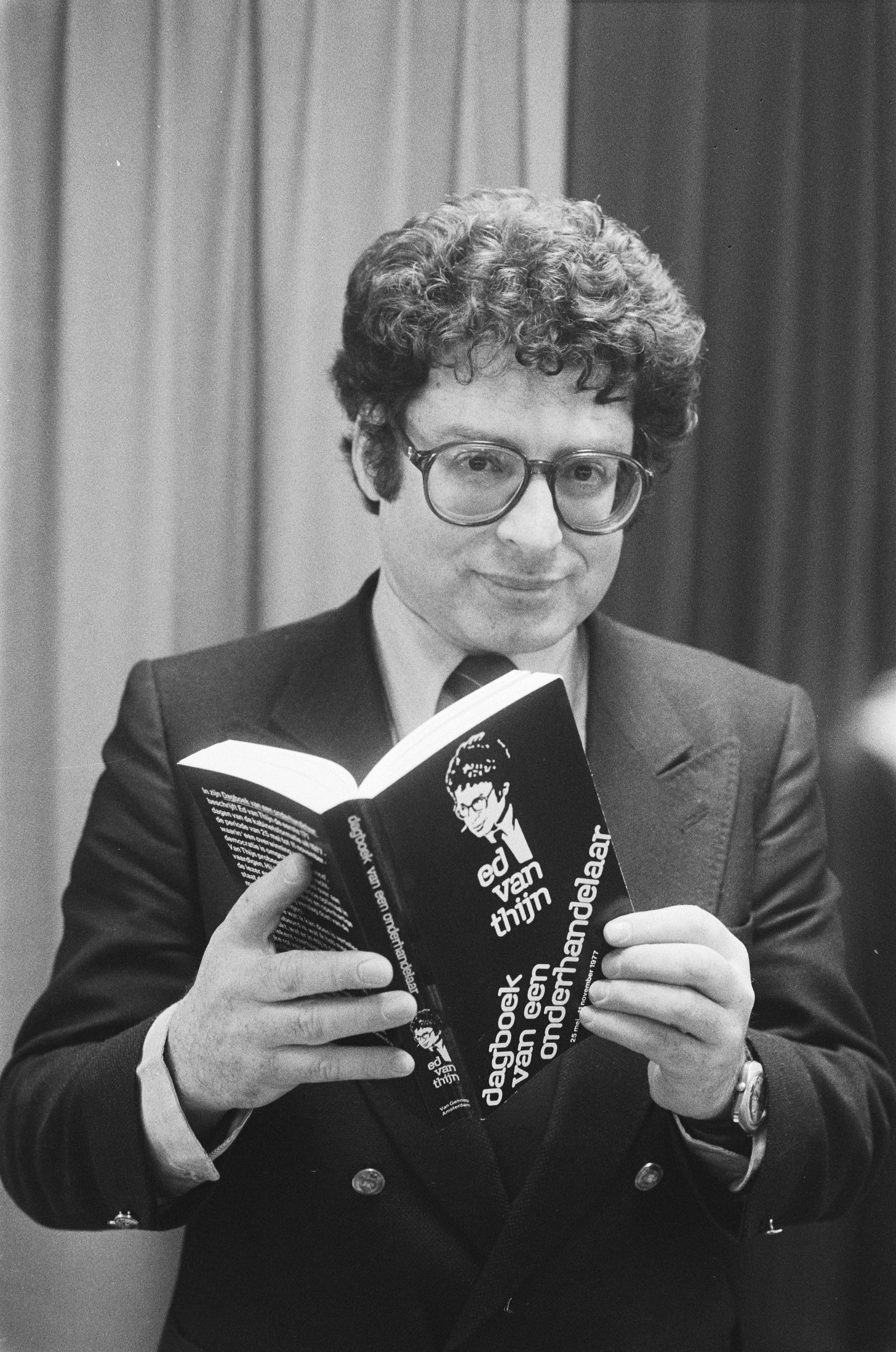
Van Thijn with his Diary of a negotiator that he published after the formation

As a minister, Van Thijn commissioned the Biesheuvel State Commission in 1982 to investigate how the influence of the voter can be increased.

After the formation, a number of (new) parliamentary group members joined the loyalists, although they rarely acted as a bloc. On the other hand, ARP member Hannie van Leeuwen left the House because she felt that the loyalists were not loyal to Van Agt. The cabinet had to constantly consult with loyalists and other critical parliamentary group members to determine whether there was a majority for a position. Occasionally they voted with the opposition, but this did not actually lead to a cabinet crisis. The cabinet completed its term until the 1981 general election.

== Sources ==
- Van Merriënboer, Jan (2016). "De moeder van alles formaties" [The mother of all formations]. In Van Baalen, Carla; Van Kessel, Alexander (eds.). Kabinetsformaties 1977-2012 [Cabinet formations 1977-2012] (PDF) (in Dutch). Amsterdam: Boom. pp. 11–80. ISBN 978-94-6105-466-1. Archived (PDF) from the original on 26 July 2023.
- Sijpersma, Pieter (2020). Hans Wiegel (in Dutch). Atlas Contact. pp. 398–419. ISBN 978-90-450-3825-4.
