= Richard Manning (disambiguation) =

Richard Manning (born 1951) is an American environmental author and journalist.

Richard Manning may also refer to:

== Sports ==
- Rich Manning (born 1970), American basketball player
- Rick Manning (born 1954), American baseball player
- Ricky Manning (born 1980), American football player and coach

== Others ==
- Richard Manning (born 1947), an English freelance illustrator that worked for Hipgnosis
- Brennan Manning (Richard Francis Xavier Manning, 1934–2013), American Roman Catholic priest
- Richard Irvine Manning I (1789–1836), American politician
- Richard Irvine Manning III (1859–1931), American politician
- Richard C. Manning, Australian development expert

== See also ==
- Dick Manning (1912–1991), Russian-American songwriter
- Richard Manning Jefferies (1888–1964), American politician
