= Max van der Stoel =

Dutch politician and diplomat (1924–2011)

His Excellency Max van der Stoel
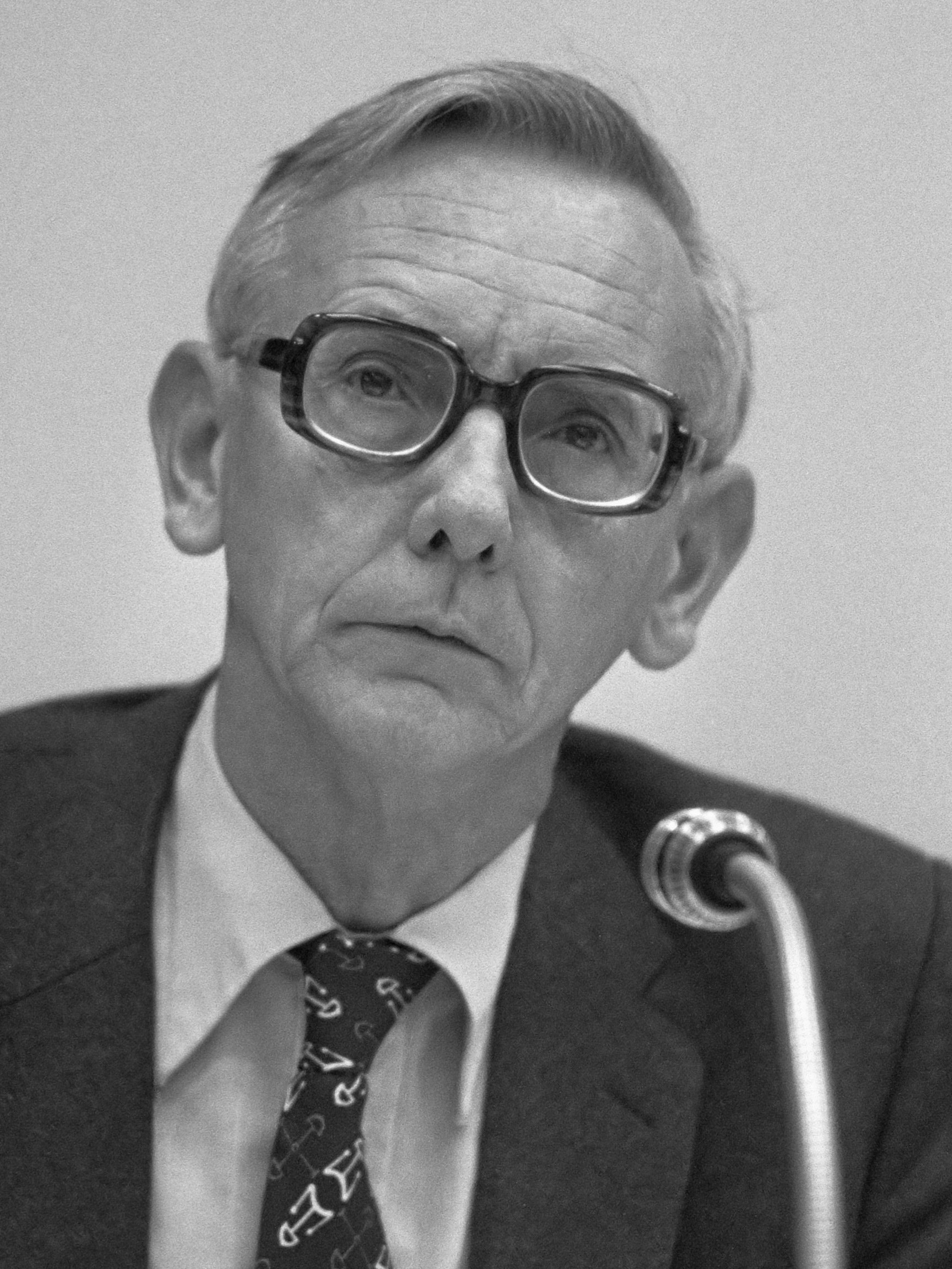
- Van der Stoel in 1981

High Commissioner on National Minorities of the OSCE
- In office 1 January 1993 – 1 July 2001
- Secretary-General: See list: Wilhelm Höynck (1993–1996) Giancarlo Aragona (1996–1999) Ján Kubiš (1999–2001)
- Preceded by: Office established
- Succeeded by: Rolf Ekeus

Member of the Council of State
- In office 1 August 1986 – 1 January 1993
- Vice President: Willem Scholten

Ambassador to the United Nations
- In office 1 July 1983 – 1 August 1986
- Preceded by: Hugo Scheltema
- Succeeded by: Peter van Walsum

Minister of Foreign Affairs
- In office 11 September 1981 – 29 May 1982
- Prime Minister: Dries van Agt
- Preceded by: Chris van der Klaauw
- Succeeded by: Dries van Agt
- In office 11 May 1973 – 19 December 1977
- Prime Minister: Joop den Uyl
- Preceded by: Norbert Schmelzer
- Succeeded by: Chris van der Klaauw

Member of the European Parliament
- In office 22 September 1971 – 11 May 1973
- Parliamentary group: Socialist Group
- Constituency: Netherlands

State Secretary for Foreign Affairs
- In office 22 July 1965 – 22 November 1966 Serving with Leo de Block
- Prime Minister: Jo Cals
- Preceded by: Isaäc Nicolaas; Diepenhorst
- Succeeded by: Leo de Block

Member of the House of Representatives
- In office 16 January 1978 – 11 September 1981
- In office 8 June 1977 – 8 September 1977
- In office 23 February 1967 – 11 May 1973
- In office 5 June 1963 – 22 July 1965
- Parliamentary group: Labour Party

Member of the Senate
- In office 27 September 1960 – 5 June 1963
- Parliamentary group: Labour Party

Personal details
- Born: Maximilianus van der Stoel; 3 August 1924 Voorschoten, Netherlands
- Died: 23 April 2011 (aged 86) The Hague, Netherlands
- Party: Labour Party (from 1950)
- Spouse: Maria Aritia de Kanter (m. 1953; div. 1976)
- Children: 4 daughters and 1 son
- Education: Leiden University (LL.B., B.Soc.Sc, LL.M., MSS)
- Occupation: Politician; diplomat; civil servant; jurist; researcher; nonprofit director; lobbyist; activist; author; professor
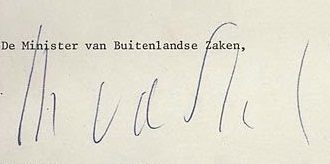
- Signature

Maximilianus "Max" van der Stoel (Dutch pronunciation: [mɑks(imiliˈjaːnʏs) fɑn dər ˈstul]; (Note: In isolation, van is pronounced [vɑn].) 3 August 1924 – 23 April 2011) was a Dutch politician and diplomat, member of the Labour Party (PvdA) and activist who served as High Commissioner on National Minorities of the OSCE from 1 January 1993 until 1 July 2001.

Van der Stoel studied Law at the Leiden University obtaining a Master of Laws degree followed by a postgraduate education in Sociology at his alma mater obtaining a Master of Social Science degree. Van der Stoel worked as a researcher at the Wiardi Beckman Foundation from April 1953 until August 1958 and for the Labour Party party board from June 1958 until July 1965. After the Senate election of 1960 Van der Stoel was elected as a Member of the Senate on 27 September 1960 serving as a frontbencher and spokesperson for Foreign Affairs. After the election of 1963 Van der Stoel was elected as a member of the House of Representatives on 5 June 1963 and served as a frontbencher and spokesperson for Foreign Affairs. Van der Stoel was appointed as State Secretary for Foreign Affairs in the Cabinet Cals taking office on 22 July 1965. The Cabinet Cals fell just one year into its term after the Night of Schmelzer and was replaced on 22 November 1966. After the election of 1967 Van der Stoel returned to the House of House of Representatives on 23 February 1967 and again served as a frontbencher and spokesperson for Foreign Affairs. After the election of 1972 Van der Stoel was appointed as Minister of Foreign Affairs in the Cabinet Den Uyl, taking office on 11 May 1973. The Cabinet Den Uyl fell just before the end of its term. After the election of 1977 Van der Stoel returned to the House of Representatives serving from 8 June 1977 until 8 September 1977 and again from 16 January 1978 serving as a frontbencher chairing the House Committee on Foreign Affairs and spokesperson for European Affairs. After the election of 1981 Van der Stoel was appointed again as Minister of Foreign Affairs in the Cabinet Van Agt II taking office on 11 September 1981. The Cabinet Van Agt II fell just seven months into its term and was replaced with the caretaker Cabinet Van Agt III on 29 May 1982. Shortly thereafter Van der Stoel announced that he wouldn't stand for the election of 1982.

Van der Stoel continued to be active in politics and in June 1983 he was nominated as the next Ambassador to the United Nations serving from 1 July 1983 until 1 August 1986 when he was appointed as a Member of the Council of State serving until 1 January 1993. In December 1992 Van der Stoel was nominated as the first High Commissioner on National Minorities of the OSCE serving from 1 January 1993 until 1 July 2001. Van der Stoel also became active as a diplomat for the United Nations, serving as an expert on Human rights.

Van der Stoel retired from active politics at 76 and became active in the public sector as a non-profit director and served on several state commissions and councils on behalf of the government and as an occasional diplomat for and diplomatic delegations, and worked as a distinguished professor of Peace and conflict studies, Minority rights and International relations at his alma mater from April 1999 until April 2000 and as distinguished visiting professor of International and European law at the Tilburg University from January 2001 until January 2003. Following his retirement Van der Stoel continued to be active as an advocate and activist for the Human rights and Minority rights. Van der Stoel was known for his abilities as a skillful negotiator and effective mediator. Van der Stoel was granted the honorary title of Minister of State on 17 May 1991 and continued to comment on political affairs until his death in April 2011 at the age of 86.

In 2013, the PvdA-associated Foundation Max van der Stoel (FMS), which promotes international solidarity, human rights and democracy among other things, was named after Van der Stoel.

== Biography ==
=== Early life and career ===
Van der Stoel attended the Gymnasium Leiden from June 1937 until June 1943, and applied at the Leiden University in June 1943 majoring in Law and obtaining a Bachelor of Laws degree in December 1945 before graduating with a Master of Laws degree in July 1947. Van der Stoel continued to study at the Leiden University for a postgraduate education in Sociology and worked as a student researcher before obtaining a Bachelor of Social Science degree June 1947 and a Master of Social Science degree in July 1953. Van der Stoel worked as a researcher for the Wiardi Beckman Foundation, the scientific bureau of the Partij van de Arbeid (PvdA, the Dutch labour party), from August 1953 until April 1958 and as a political consultant for the Labour Party from April 1958 until July 1965.

Van der Stoel was elected as a Member of the Senate following the Senate election of 1960, serving from 27 September 1960 until 5 June 1963. That year, he became international secretary for the PvdA .

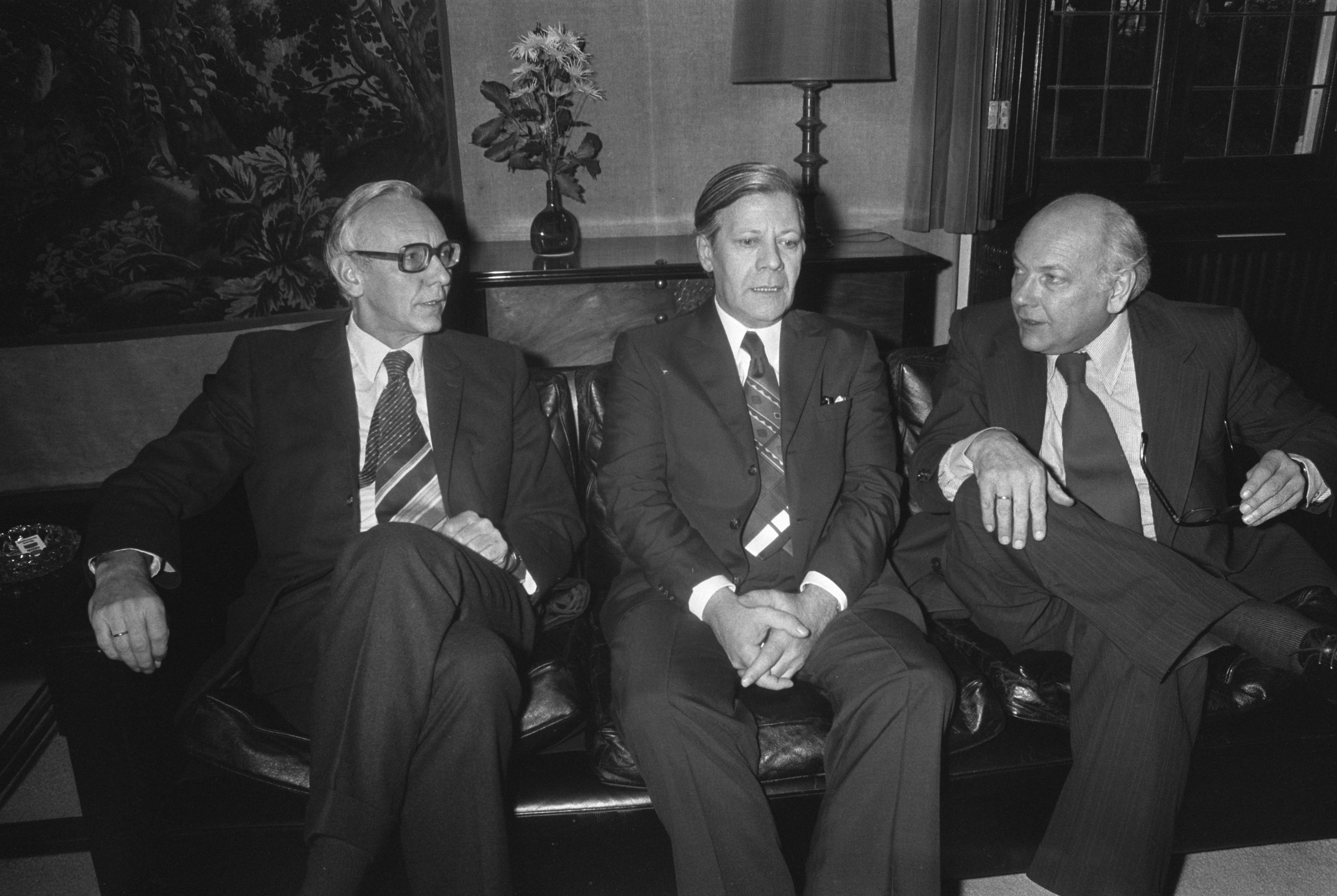
Minister of Foreign Affairs Max van der Stoel, Chancellor of West-Germany Helmut Schmidt and Prime Minister Joop den Uyl during a meeting at the Catshuis on 2 November 1974.

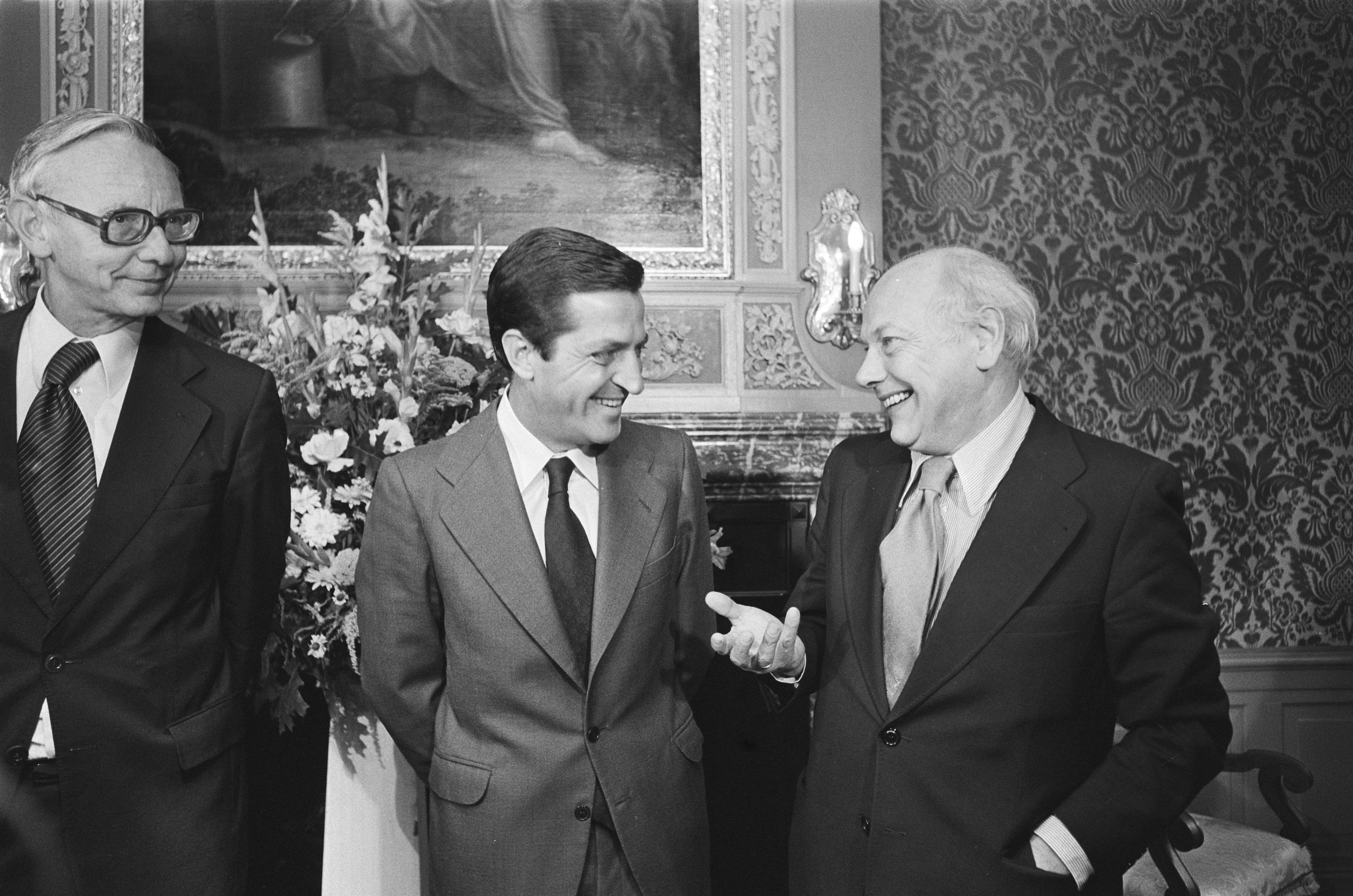
Minister of Foreign Affairs Max van der Stoel, Prime Minister of Spain Adolfo Suárez and Prime Minister Joop den Uyl during a meeting at the Catshuis on 29 August 1977.

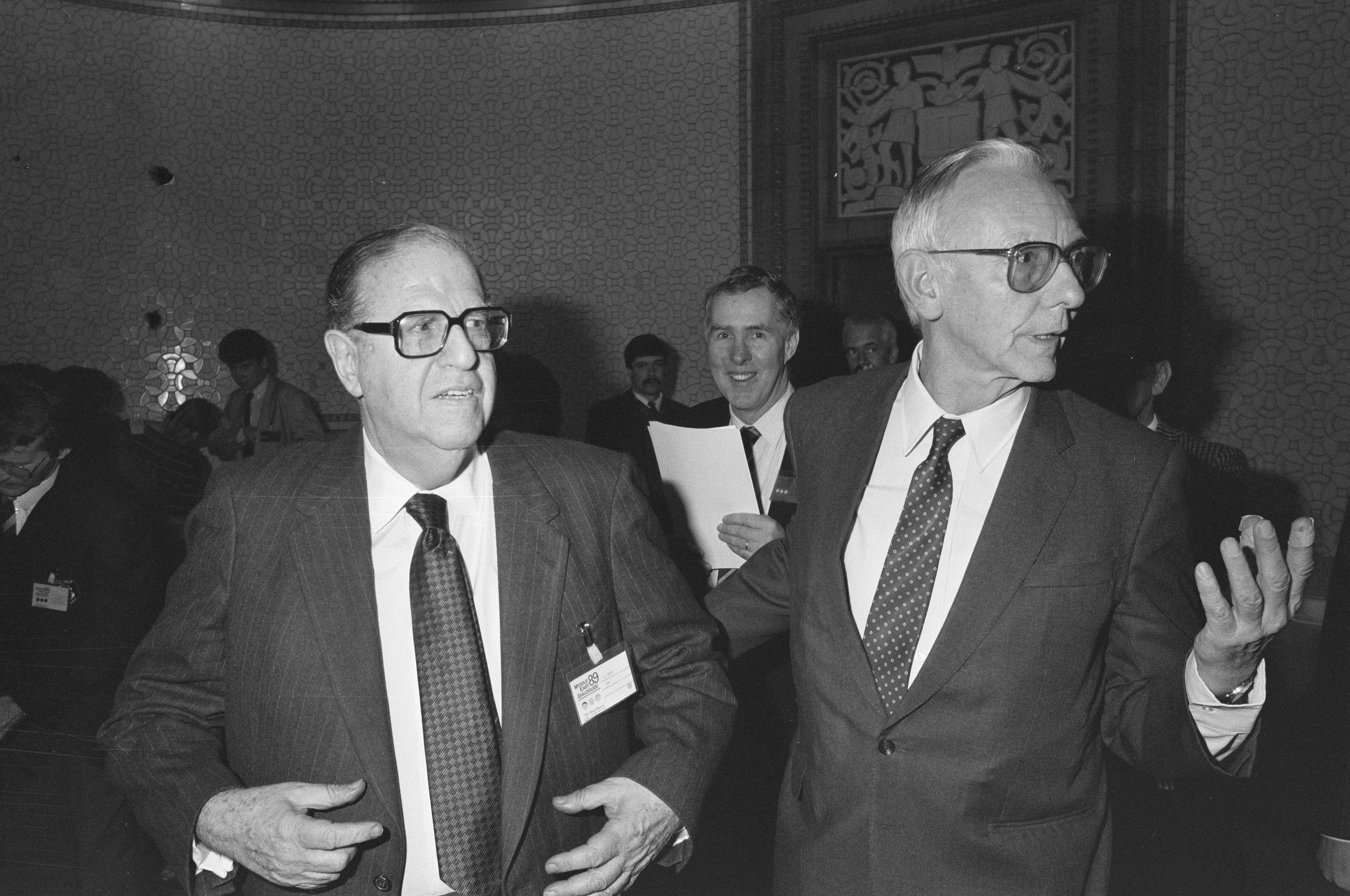
Former Foreign Affairs Minister of Israel Abba Eban with Max van der Stoel, 1989

=== Politics ===
From 1973 to 1977 and 1981 to 1982 he was the Netherlands Minister of Foreign Affairs. In the 1973 October War when Egypt and Syria attacked Israel, van der Stoel took a highly pro-Israeli position and was regarded as the most pro-Israeli foreign minister in Europe. To punish the Dutch for their pro-Israel stance, the Arab nations led by Saudi Arabia placed a total oil embargo on shipping oil to the Netherlands, which was one of the nations most affected by the 1973 oil shock. In 1977, during his visit to communist Czechoslovakia, he met with philosopher and dissident Jan Patočka, and they discussed Charter 77 and human rights in Czechoslovakia. This provoked harsh criticism by the Czechoslovak authorities and president Gustáv Husák cancelled scheduled meeting with van der Stoel.

In 2001, following his intervention as High Commissioner in the ongoing problem of equitable access to higher education by members of the Albanian ethnic group in the Republic of Macedonia, he became the founding president of the International Foundation for the South East European University, raising some €35 million from the international community. He later served as president of the university board until 2004. He was awarded the university's first honorary doctorate and the university named its Library and its Research Institute in his honour.

Van der Stoel was a member of the advisory board of the European Association of History Educators (EuroClio).

=== Freedom awards ===
- Freedom of Speech of the Four Freedoms Award (1982)
- Helène de Montigny award (December 1991)
- Dr. J.P. van Praag award (1 June 1993, Netherlands)
- Geuzenpenning (1993, Netherlands)
- Wateler Peace award (30 oktober 1996)

=== Honorary degrees ===
- Honorary doctorate in law, University of Athens (1977, Greece)
- Honorary doctorate in law, Utrecht University (1994, Netherlands)
- Honorary doctorate in law, Pázmány Péter Catholic University (1999, Hungary)
- Honorary Doctor, South East European University (2005, Republic of Macedonia)

=== Other ===
- In 2014, a new park in Prague (in Jan Patočka street) was named in van der Stoel's honour. In 2017, forty years after his meeting with Jan Patočka, Van der Stoel's memorial created by Dominik Lang was unveiled in the park.

== Decorations ==
Honours
Ribbon bar	Honour	Country	Date	Comment
	Knight of the Order of the Netherlands Lion	Netherlands	5 December 1966	
	Grand Officer of the Legion of Honour	France	25 Augustus 1973	
	Grand Cross of the Order of the Crown	Belgium	15 March 1974	
	Honorary Medal for Initiative and Ingenuity of the Order of the House of Orange	Netherlands	19 September 1974	
	Grand Cross of the Order of Merit	Germany	1975	
	Grand Cross of the Order of Merit	Portugal	1975	
	Grand Officer of the Honorary Order of the Palm	Suriname	4 September 1977	
	Grand Cross of the Order of the Phoenix	Greece	10 December 1977	
	Knight Grand Cross of the Order of Isabella the Catholic	Spain	1981	
	Grand Cross of the Order of Leopold	Belgium	10 January 1982	
	Grand Officer of the Order of Orange-Nassau	Netherlands	9 September 1982	Elevated from Commander (11 April 1978)
	Second Class of the Order of Tomáš Garrigue Masaryk	Czech Republic	15 May 1996	
	Knight of the Order of the Gold Lion of the House of Nassau	Netherlands / Luxembourg	31 August 1999	
	Grand Officer of the Order of the Star of Romania	Romania	2000	
	Grand Cross of the Order of the White Double Cross	Slovakia	5 February 2001	
	Fourth Class of the Order of Prince Yaroslav the Wise	Ukraine	30 September 2001	
	Honorary Knight Grand Cross of the Order of St Michael and St George	United Kingdom	1 December 2006	

Awards
Ribbon bar	Awards	Organization	Date	Comment
	Four Freedoms Award	Roosevelt Institute for American Studies	1982	
	Geuzenpenning	Vlaardingen	1993	

Honorific Titles
Ribbon bar	Honour	Country	Date	Comment
	Minister of State	Netherlands	17 May 1991	Style of Excellency

== Honorary degrees ==
Honorary degrees
University	Field	Country	Date	Comment
University of Athens	Law	Greece	1977	
Utrecht University	Law	Netherlands	1994	
Tilburg University	Law	Netherlands	2003	

== Books ==
- Lacey, Robert (1981). The Kingdom. New York: Harcout Brace Jovanovich.

Political offices
Preceded by Isaäc Nicolaas; Diepenhorst	State Secretary for Foreign Affairs; 1965–1966; Served alongside: Leo de Block	Succeeded by Leo de Block
Preceded by Norbert Schmelzer	Minister of Foreign Affairs; 1973–1977; 1981–1982	Succeeded by Chris van der Klaauw
Preceded by Chris van der Klaauw	Minister of Foreign Affairs; 1973–1977; 1981–1982	Succeeded by Dries van Agt
Diplomatic posts
Preceded by Hugo Scheltema	Permanent Representative of the Netherlands to the United Nations; 1983–1986	Succeeded by Peter van Walsum
Preceded by Office established	High Commissioner on National; Minorities of the OSCE; 1993–2001	Succeeded by Rolf Ekeus
