= CDA loyalists =

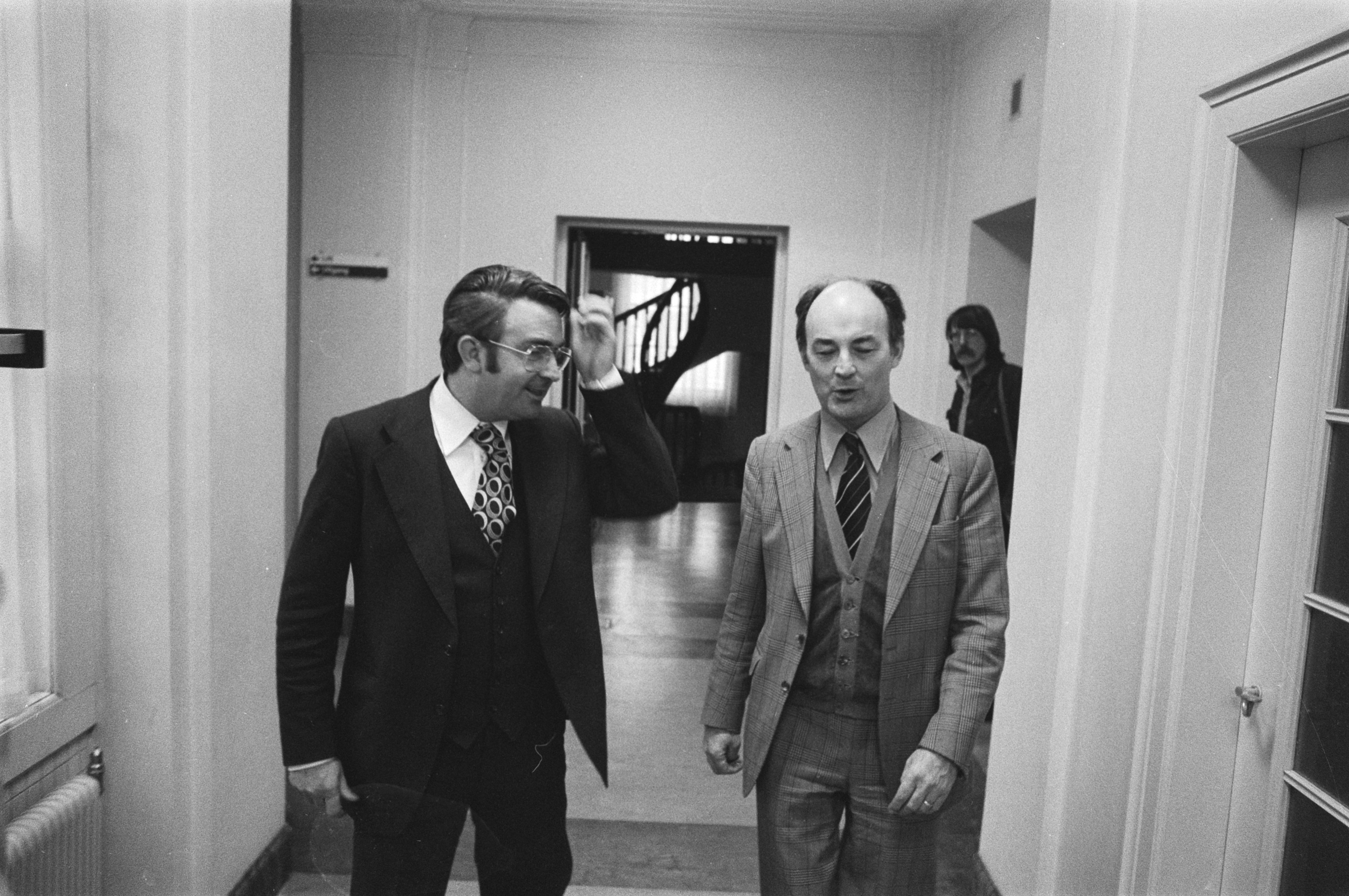
Loyalists Jan Nico Scholten (l) and Willem Aantjes during the 1977 cabinet formation.

The CDA loyalists were a group of relatively progressive members of the Dutch House of Representatives for the Christian Democratic Appeal (CDA) who were skeptical of the first Van Agt cabinet (1977–1981), which comprised the CDA and the conservative liberal People's Party for Freedom and Democracy (VVD). At the end of the 1977 cabinet formation, which had started with unsuccessful negotiations between CDA and the socialist Labour Party (PvdA), they voted against the coalition agreement between the VVD and the CDA. Although they voted against the agreement, they were willing to loyally support the cabinet, hence the name. These loyalists had an influential position during the cabinet period, because the cabinet only had a majority of 77 out of 150 seats including them.

On issues such as income policy, nuclear energy, nuclear armament, and policies related to the apartheid regime in South Africa, the cabinet would have to negotiate with the loyalists. At times, some loyalists voted against the Van Agt cabinet. Nevertheless, it never resulted in a cabinet crisis and the cabinet was able to complete its term.

== Members ==
The original loyalists were Bouke Beumer, Hans de Boer, Jan van Houwelingen, Stef Dijkman and CDA parliamentary leader Wim Aantjes, because they had voted against the agreement within their parliamentary group meeting on 29 November 1977. On 5 December 1977, Willem de Kwaadsteniet also joined the group during the formation. Informally, the term also referred to members who joined the House later: Marten Beinema, Fred Borgman, Henk Couprie and Jan Buikema.

The CDA was officially still a federation of Catholic People's Party (KVP), the Anti-Revolutionary Party (ARP) and the Christian Historical Union (CHU). Other than Dijkman, all came from the more progressive ARP.
