= Haydée Martínez de Osorio =

Venezuelan UN official

Chairman of UNICEF
- In office 1983–1984
- Preceded by: Hugo Scheltema
- Succeeded by: Richard C. Manning

Haydée Martínez de Osorio is a Venezuelan United Nations official and a former chairman of UNICEF (1983–1984). She was Director-General of the National Institute for Children in Venezuela and was formerly the UNICEF Area Representative for Argentina, Chile and Uruguay.
