= Richard C. Manning =

Australian development expert

Chairman of UNICEF
- In office 1984–1985
- Preceded by: Haydée Martínez de Osorio
- Succeeded by: Anwarul Karim Chowdhury

Richard C. Manning is an Australian development expert. He served as Chairman of UNICEF from 1984 to 1985.

Manning has worked at the World Bank, served as a senior officer of the Australian Development Assistance Bureau, and was Executive Secretary of the Committee to Review the Australian Aid Program. He has worked on development projects in Latin America and Asia. He was Chairman of the UNlCEF Committee on Administration and Finance 1981–1982, Vice Chairman of the Executive Board 1983–1984 and Chairman 1984–1985. He has also been a visiting fellow at the Development Studies Centre of the Australian National University.
