= Hugo Scheltema =

Dutch diplomat (1918–1996)

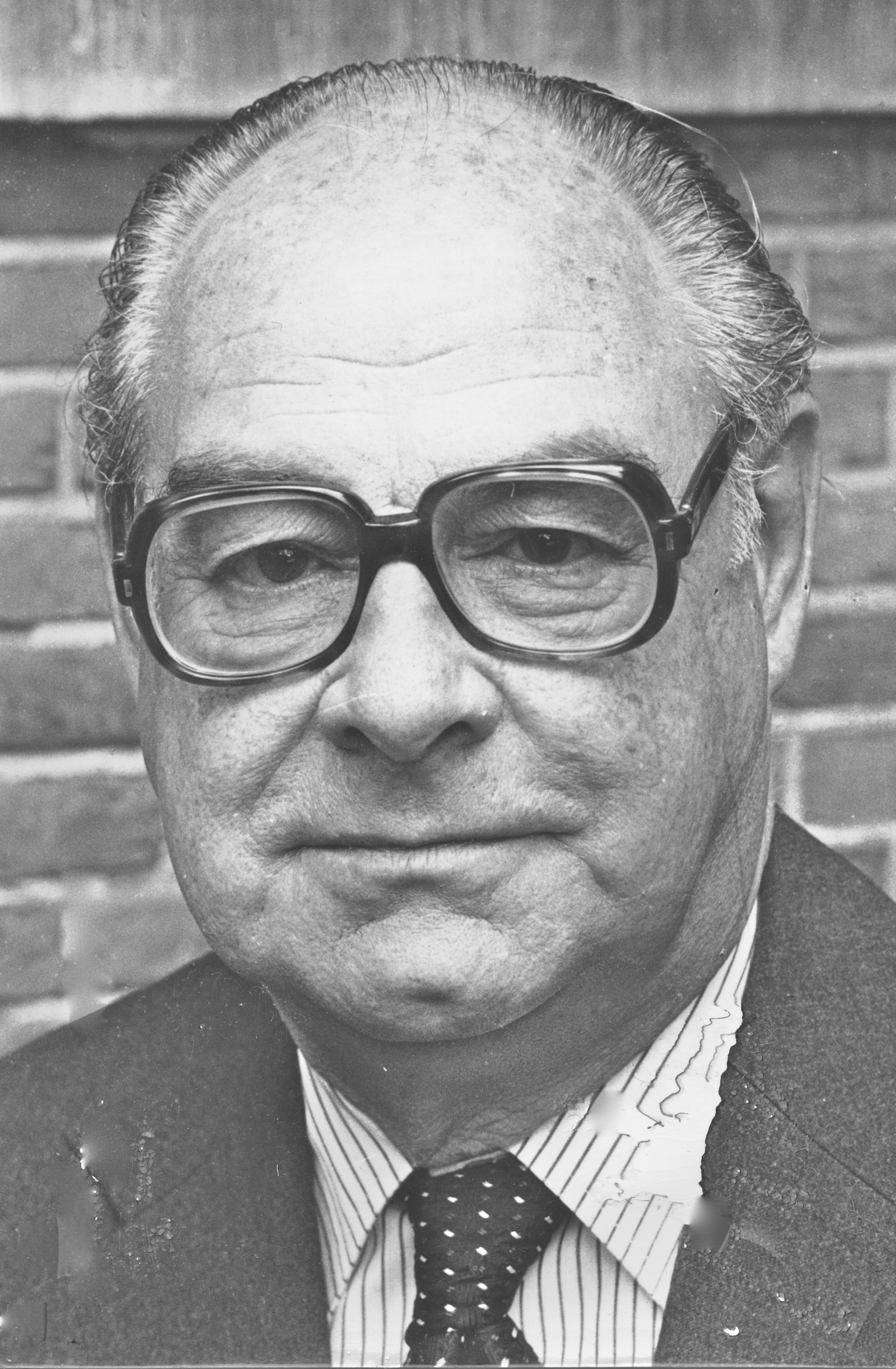

Chairman of UNICEF
- In office 1982–1983
- Preceded by: Dragan Matelijak
- Succeeded by: Haydée Martínez de Osorio

Personal details
- Born: 11 June 1918
- Died: 1 September 1996 (aged 78)
- Profession: diplomat

Hugo Scheltema (11 June 1918 – 1 September 1996) was a Dutch diplomat. He served as Permanent Representative to the United Nations in New York, as Chairman of the United Nations Economic and Social Council in 1979 and as Chairman of UNICEF from 1982 to 1983. He was also Ambassador to Iraq, Indonesia and Belgium earlier in his career.

He was a son of the tobacco merchant Hugo Scheltema (1890–1939). He studied law and joined the diplomatic service in 1945, and was posted to China for several years.
