= Wiel Bremen =

Dutch politician (1925–2014)

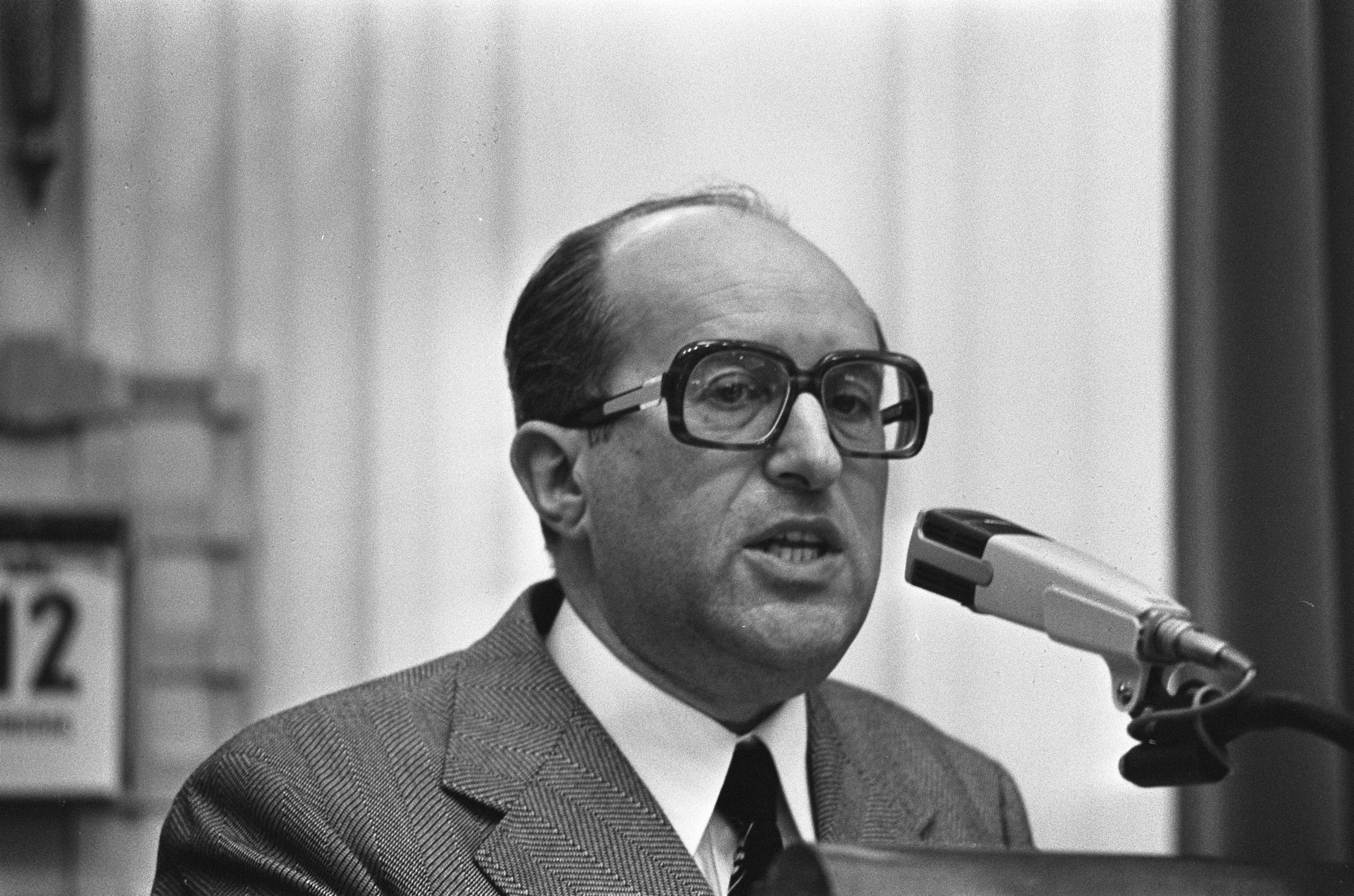
- Wiel Bremen during a parliamentary debate

Member of the House of Representatives
- In office 11 May 1971 – 10 June 1981

Member of the States of Limburg
- In office 3 June 1970 – November 1973

Personal details
- Born: 17 July 1925 Kerkrade, Netherlands
- Died: 24 February 2014 (aged 88) Maastricht, Netherlands
- Party: Catholic People's Party (until 1980), Christian Democratic Appeal (from 1980)

Willem Godfried (Wiel) Bremen (17 July 1925 – 24 February 2014) was a Dutch politician, he served at different times as a member of the States of Limburg, and House of Representatives of the Netherlands between 1970 and 1981. He was member of the Catholic People's Party, and after its merger in 1980 the Christian Democratic Appeal.

== Career ==
Bremen was born on 17 July 1925 in Kerkrade, the son of a mineworker. He followed the steps of his father and started working in the mining industry in 1944. Bremen started his political career on 4 September 1962 when he became member of the municipal council of Kerkrade. On 10 November 1964 he concurrently became alderman for public works and city development. His municipal positions both ended in January 1972. Some years earlier, in June 1970 Wiel became member of the States of Limburg. He was member for three years, until 1973.

In the general election of 1971 Bremen was elected to the House of Representatives for the Catholic People's Party. In 1972 he was candidate to be part of the Provincial-Executive of Limburg, but his party, the Catholic People's Party of Limburg, saw him as too important of voice of Limburg to lose in the House of Representatives. His membership of the House of Representatives ended on 10 June 1981. Between August 1980 and 1 January 1982 he was acting mayor of Geulle, on that latter date the municipality was merged into Meerssen.

On 29 April 1987 he was made Officer in the Order of Orange-Nassau.

He died on 24 February 2014 in Maastricht.
