= Chris van der Klaauw =

Dutch politician and diplomat (1924–2005)

His Excellency Chris van der Klaauw
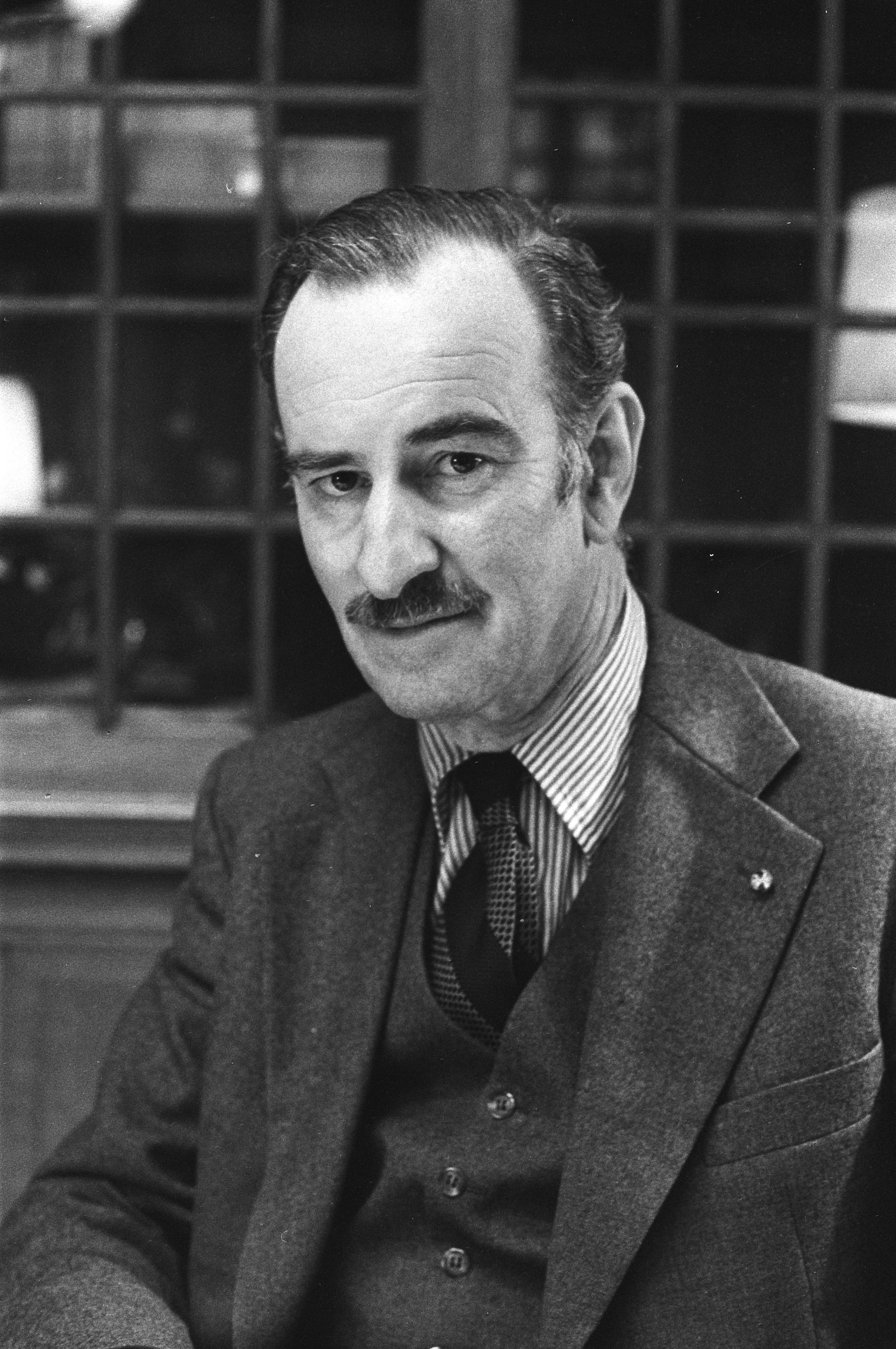
- Chris van der Klaauw in 1977

Ambassador of the Netherlands to Portugal
- In office 1 August 1986 – 1 September 1989
- Preceded by: Leopold Quarles van Ufford
- Succeeded by: Unknown

Ambassador of the Netherlands to Belgium
- In office 1 January 1982 – 1 August 1986
- Preceded by: Unknown
- Succeeded by: H.M.S Schaapveld

Permanent Representative of the Netherlands to the European Union
- In office 1 January 1982 – 1 August 1986
- Preceded by: Unknown
- Succeeded by: Unknown

Minister of Foreign Affairs
- In office 19 December 1977 – 11 September 1981
- Prime Minister: Dries van Agt
- Preceded by: Max van der Stoel
- Succeeded by: Max van der Stoel

Permanent Representative of the Netherlands to NATO
- In office 1 January 1975 – 19 December 1977
- Preceded by: Unknown
- Succeeded by: Unknown

Personal details
- Born: Christoph Albert van der Klaauw; 13 August 1924 Leiden, Netherlands
- Died: 16 March 2005 (aged 80) The Hague, Netherlands
- Party: People's Party for Freedom and Democracy
- Spouses: Henriette van Everdingen (m. 1952; died 1988) Leontine van Noort (m. 1989)
- Children: Tineke van der Klaauw; Jan Willem van der Klaauw; Ida van der Klaauw; Caroline van der Klaauw; Maarten van der Klaauw
- Education: Leiden University (Bachelor of Arts, Master of Arts, Doctor of Philosophy)
- Occupation: Politician · Diplomat · Civil servant · Historian

Christoph Albert "Chris" van der Klaauw (Dutch pronunciation: [ˈkrɪstɔf ˈɑlbərt ˈkrɪs fɑn dər ˈklʌu]; (Note: In isolation, van is pronounced [vɑn].) 13 August 1924 – 16 March 2005) was a Dutch politician and diplomat of the People's Party for Freedom and Democracy (VVD).

From 19 December 1977 to 11 Septembter 1981, he was Minister of Foreign Affairs in the first Van Agt cabinet. He then became the Dutch ambassador to Belgium (1982–1986) and Portugal (1986–1989).

== Decorations ==
Honours
Ribbon bar	Honour	Country	Date	Comment
	Knight of the Order of the Netherlands Lion	Netherlands	26 October 1981	
	Commander of the Order of Orange-Nassau	Netherlands	1 September 1989	

== Notes ==
Political offices
Preceded by Max van der Stoel	Minister of Foreign Affairs; 1977–1981	Succeeded by Max van der Stoel
Diplomatic posts
Unknown	Permanent Representative of the Netherlands to NATO; 1975–1977	Unknown
Unknown	Permanent Representative of the Netherlands to the European Union; 1982–1986	Unknown
Unknown	Ambassador of the Netherlands to Belgium; 1982–1986	Succeeded by H.M.S Schaapveld
Preceded by Leopold Quarles van Ufford	Ambassador of the Netherlands to Portugal; 1986–1989	Unknown
