= 1981 Dutch cabinet formation =

Formation of the second Van Agt cabinet

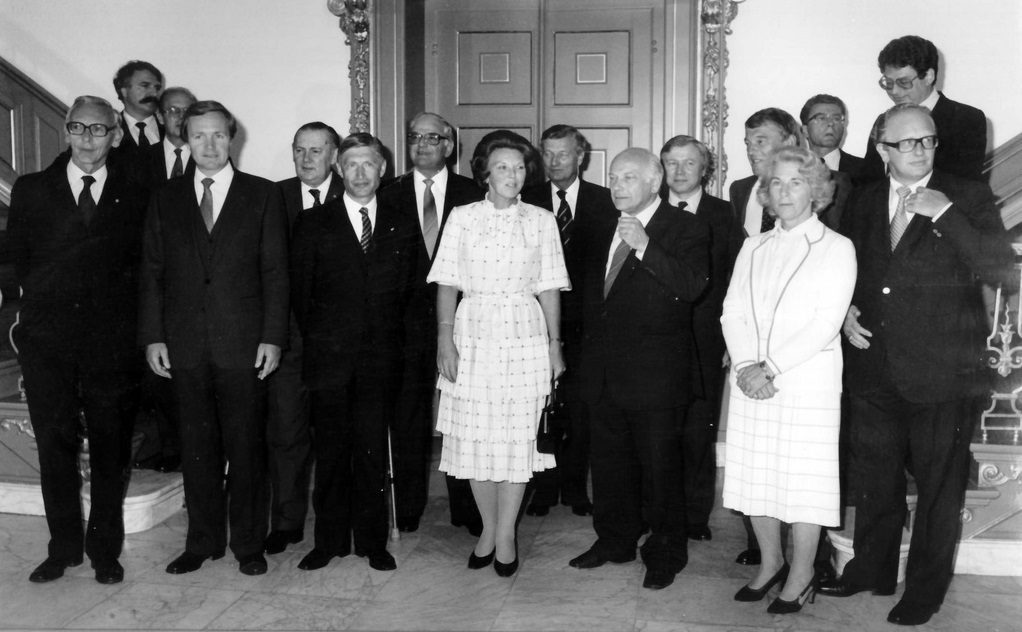
The bordes scene of the second Van Agt cabinet and Queen Beatrix at Paleis Huis ten Bosch, shortly after the queen sworn in the cabinet.

A cabinet formation took place in Netherlands following the general election of 26 May 1981. The formation led to the inauguration of the second Van Agt cabinet on 11 September, composed of the Christian Democratic Appeal (CDA), the Labour Party (PvdA), and Democrats 66 (D'66). The cabinet fell shortly before the government statement, but was patched up within three weeks.

== Background ==
=== Van Agt I Cabinet ===
The elections followed at the end of the term of the first Van Agt cabinet, a coalition of the Christian Democratic Appeal (CDA) and the People's Party for Freedom and Democracy (VVD). The cabinet was formed in 1977 after a record-long coalition formation process. During that formation, attempts were initially made for a coalition with the largest party, the Labour Party, the CDA, and Democrats 66 (D'66). When this failed in the final stages, a coalition of CDA and VVD was quickly formed. The collaboration divided the CDA, where some MPs, known as the CDA loyalists, merely provided supply and confidence the cabinet. Despite the narrow majority and the loyalists, the cabinet managed to finish its term.

The relations between CDA Prime Minister Dries van Agt and VVD Deputy Prime Minister Hans Wiegel, who were both party leaders again, were good. However, the relations between Van Agt and PvdA leader Joop den Uyl had been strained for a long time. This was already the case when Van Agt was a minister in the Den Uyl cabinet (1973–1977), but deteriorated further during the 1977 formation and Den Uyl's opposition to the cabinet. Their characters played a significant role in this animosity. The Catholic Van Agt took a relativistic approach to politics, which was not appreciated by Den Uyl, who came from a Calvinist background.

=== Election campaign ===
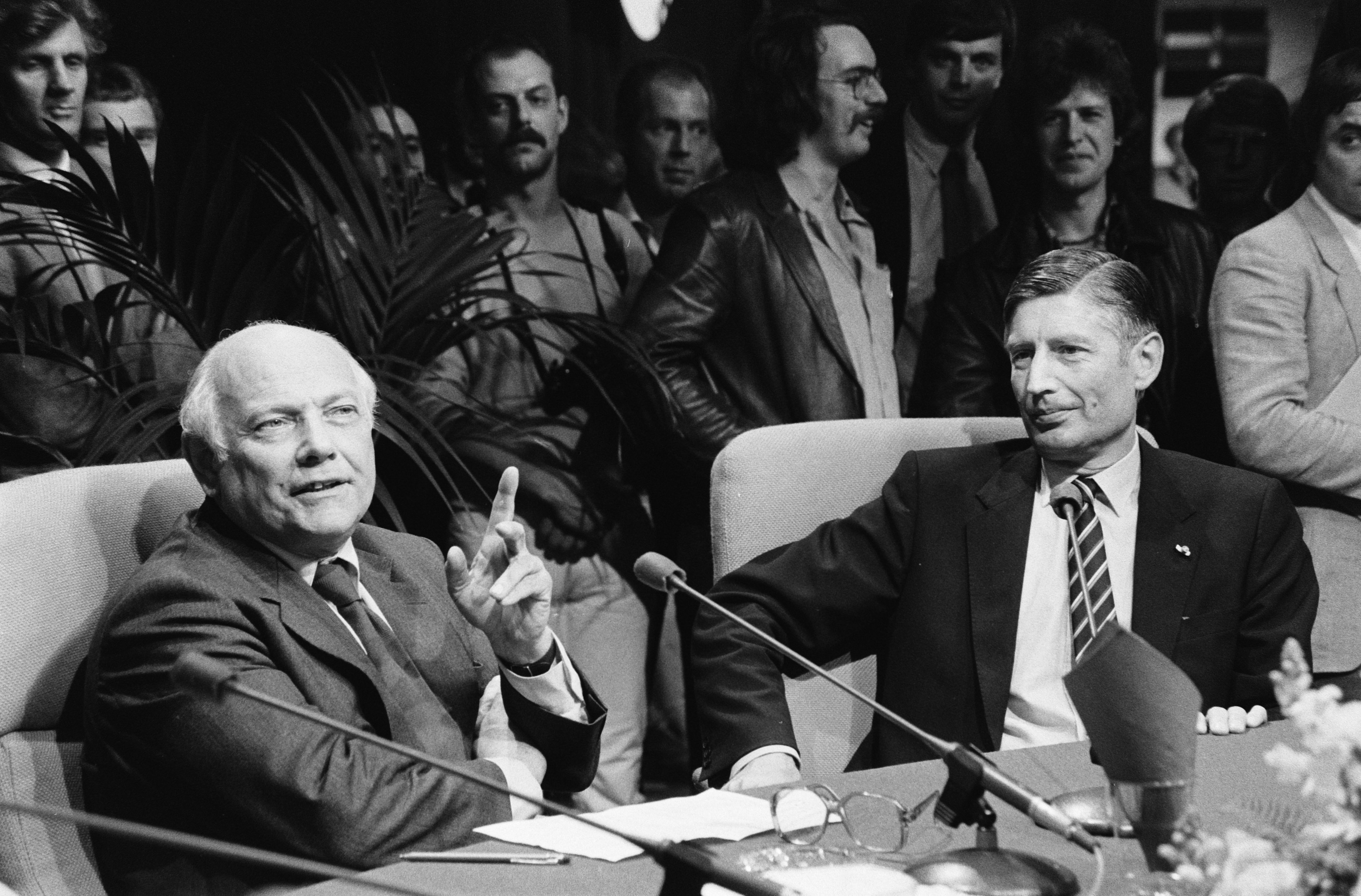
Den Uyl and Van Agt in debate during the election campaign.

The campaign was rather tepid. Financial and socio-economic problems following the 1979 oil crisis caused a certain apathy. Van Agt sought support for continuation of policies and preferred a coalition of CDA, VVD, and D'66. However, D'66's leader Jan Terlouw ruled out this combination. Van Agt was potentially willing to govern with the PvdA, even under Den Uyl's leadership. Similarly, the PvdA declared the same. The party feared a repeat of 1977 and moderated its polarization strategy. Hopes for a left-wing majority government vanished when D'66 excluded cooperation with the Communist Party of the Netherlands (CPN). On the other hand, the "Staphorst variant" was mentioned, where CDA and VVD would seek support from small right-wing Christian parties, although Van Agt remarked that "we cannot govern the country that way".

=== Election results ===
Seat distribution of the newly elected Second Chamber during the cabinet formation. CPN (3) PvdA (44) PSP (3) PPR (3) D'66 (17) VVD (26) CDA (48) GPV (1) RPF (1) SGP (3)

The big winner of these elections was D'66, which increased its seats from eight to seventeen. The 'big three' parties CDA, PvdA, and VVD all lost seats. CDA went from 49 to 48 seats, PvdA from 53 to 44, and VVD from 28 to 26. As a result of the losses by CDA and VVD, the coalition government lost its majority. Other winners included the RPF (new with two seats), the PSP (gained two), and the CPN (gained one). The Farmer's Party (participating as Right-wing People's Party in 1981) and DS'70 disappeared from the House.

== Informateurs Lubbers and De Koning ==
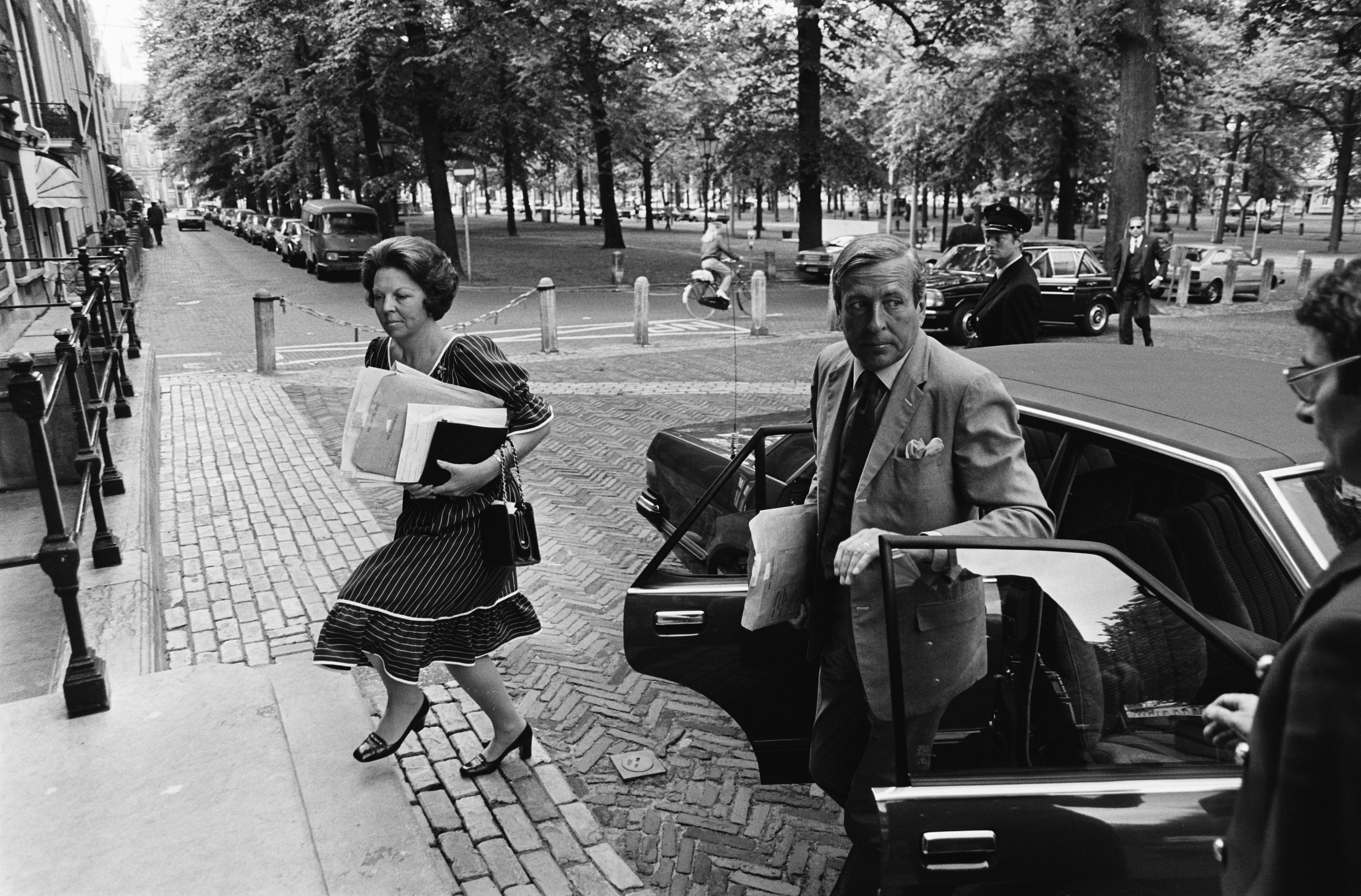
Queen Beatrix arrives at Lange Voorhout Palace on 1 June 1981 for the formation process.

Queen Beatrix sought advice in the days following the elections from her regular advisors and the parliamentary leaders. Van Agt proposed appointing two CDA informateurs due to the political complexity and urgency. He considered appointing Senate member Piet Steenkamp along with parliamentary leader Ruud Lubbers or Minister for Development Cooperation Jan de Koning. Den Uyl, Terlouw, and Wiegel believed one CDA informateur was sufficient.

Beatrix, who ascended to the throne in 1980, also sought advice from her Ministers of State, a practice usually reserved for impasses later in the formation process. Jaap Burger (PvdA), Marga Klompé (CDA), and Marinus Ruppert (ARP) advocated for a coalition of PvdA, CDA, and D'66. Willem Drees (former PvdA), whom Beatrix visited, advised that CDA member Jelle Zijlstra should again become prime minister. On 30 May, Beatrix appointed Lubbers and De Koning as informateurs. According to a parliamentary group staffer, their selection resulted from lobbying by Lubbers with other party leaders and Ministers of State.

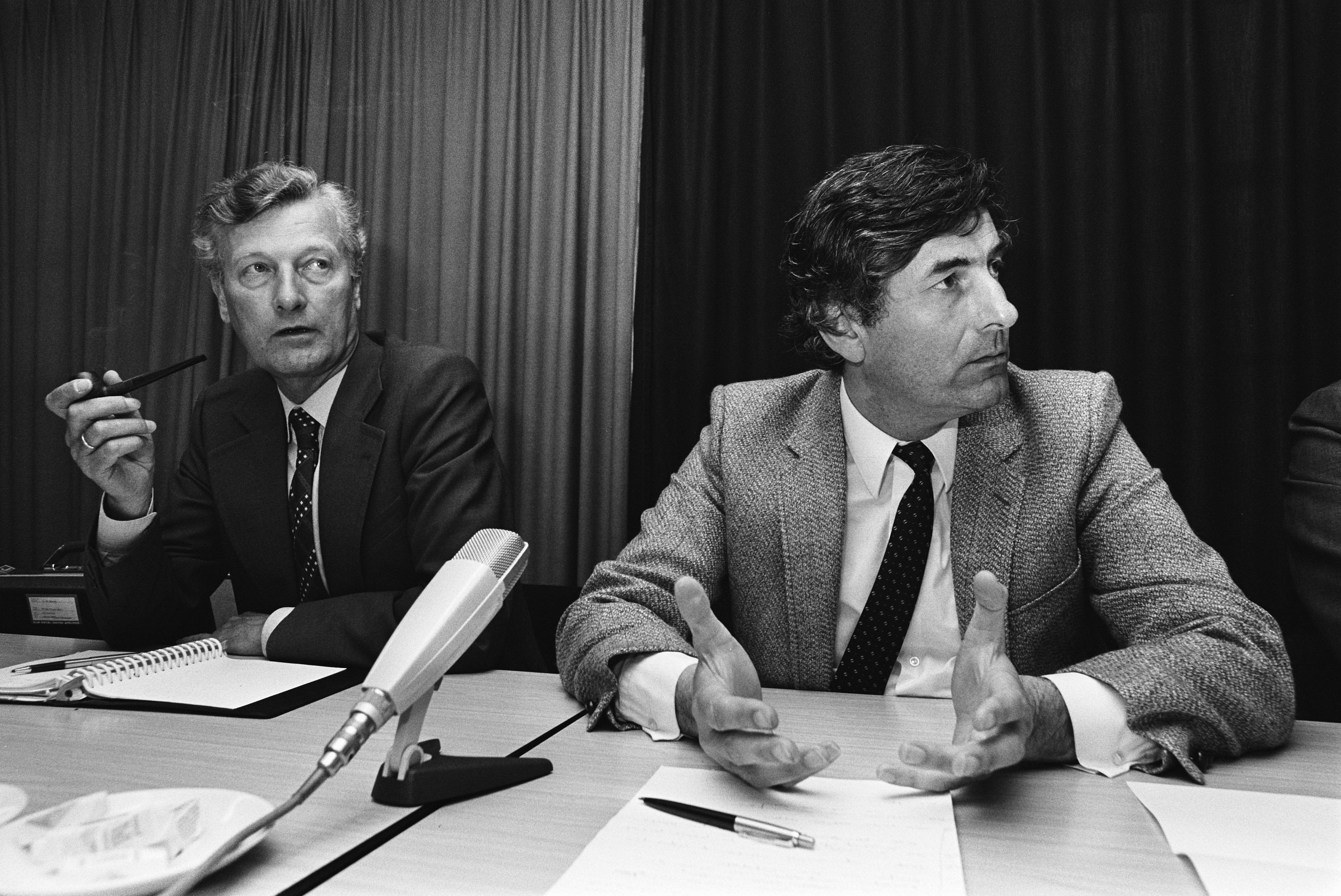
Informateurs Lubbers and De Koning at a press conference.

The informateurs were tasked with exploring which cabinet could "rely on the broadest possible support in the legislature." They quickly realized that the only possibility for this was a coalition of CDA, PvdA, and D'66. They began substantive negotiations to draft a governing program. Despite differences, the first draft coalition agreement was presented on 25 June. It proposed redirecting 4 billion guilders by 1985. The cabinet would temporarily refrain from deploying cruise missiles and await the outcome of negotiations between the United States and the Soviet Union. Van Agt described the agreement as "the same policy as the previous cabinet, with a touch of PvdA added." This drew criticism from D'66 and his own party.

=== Selecting a Prime Minister ===
The informateurs simultaneously asked the parties who should become prime minister. Naturally, CDA proposed Van Agt for the position. There were voices within the party suggesting replacing Van Agt, for instance with Lubbers, to salvage relations with PvdA if Den Uyl resigned. For PvdA, Van Agt was unacceptable, although they aimed to prevent another failure like in 1977 due to Van Agt's position. D'66 also opposed Van Agt, hoping to propose Terlouw as a 'bridge' between CDA and PvdA. However, the CDA party council confirmed on 20 June its commitment to Van Agt's candidacy. The informateurs thus continually postponed the Prime Minister question.

Meanwhile, the informateurs proposed a distribution of portfolios. Both CDA and PvdA would receive six ministerial positions, while D'66 would receive three. In addition to the Prime Ministership, CDA would hold Education, Justice, Development Cooperation, Finance, and Agriculture and Fisheries. PvdA would get Interior Affairs (combined with the Deputy Prime Ministership), CRM, Foreign Affairs, Social Affairs, Housing and Spatial Planning. As a sixth option, they could choose between Transport and Water Management or Public Health and Environmental Hygiene, with the other going to D'66. D'66 was displeased, as was PvdA. The combination of Interior Affairs with the Deputy Prime Ministership seemed to leave no room for Den Uyl, who had never shown interest in Interior Affairs. Terlouw was particularly dismayed about Defense and preferred Foreign Affairs for Laurens Jan Brinkhorst.

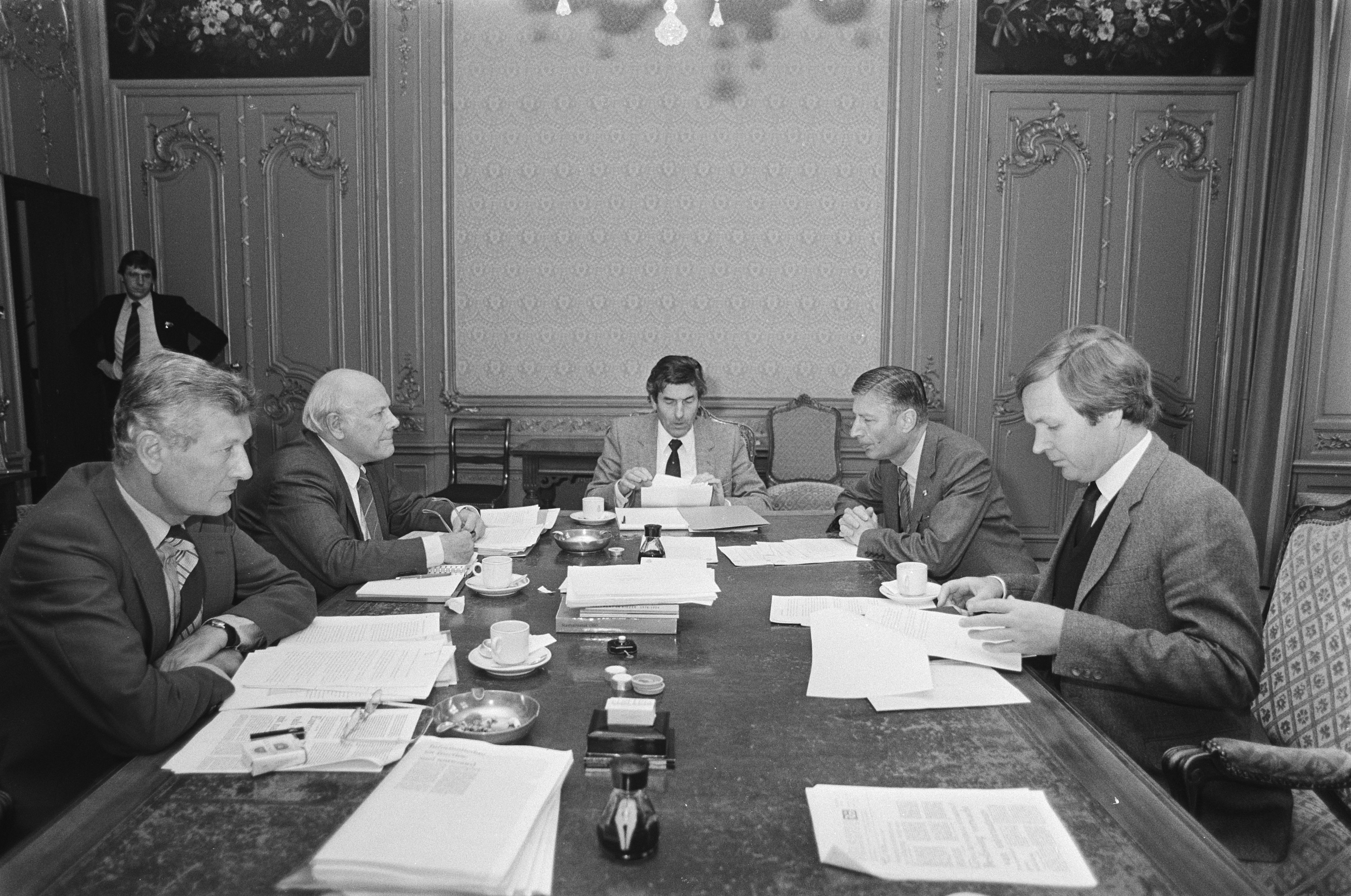
From left to right: informateur De Koning, Den Uyl, informateur Lubbers, Van Agt and Terlouw.

After the release of the agreement, Van Agt proposed on 1 July what he termed "the big leap forward". The agreement would be accepted without changes if the parties agreed to him as prime minister. This proposal was rejected by Terlouw and Den Uyl. On 3 July, Van Agt and CDA chairman Piet Bukman attempted a breakthrough by persuading Zijlstra to accept the premiership. However, Zijlstra declined for personal reasons and due to substantive objections to the agreement. Not even Klompé and Beatrix could persuade him. Subsequently, CDA informed Den Uyl and Terlouw of the attempt.

On 6 July, D'66 reluctantly agreed to Van Agt as prime minister, a move viewed by PvdA as betrayal. Faced with this decision, the PvdA parliamentary group ultimately agreed to Van Agt as prime minister, although eleven members voted against. PvdA then needed to secure more gains in the coalition agreement, obtain better portfolios, and include Ed van Thijn – who had opposed accepting Van Agt – as an informateur. Initially, Van Agt refused this last point, but eventually agreed under pressure.

== Informateurs Lubbers, De Koning, and Van Thijn ==
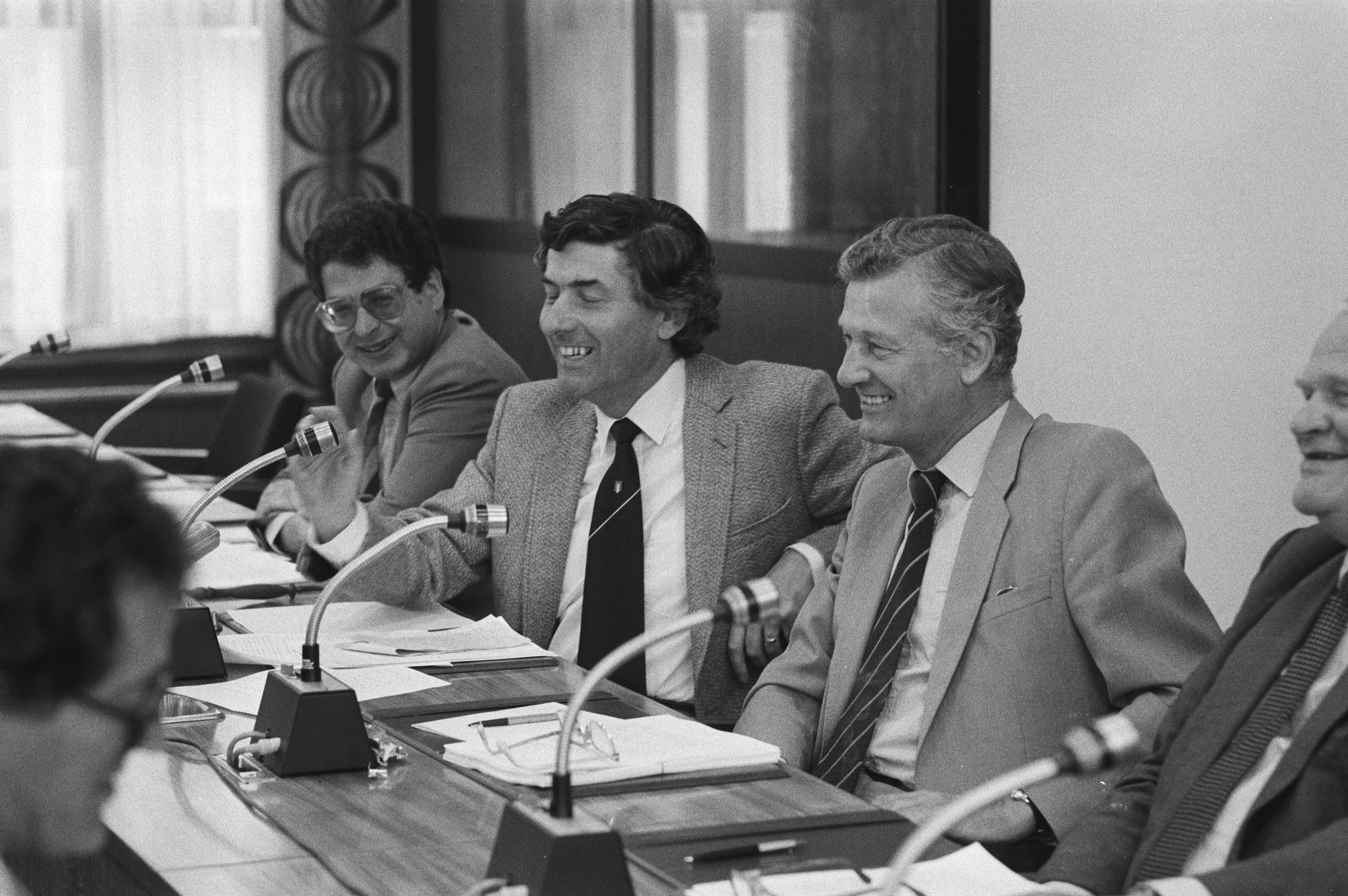
Press conference with informateurs Van Thijn, Lubbers, and De Koning (from left to right).

On 10 July, Van Thijn was appointed as informateur. After a two-day interlude, negotiations resumed. Several points of contention still needed to be worked out, such as nuclear energy, nuclear weapons, minimum income, and housing. Education, in particular, proved problematic. CDA and PvdA had agreed on the PvdA-desired middle school, but both claimed the department. Den Uyl also claimed Finance, and Terlouw desired Foreign Affairs.

On 20 July, negotiators and informateurs convened for a decisive session. As a solution proposed by Van Thijn, Den Uyl was appointed Minister of Social Affairs and Employment, project minister for employment, integrative minister for the socio-economic sector, and additionally responsible for Antillean Affairs. His role was termed a 'super minister' in the Haagsche Courant. This led to consternation within the CDA, perceiving it as a defeat for Van Agt. D'66 was furious as well, as the position allocated to Terlouw in Economic Affairs was reduced. As a compromise for Education, a PvdA minister was proposed. Two CDA state secretaries were added as 'watchdogs,' which Den Uyl found unacceptable and postponed.

=== Parliamentary group caucus ===
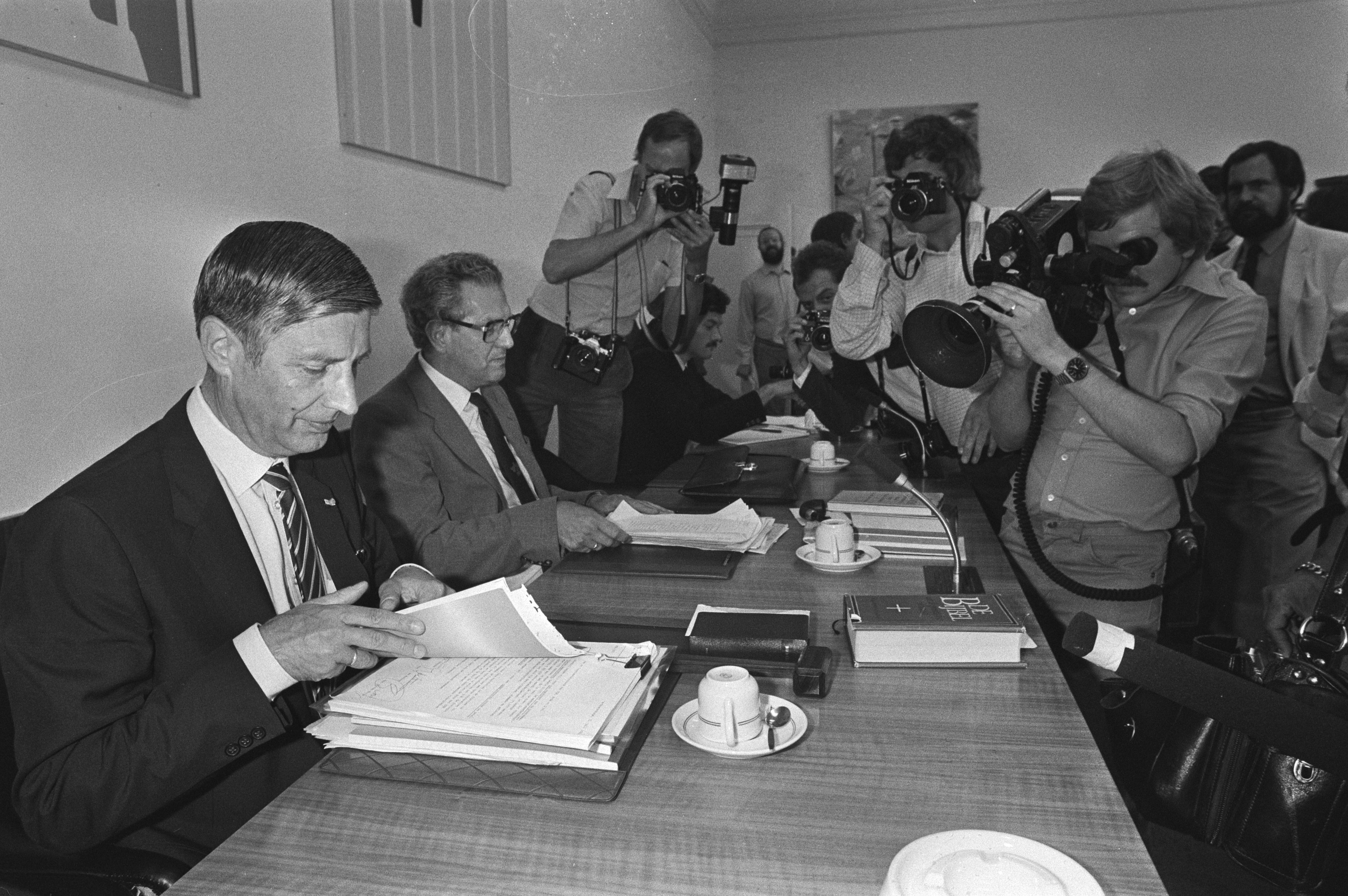
Van Agt at the parliamentary group meeting on 28 July.

The following day, the parliamentary groups of D'66 and PvdA agreed to the negotiation results. The CDA parliamentary group found the agreement unacceptable, feeling too many crucial positions were conceded. Van Agt barely defended the outcome. Subsequently, the parliamentary group proposed amendments. However, on 27 July, the informateurs refused to reopen the agreement, insisting that CDA must decide. A majority was willing to accept the agreement and resolve any remaining disputes under the guidance of a formateur.

Twelve members, including loyalists, publicly expressed unwillingness to follow Van Agt. Only on 30 July did the parliamentary group agree to a letter stating their readiness to form a government, provided the defense section was removed from the agreement. Regarding the socio-economic section, they believed advice should be sought during the formation phase from the president of the De Nederlandsche Bank Jelle Zijlstra, chairman of the Social and Economic Council Jan de Pous, and the director of the Bureau for Economic Policy Analysis Cees van den Beld, all prominent CDA members. Den Uyl again found this unacceptable.

Despite the CDA's letter, the informateurs drafted their final report and presented it as a definitive agreement. Van Agt strongly objected, but the parliamentary group still wished to proceed. However, on the same day, the D'66 parliamentary group also distanced themselves from the agreement, disagreeing with the informateurs' assertion that the remaining issues had been resolved.

== Formateurs Kremers and Van Thijn ==
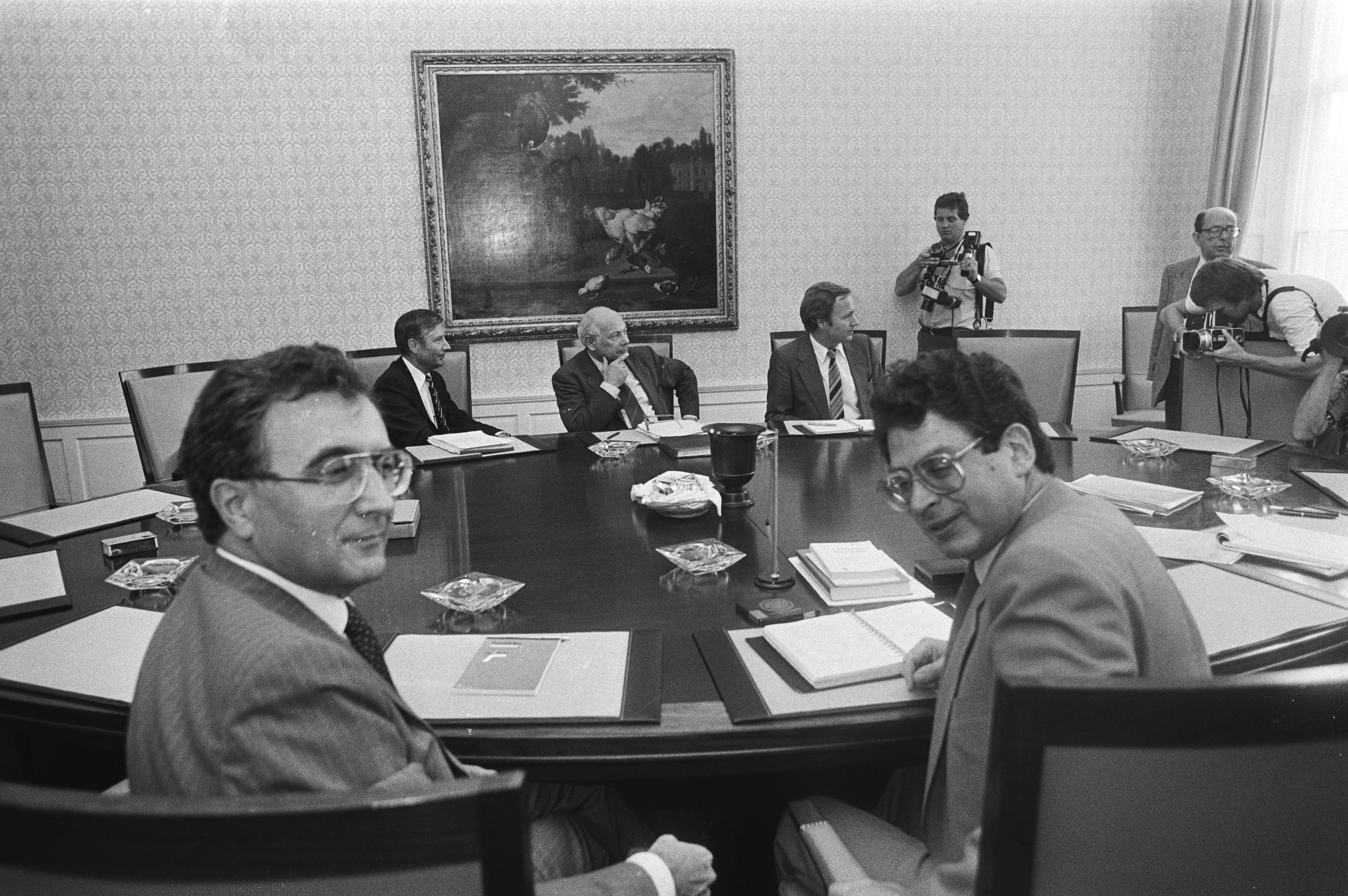
Formateurs Kremers (front left) and Van Thijn (front right) receive Van Agt, Den Uyl, Terlouw (rear left to right).

Despite D'66 objections, Beatrix aimed to appoint formateurs. On 4 August, she appointed Van Thijn and Limburg Commissioner of the King Sjeng Kremers (CDA) for this role. They were tasked with forming a cabinet based on the informateurs' final report, practically excluding new negotiations. They began working on ministerial appointments and made a proposal on 11 August.

On 12 August, Van Agt demanded an additional budget cut of 4.5 billion guilders for 1982, resulting from policies of the outgoing cabinet. Den Uyl and Terlouw were again furious, as the implementation of cuts was left to the cabinet. Subsequent discussions deteriorated, and according to several present, it nearly resulted in physical altercation.

On 17 August, the formateurs sought to present the conclusions to the parliamentary groups. Den Uyl and Terlouw indicated their support. Van Agt refused, stating he would resign if a significant portion of his parliamentary group voted in favor. The parliamentary group board asked Van Agt to moderate his stance. Former Minister Wilhelm Friedrich de Gaay Fortman, advocating for cooperation with PvdA, openly criticized Van Agt's behavior and the parliamentary group. On 19 August, the CDA parliamentary group voted. Twelve out of 47 members voted for the agreement, even without Van Agt. Sixteen members, including Lubbers, voted against only to prevent Van Agt from resigning. This revealed a majority did indeed support forming a government with PvdA and D'66. Consequently, the formateurs felt compelled to relinquish their mandate.

== Informateur De Gaay Fortman ==
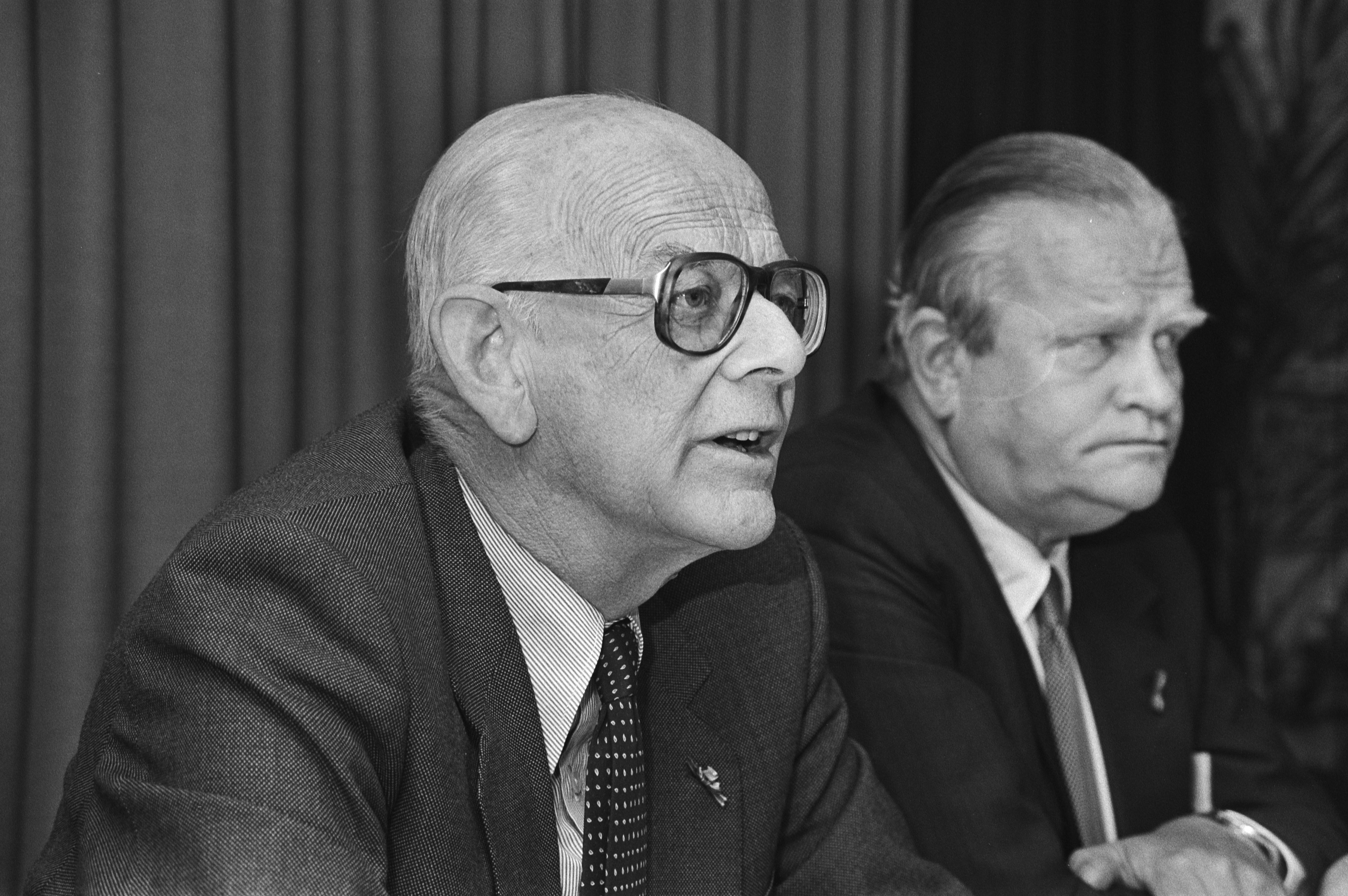
Informateur De Gaay Fortman giving a press conference.

On 20 August, Beatrix consulted again with her regular advisers and parliamentary leaders. Van Agt recommended appointing 'an authoritative member of the C.D.A.', adding that they should not have expressed a preference for a coalition yet. He mentioned Steenkamp and Willem Scholten as suitable for the profile. Terlouw also supported a CDA informateur and mentioned De Gaay Fortman. Minister of State Ruppert had also mentioned his name. When the queen suggested De Gaay Fortman, Van Agt, after a moment's thought, said he would not oppose it. Den Uyl preferred a PvdA member alongside a CDA informateur, while Van Wiegel believed the sitting cabinet's resignation should be rejected as long as D'66 blocked cooperation with CDA and VVD. That same evening, Beatrix appointed De Gaay Fortman as informateur.

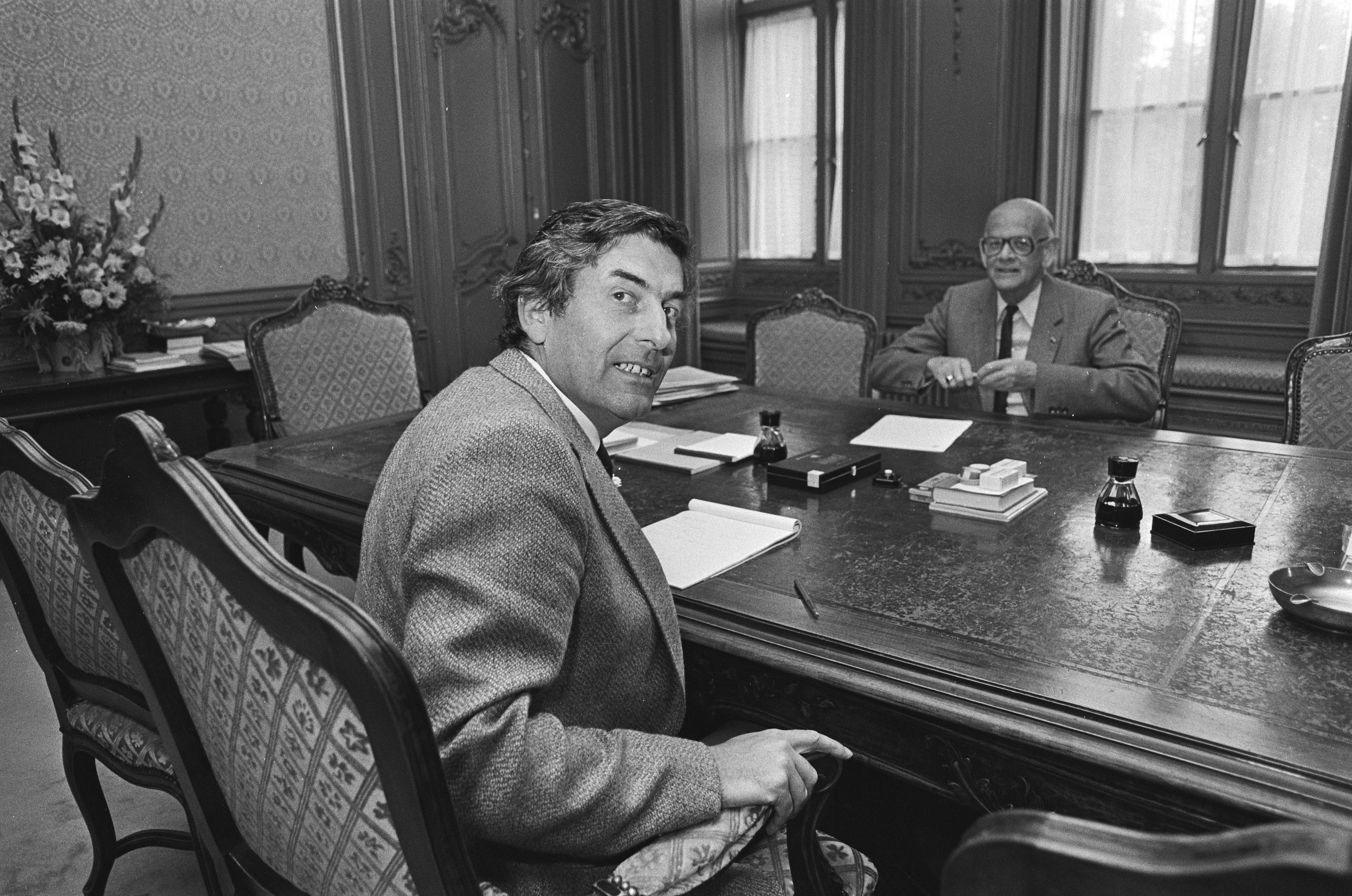
Lubbers as negotiator opposite informateur De Gaay Fortman.

Upon hearing this, Van Agt called in sick and informed Bukman that he would step down as parliamentary leader and negotiator. He found his position as negotiator untenable due to the parliamentary group's stance and also criticized the queen's approach for choosing a CDA member clearly favoring a coalition with the PvdA. Lubbers was subsequently appointed parliamentary leader, although Van Agt had recommended De Koning. The parliamentary group board stated in a press release that Van Agt should still become prime minister. Behind the scenes, Van Agt, along with Steenkamp and Finance Minister Fons van der Stee, drafted a socio-economic program for Lubbers to negotiate.

Relations improved between De Gaay Fortman and Van Agt when De Gaay Fortman personally visited him at home. They made progress on remaining points of contention. Lubbers was willing to abandon the specific budget cut of 4.5 billion guilders, suggesting the cabinet later determine the amount based on 'qualitative factors'. On the other hand, Den Uyl had to accept that a funding plan was required for his employment plans. Lubbers managed to persuade Van Agt, along with Van der Stee, to agree to the accord, although both were not enthusiastic. De Gaay Fortman subsequently drafted a final report recommending Van Agt be appointed as formateur.

== Formateur Van Agt ==
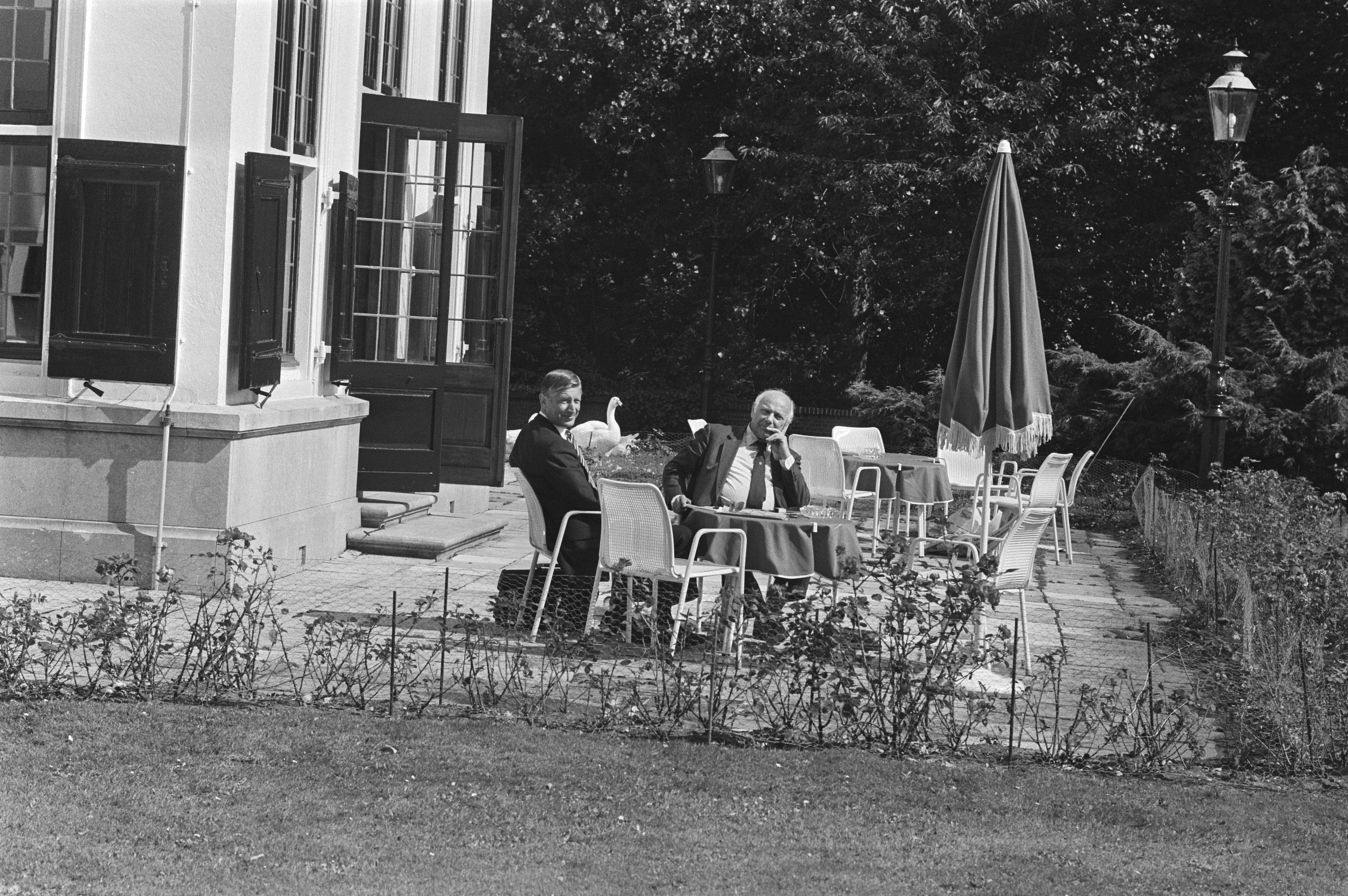
Formateur Van Agt in discussion with Den Uyl on the steps of Catshuis on 3 September 1981.

Van Agt was appointed as formateur on 2 September and had to proceed "based on the conclusions of informateur De Gaay Fortman". This meant no renegotiation of the program. He conducted his work from Catshuis to keep journalists at bay. Assembling the ministerial team proceeded smoothly, comprising political 'heavyweights'.

On 8 September, the "pre-constitutive deliberation" took place, which could not be called a constitutive deliberation as the PvdA congress still had to approve the participation of PvdA ministers. During the consultation, Van Agt wanted PvdA ministers to state they could not block a positive decision on deploying cruise missiles, which the PvdA refused to discuss again. Despite many 'points of contention' from the left wing of the PvdA not being achieved, an overwhelming majority of the party congress voted in favor of participating in the cabinet. The congress decided, however, that PvdA ministers should resign if the cabinet proceeded with the deployment of cruise missiles.

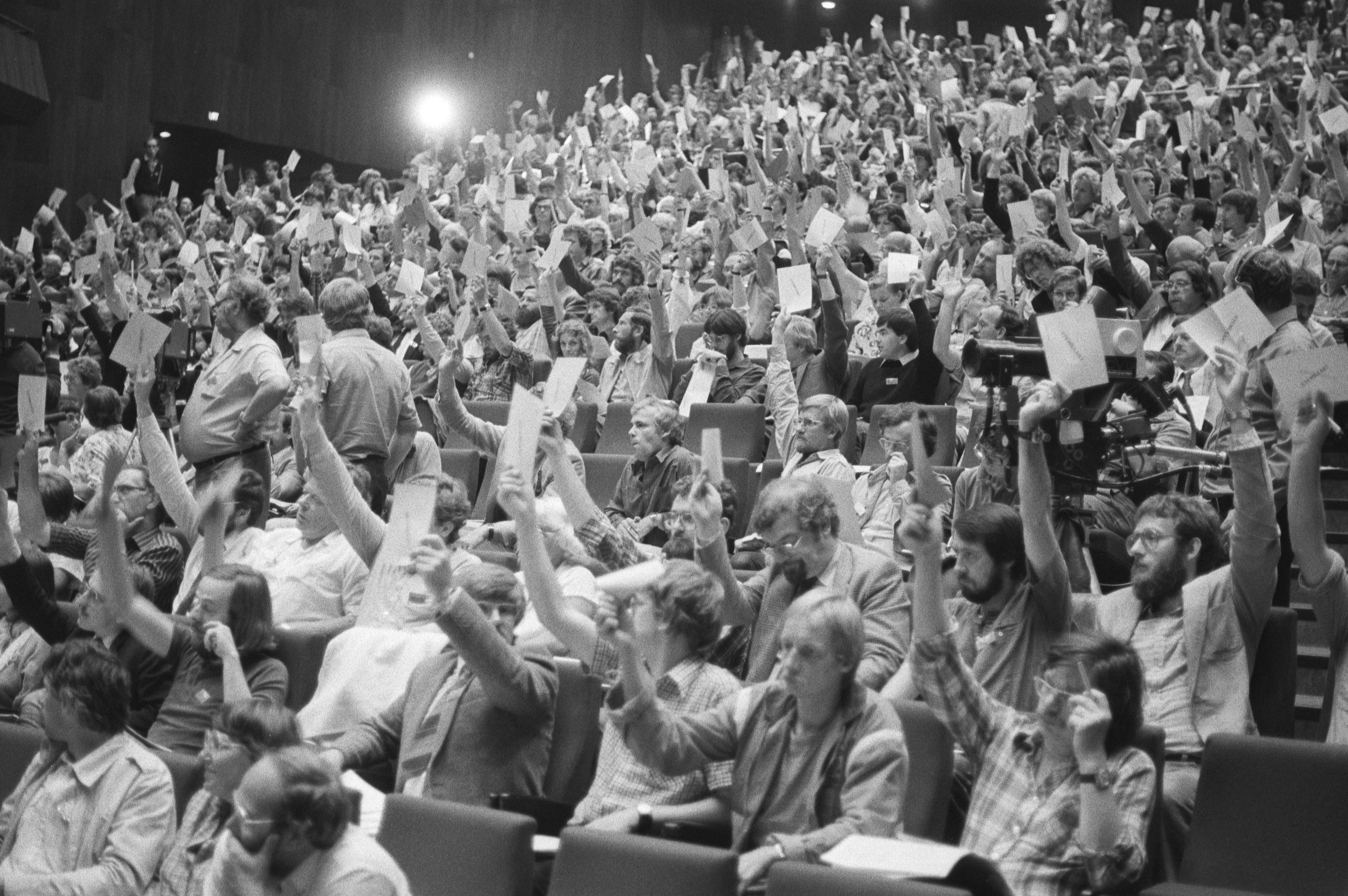
The PvdA congress during the votes on the coalition agreement.

On 10 September, the actual constitutive consultation took place. There, the PvdA ministers confirmed in a letter written by Van Thijn during his formation attempt that they would cooperate with the deployment of cruise missiles but subsequently resign. On 11 September, the cabinet was sworn in. Due to rain, the bordes scene could not take place on the steps of Paleis Huis ten Bosch and had to be moved indoors.

== Cabinet crisis ==
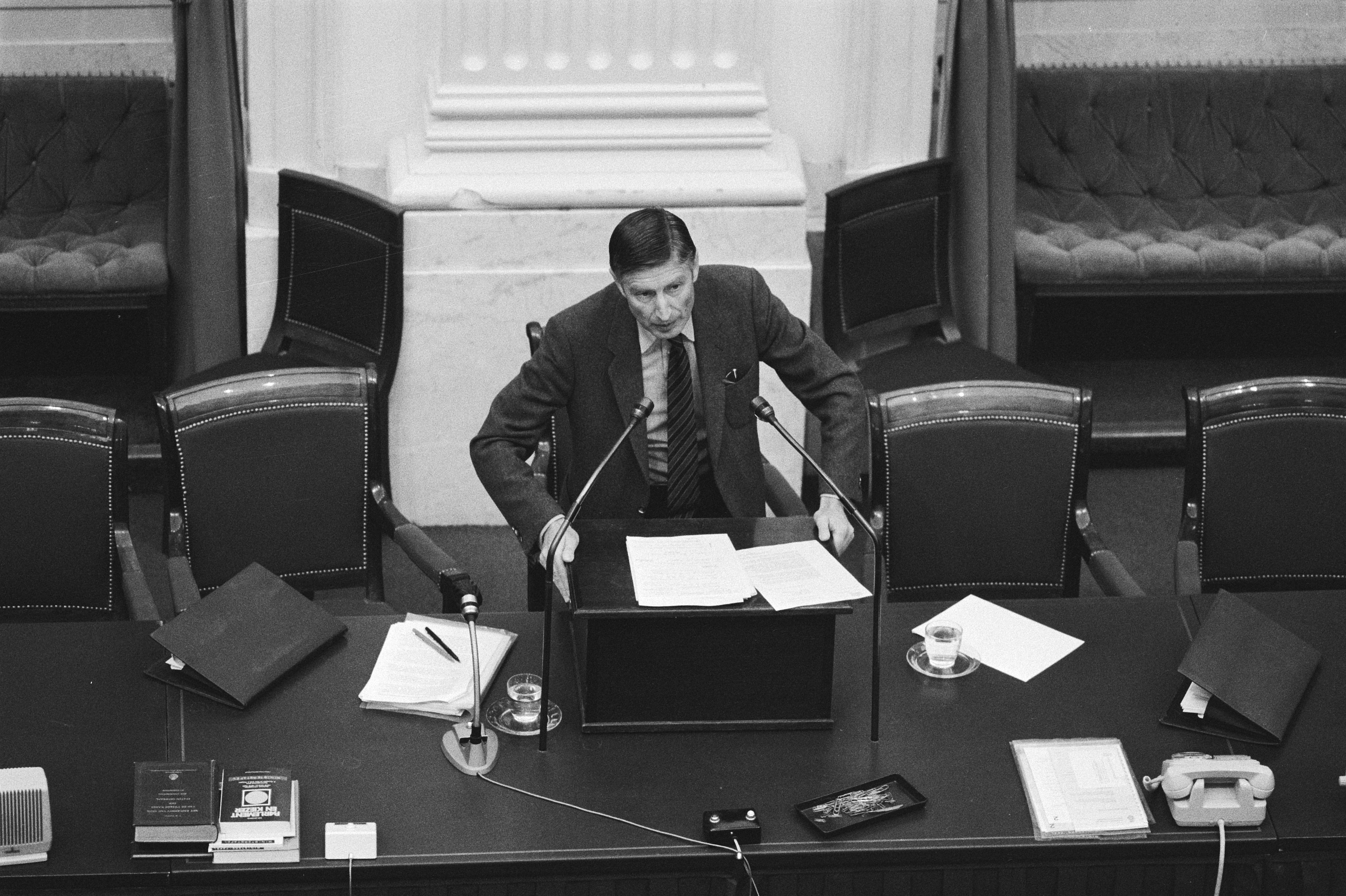
Van Agt during the debate on the cabinet crisis on 19 October.

The government statement was scheduled for 17 October. Den Uyl immediately began with his employment plans, quickly clashing with other ministers from both CDA and D'66. According to them, his plans did not conform to the coalition agreement and threatened others' budgets. What followed were proposals on 8 October for an additional five billion in spending, while 4.25 billion needed to be cut. Den Uyl's proposal to let the budget deficit increase was rejected by Finance Minister Van der Stee and Economic Affairs Minister Terlouw. Due to disagreement, the government statement was postponed by a week. Efforts were made to find a compromise, but in the night from 15 to 16 October, the PvdA ministers voted against Van Agt's final offer. On 16 October, the ministers offered their resignations to the queen.

== Informateurs De Galan and Halberstadt ==
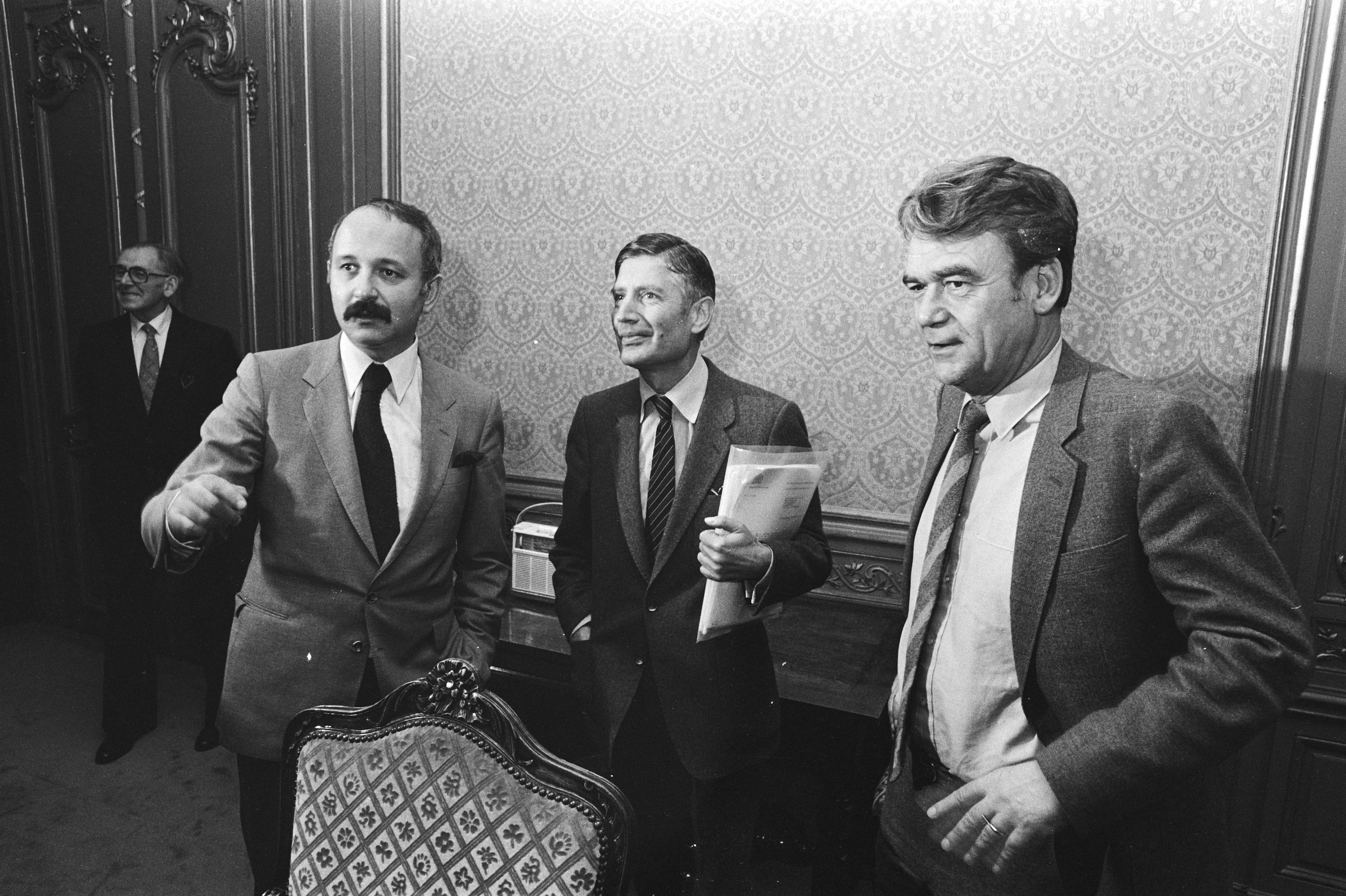
Van Agt (center) with informateurs Halberstadt (left) and De Galan (right).

Immediately after the rupture, the ministers expressed a desire to mend the rift. Lubbers wanted to take on the task of formation himself, but the CDA wanted to avoid giving the impression that, after their significant role in the formation, they were determined to revive the cabinet at all costs. Furthermore, they believed that the PvdA had caused the break and thus should provide an informateur. Therefore, the three parties advised in that direction. Therefore, on 17 October, PvdA economists Cees de Galan and Victor Halberstadt were appointed as informateurs. Director of De Nederlandsche Bank (DNB) Wim Duisenberg was also approached but declined for fear of binding DNB to the coalition agreement.

The three parties approached the mending process optimistically. The blame game was kept internal, and little was disclosed about the discussions. The financially prudent informateurs presented a proposal in early November to finance the employment plan with one billion through a temporary solidarity levy. This idea stemmed from FNV chairman Wim Kok. After adjustments, the proposal was accepted by D'66 ministers, but CDA ministers remained opposed. The CDA would only agree if the labor movement did not make wage demands that would nullify the employment policy's tax increase, which was unacceptable to the PvdA. In the evening of 4 November, the ministers reached a compromise, agreeing to review the labor movement's response in a year, with a wage measure not ruled out. The informateurs then submitted their final report, and on behalf of the cabinet, Van Agt requested permission from the queen to resume office.

== Aftermath ==
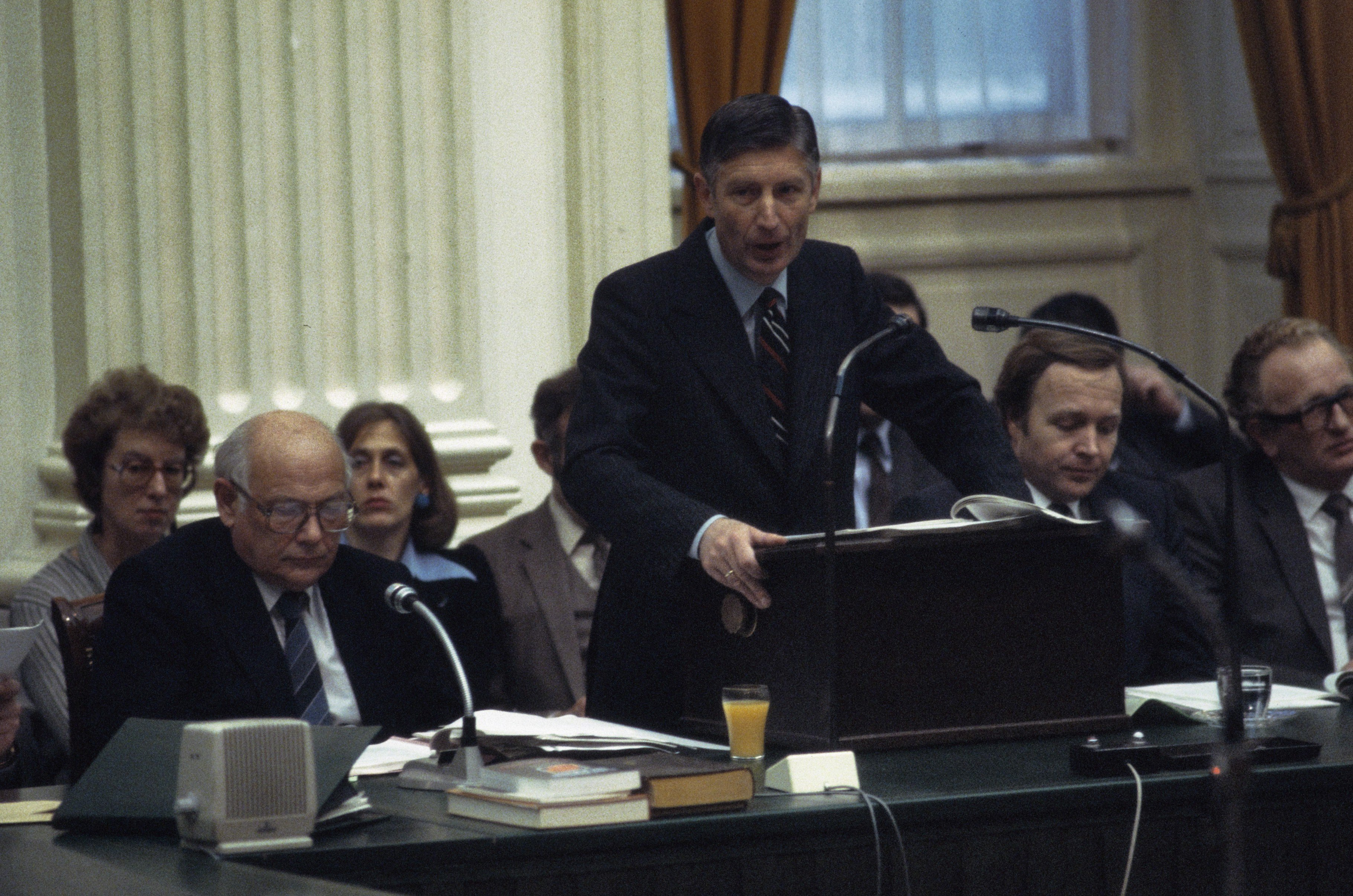
Van Agt reads the government statement on 16 November 1981.

Even thereafter, the new cabinet faced challenges. It fell on 29 May 1982, barely six months into its term.
