= May–June 1982 Dutch cabinet formation =

Formation of the third Van Agt cabinet

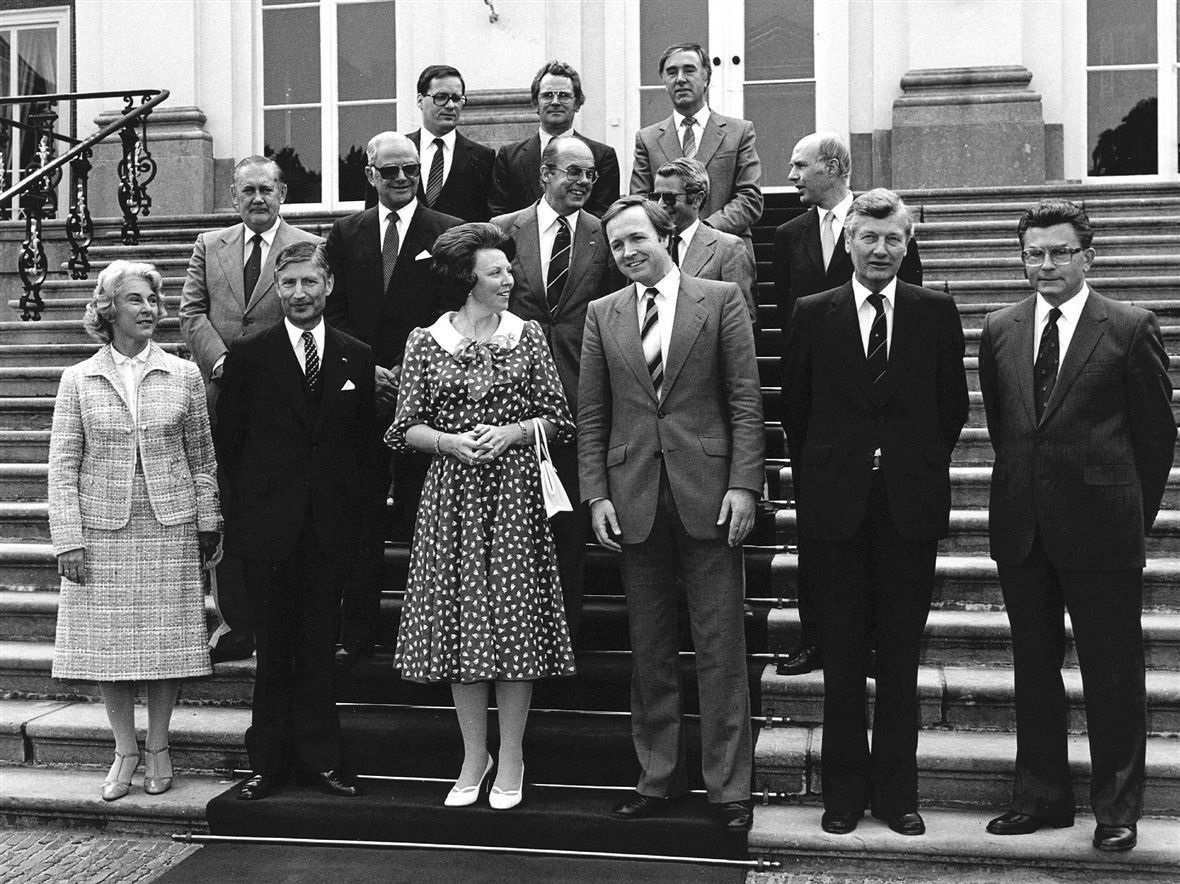
The bordes scene of the third Van Agt cabinet with in the middle queen Beatrix.

After the Dutch second Van Agt cabinet fell on 12 May 1982, the rump cabinet Van Agt III was formed. On 29 May, this minority cabinet of Christian Democratic Appeal (CDA) and Democrats 66 (D'66) took office. It was a continuation of Van Agt II, but without the Labour Party (PvdA).

After the fall of the cabinet, informateur Piet Steenkamp was appointed. In twelve days he concluded that the restoration of the old cabinet was not possible. He recommended an interim cabinet of CDA and D'66. Within five days, formateur Dries van Agt formed this cabinet with new ministers. To avoid a motion of censure at the start of the cabinet, he did concessions to the People's Party for Freedom and Democracy (VVD) to get their support.

== Background ==
The distribution of seats in the House of Representatives during the cabinet formation. CPN (3) PvdA (44) PSP (3) PPR (3) D'66 (17) VVD (26) CDA (48) GPV (1) RPF (2) SGP (3)

The previous second Van Agt cabinet fell due to economic differences and poor personal relationships. It was a 'fighting cabinet', in which the relationship between CDA Prime Minister Dries van Agt and PvdA Deputy Prime Minister Joop den Uyl was particularly difficult, ever since the Den Uyl cabinet (1973–1977). In response to the economic crisis in the Netherlands, CDA and D'66 wanted austerity, while PvdA wanted to create jobs with additional government expenditure. When no agreement was reached on the spring budget update, Van Agt presented a proposal in the Council of Ministers on 11 May. The six CDA ministers and three D'66 ministers voted in favor, the six PvdA ministers against.

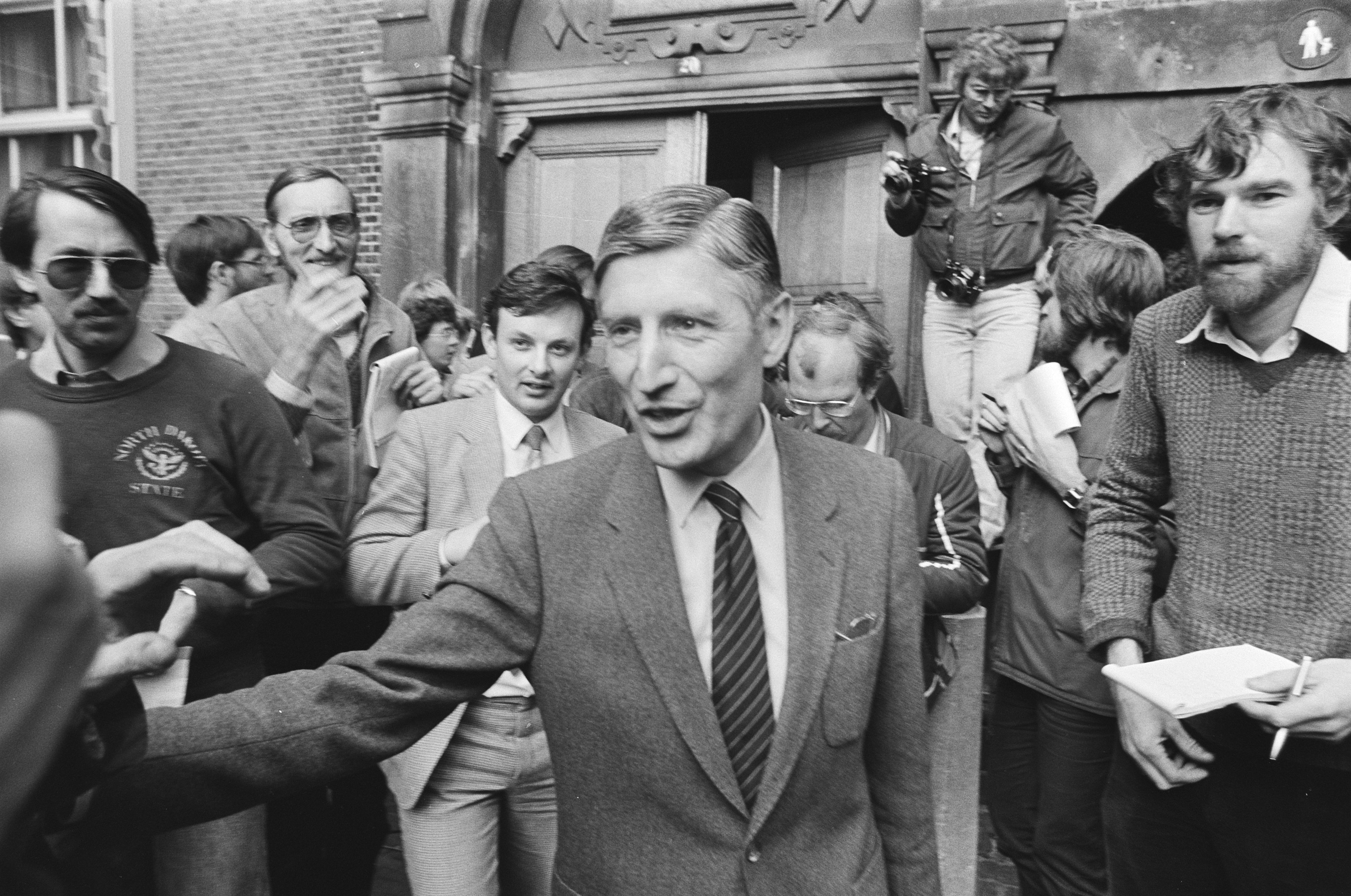
Van Agt leaves a meeting on 11 May about the cabinet crisis.

A day later, the parliamentary leaders tried in vain to defuse the cabinet crisis. During a cabinet meeting, Van Agt indicated that the PvdA ministers should first offer their resignation, after which the CDA ministers would decide on their own position. However, D'66 indicated that it would also make their portfolios available immediately. After the meeting, Van Agt reported this to the queen. Only just before midnight did Van Agt report that the CDA ministers also made their portfolio available. This gave the impression that they had wanted to stay on, but was probably mainly a stab at the PvdA. The parliamentary debate of 13 May focused on the late resignation of the CDA ministers.

== Informateur Steenkamp ==
On the day of the debate, queen Beatrix started a series of conversations with her regular advisors and with the parliamentary group leaders of the four largest parties. CDA parliamentary group leader Ruud Lubbers argued for a minority cabinet of CDA and D'66 that would complete the Spring Memorandum and prepare the budget. Elections should then take place in the autumn and the People's Party for Freedom and Democracy (VVD) should provide confidence and supply for such a cabinet. However, VVD leader Ed Nijpels preferred to participate in a regular cabinet. PvdA parliamentary group leader Wim Meijer did not comment on the composition of a cabinet, but wanted such a cabinet to only prepare the elections. D'66 parliamentary group leader Laurens Jan Brinkhorst wanted a reunification with PvdA, to the dissatisfaction of his party leader and Deputy Prime Minister Jan Terlouw. Following the advice of CDA, PvdA, and VVD that recommended a CDA member, Beatrix appointed Senator Piet Steenkamp as informateur.

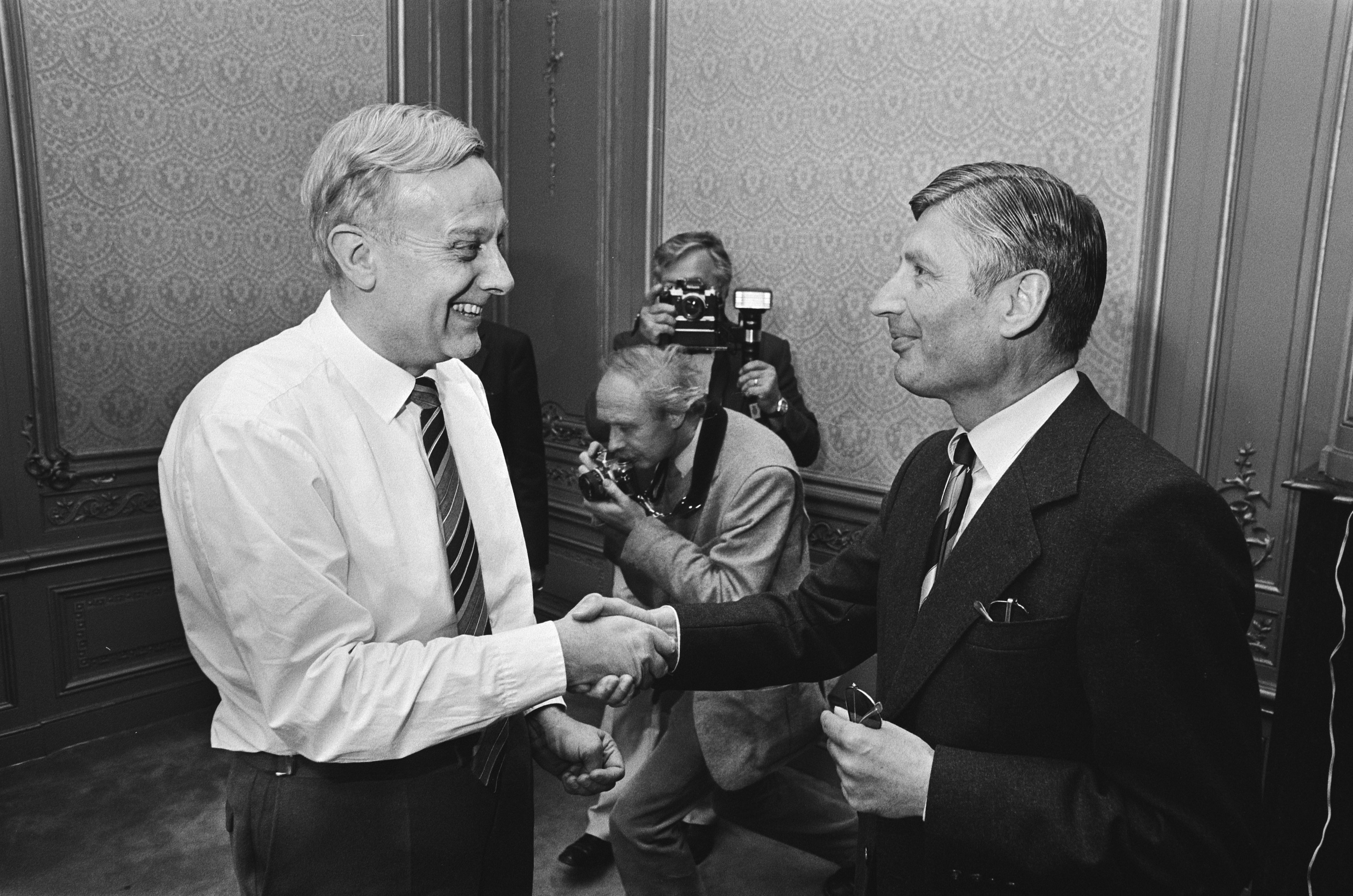
Steenkamp (l) receives Van Agt for a meeting on 18 May.

Steenkamp's meeting with the four major parties did not lead to new insights. Nijpels was no longer demanding full coalition participation, but did demand that the VVD be involved in policy, including the budget. Brinkhorst and Lubbers rejected this. A reunification of the old coalition was not desirable for PvdA, VVD and CDA and D'66 and CDA saw no point in a demissionary cabinet. On 19 May, Steenkamp informed Beatrix that he would focus on an interim cabinet of CDA and D'66. The same day, the D'66 parliamentary group agreed to a minority cabinet with CDA after two days of meetings. Four of the seventeen party members voted against. D'66-Minister Hans van Mierlo indicated that he was considering leaving his position because of his objections to this decision.

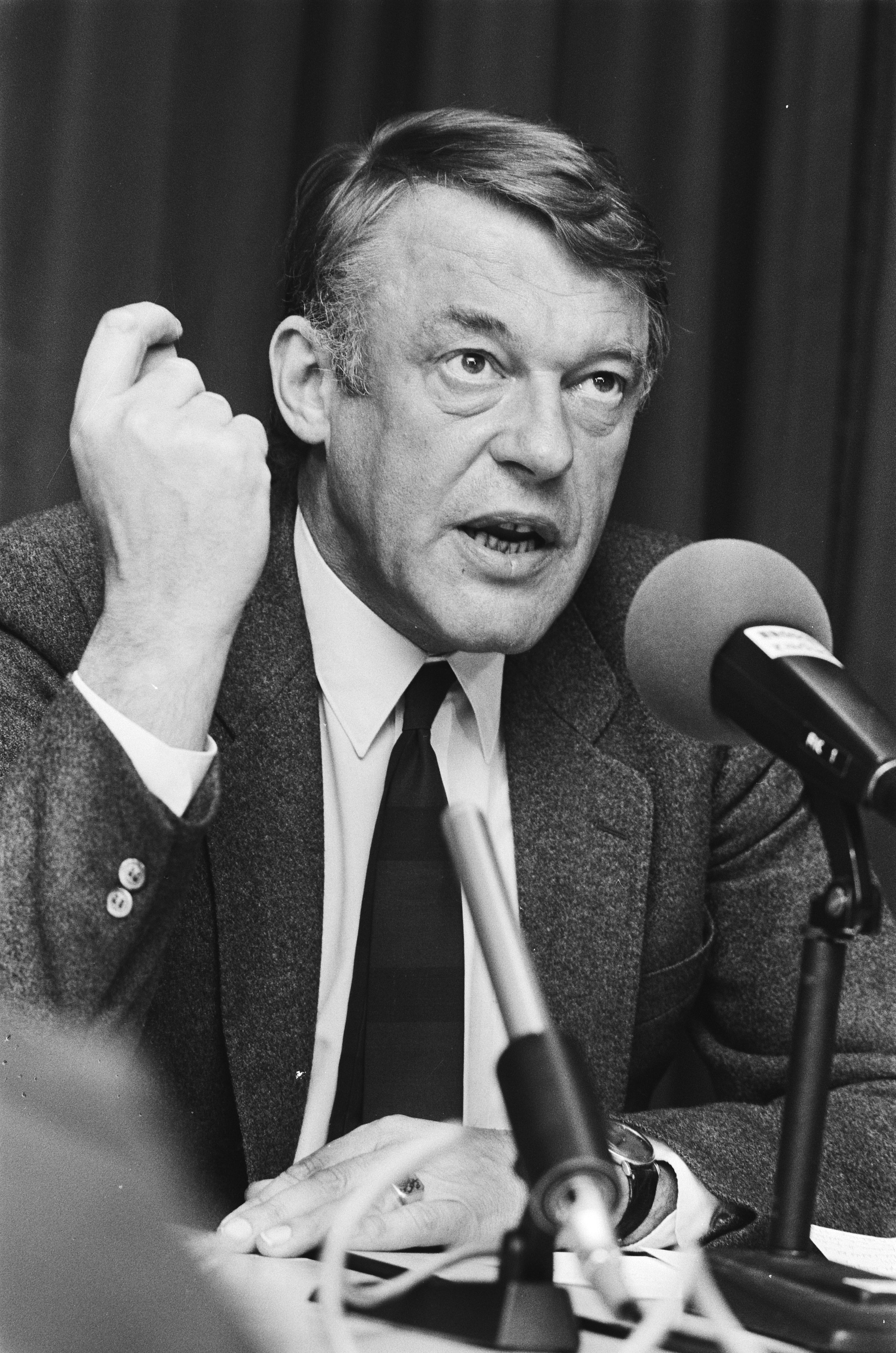
Van Mierlo announces during a press conference on 24 May that he will remain as Minister in the new cabinet.

Lubbers and Brinkhorst drew up a mini coalition agreement. The priority was the spring budget update. The 'employment plan' remained on the agenda and they maintained the link between minimum wage and minimum benefits. Four of the vacant ministerial posts went to CDA and two to D66, giving them a total of ten and five posts respectively. D'66 also wanted the cabinet to resign after the submission of the budget, which CDA ultimately agreed to. The elections should therefore take place as soon as possible after Prinsjesdag. The D'66 advisory council supported the parliamentary group decision and Van Mierlo also decided to remain in the interim cabinet. Steenkamp asked PvdA and VVD whether they were prepared not to reject the cabinet in advance. PvdA was not prepared to do this, but VVD would be if they were involved in talks. Steenkamp then submitted his final report in which he indicated that there was no obstacle to an interim cabinet of CDA and D'66. He advised to appoint Van Agt as formateur.

== Formateur Van Agt ==
On 26 May, Van Agt started as formateur, with confidence and supply from VVD requiring the most attention. VVD wanted policy commitments, and also that no state secretaries would be appointed and that the elections would take place on 8 September, before Prinsjesdag. For the latter there was a narrow majority of VVD, PvdA, PPR, CPN and PSP. Lubbers and Van Agt initially refused to accommodate the VVD. However, on 28 May they resigned themselves to the political situation. Except for Social Affairs, no state secretaries would be appointed and when it came to the election date, the cabinet would take the House majority into account. The cabinet would also make the control of collective expenditure and the fight against unemployment advocated by the VVD part of policy.

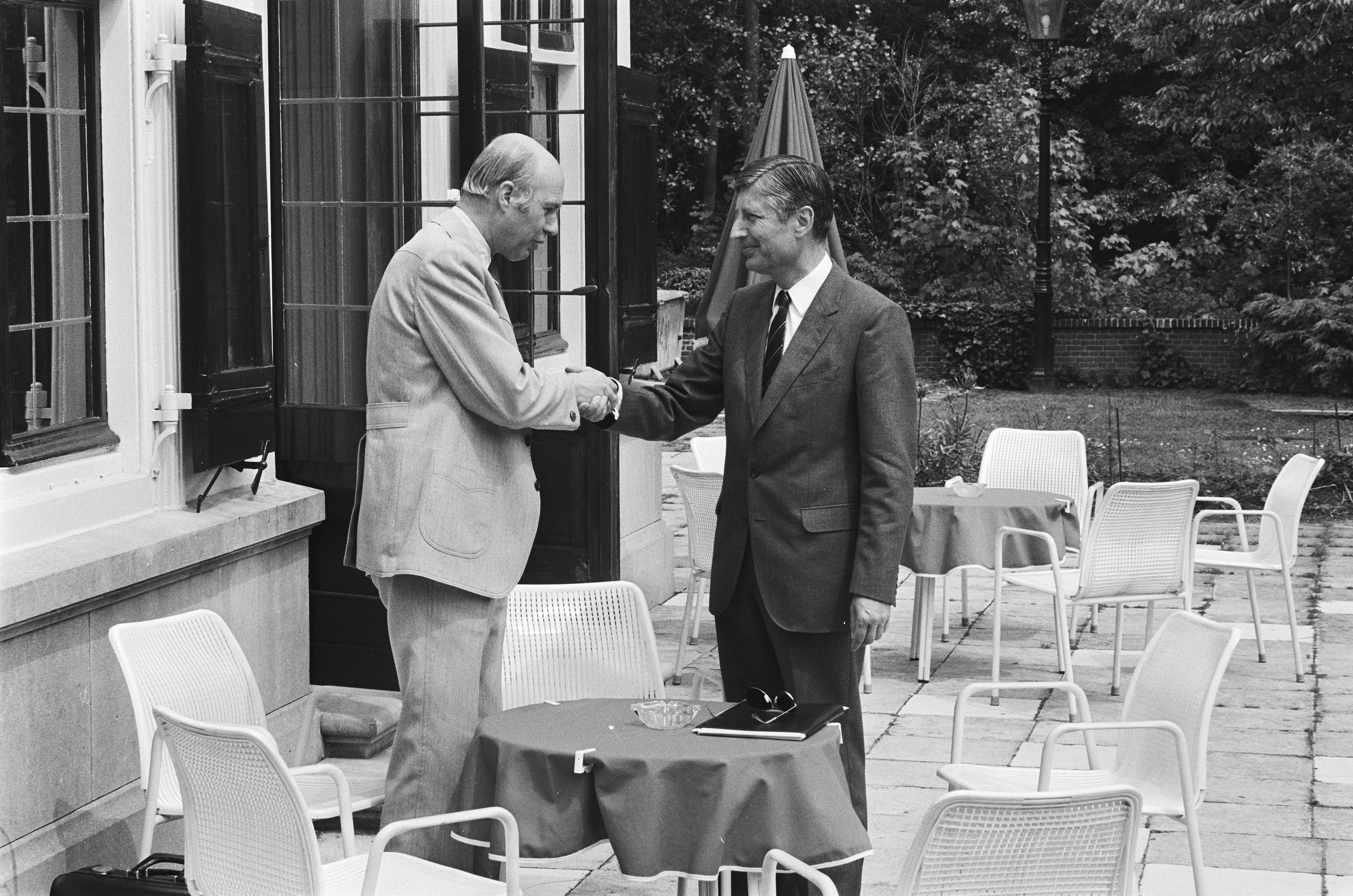
Formateur Van Agt meets with D66 MP and candidate Minister Erwin Nypels on 27 May.

At D'66, Max Rood and Erwin Nypels became ministers. At the CDA, party leader Lubbers announced on 27 May that he would become Minister of Social Affairs, while the number two from the parliamentary group – Louw de Graaf – would already become State Secretary in the same department. The majority of the parliamentary group therefore wanted him to remain parliamentary group leader. A day later - when it was also announced that the election date would be before Prinsjesdag - he announced that he would not join the cabinet. Instead of Lubbers, De Graaf became minister. Two other ministerial positions were taken by state secretaries Hans de Boer and Wim Deetman. Van Agt would combine the premiership with the Ministry of Foreign Affairs. This led to surprise, because State Secretary for Foreign Affairs Hans van den Broek could have been promoted and Van Agt would be busy as the intended party leader. Van Agt later stated that he had been asked by Beatrix to combine the posts.

During the constitutive deliberation on 29 May, Van Agt stated, at the request of Nypels, that no commitments had been made to the VVD. The same day, after the swearing in of the new ministers, the bordes scene took place.

== Aftermath ==
On 8 June Van Agt delivered the government statement and the debate about it followed. As expected, a majority in the House voted for elections on 8 September. A minority of the left-wing parties CPN, PSP, PPR and PvdA supported a motion of censure.

The Third Van Agt cabinet remained non-demissionary for another three months. Since they did not submit the 1983 budget due to the election date, it was little more than minding the shop. Because of its short duration, the cabinet was called the 'summer cabinet'. It raised the question of whether the seventeen-day formation was necessary for the little governing the cabinet did.
