= Bordes scene =

Photograph of a new Dutch cabinet

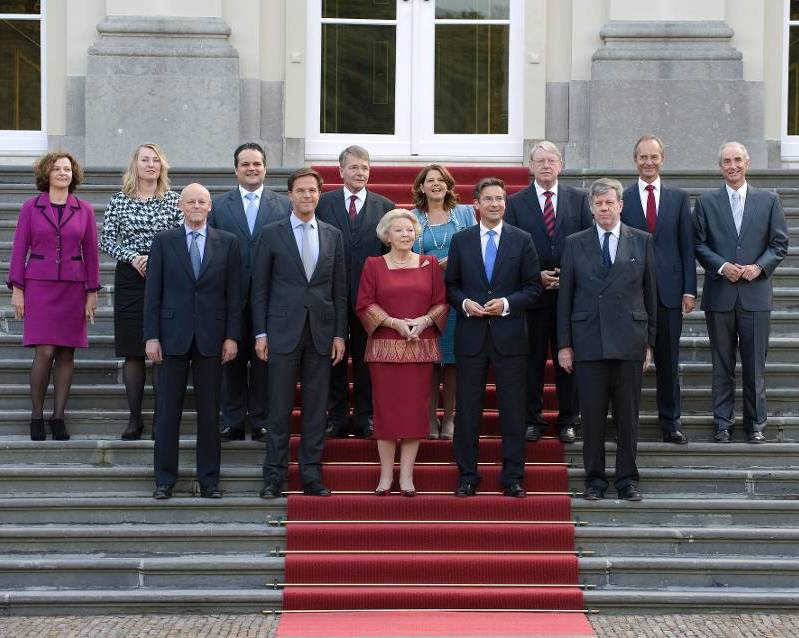
The bordes scene of the First Rutte cabinet in 2010

The bordes scene (Dutch: bordesscène) is a photo moment at the end of a Dutch cabinet formation, immediately after the swearing-in, where the new Dutch cabinet presents itself. The photo shows the king or queen and the ministers. Although the name refers to the bordes, the photo takes place in front of or on the stairs leading to the bordes.

== History ==
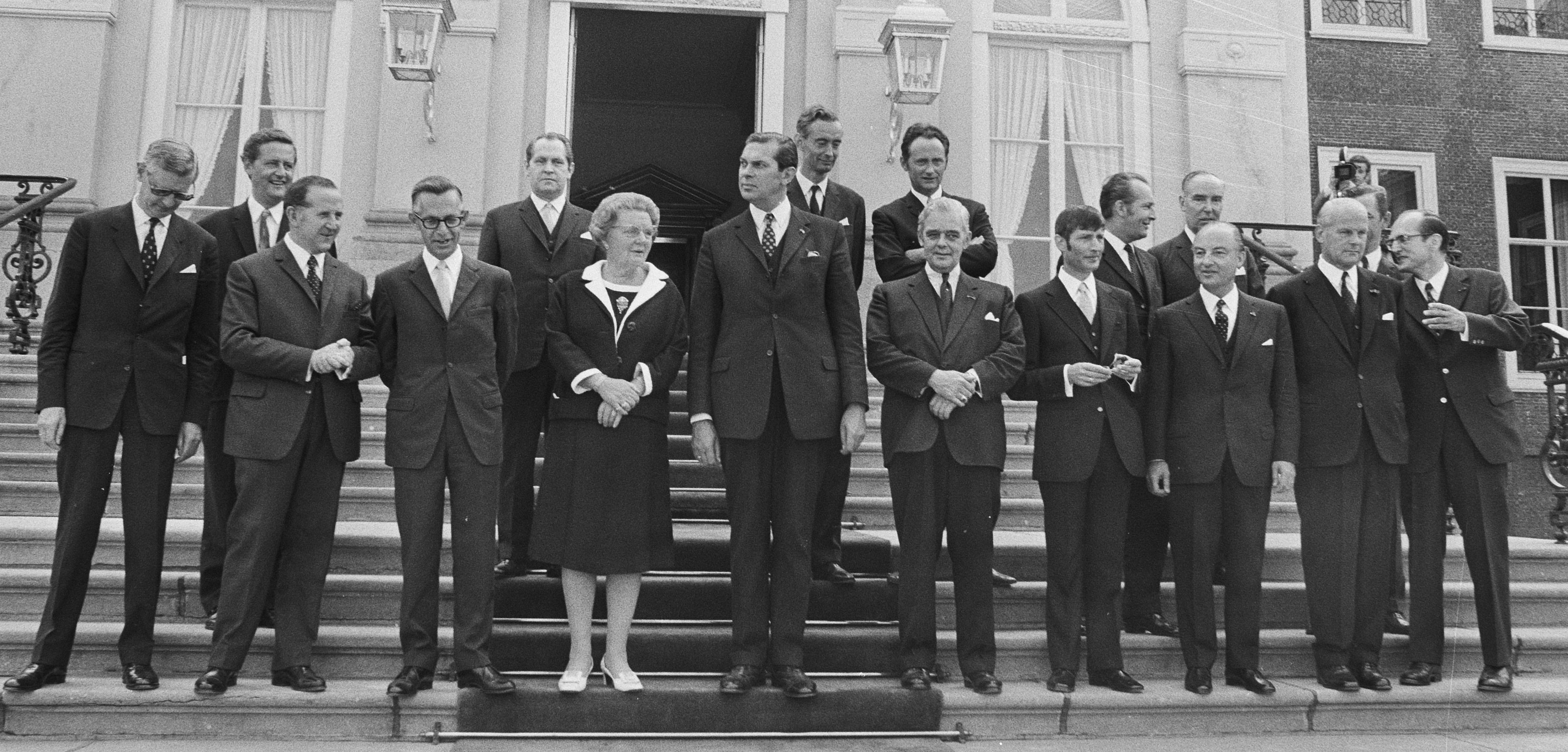
The first bordes scene in 1971 of the first Biesheuvel cabinet at palace Huis ten Bosch

The first bordes scene took place in 1971 when the First Biesheuvel cabinet took office. The government wanted to be more public with this official photo opportunity. Before that time, the photo moment was informal at the beginning of the first Council of Ministers and therefore without the queen.

== Line up ==
The king or queen is always in the center at the front. To its right is the Prime Minister and to its left the first Deputy Prime Minister. The other Deputy Prime Ministers may also stand alternately on the right and left. The other ministers are sorted by chapters of the dutch national budget, which is based on the seniority of the ministries. Ministers from new departments and ministers without portfolio are therefore at the back.

This has been deviated from on a few occasions when female ministers have been brought forward. In 1973, ministers of Democraten 66 (D66) and Political Party Radicals (PPR) were also brought forward to emphasize that they participated in the Den Uyl cabinet.

== Location ==
The bordes scene almost always takes place on the steps of Palace Huis ten Bosch. In 1977 the First Van Agt cabinet was photographed at the Soestdijk Palace. In 1981, the photo was taken in the hall of Huis ten Bosch due to bad weather. In 1998, 2017 and 2022 they moved to the Noordeinde Palace. In 2017 it was not possible at Huis ten Bosch due to renovations. In 2022, due to the corona crisis, people had to keep their distance on the landing scene, for which there was more space at Noordeinde.
