= List of members of the House of Representatives of the Netherlands, 2017–2021 =

House of Representatives, 2017–2021
←	2012–2017	2021–2023	→
- Composition of the House of Representatives at the start of the term.

Overview
- Legislative body: House of Representatives
- Meeting place: Binnenhof
- Term: 23 March 2017 – 30 March 2021
- Election: 2017
- Government: Third Rutte cabinet VVD: 33 D66: 19 CDA: 19 CU: 5
- Opposition: PVV: 20 SP: 14 GL: 14 PvdA: 9 PvdD: 5 50PLUS: 4 Denk: 3 SGP: 3 FvD: 2
- Members: 150
- Speaker of the House of Representatives: Khadija Arib

Between 23 March 2017 and 30 March 2021, 195 individuals served in the House of Representatives, the 150-seat lower house of the States-General of the Netherlands. 150 representatives were elected in the 15 March 2017 general election and installed at the start of the term; 44 representatives were appointed as replacements when elected representatives resigned or went on leave. Khadija Arib, who had been elected Speaker of the House in 2016, continued serving in that capacity for the duration of this period.

After the election, the third Rutte cabinet was formed from a coalition of the People's Party for Freedom and Democracy (VVD, 33 seats), Christian Democratic Appeal (CDA, 19 seats), Democrats 66 (D66, 19 seats) and Christian Union (CU, 5 seats). The opposition consisted of the Party for Freedom (PVV, 20 seats), GroenLinks (GL, 14 seats), Socialist Party (SP, 14 seats), Labour Party (PvdA, 9 seats), Party for the Animals (PvdD, 5 seats), 50PLUS (50+, 4 seats), Reformed Political Party (SGP, 3 seats), DENK (3 seats) and Forum for Democracy (FvD, 2 seats).

During the term, three members switched their parliamentary group affiliation, changing the party composition of the House of Representatives. (Note: Resignations generally do not affect the balance of power, as replacements are appointed from the party list) Wybren van Haga was removed from the VVD on 24 September 2019; he continued as an independent member and later joined FvD on 30 November 2020. Femke Merel van Kooten-Arissen left the PvdD on 16 July 2019 and continued as an independent. When Henk Krol left 50+ on 6 May 2020, he and Van Kooten-Arissen briefly formed a parliamentary group, but split on 8 August 2020.

== Members ==
All members are sworn in at the start of the term, even if they are not new. Assumed office in this list therefore refers to the swearing in during this term (or return date of members who left), while all members are automatically considered to have left office at the end of the term.

Members of the House of Representatives of the Netherlands, 2017–2021
Name	Parliamentary group	Assumed office	Left office	Ref.
Roy van Aalst	PVV	23 March 2017	30 March 2021	
Thierry Aartsen	VVD	13 September 2018	30 March 2021	
Fleur Agema	PVV	23 March 2017	30 March 2021	
Eva Akerboom	PvdD	16 October 2018	2 February 2019 (Note: Temporarily replaced Femke Merel van Kooten-Arissen)	
Mahir Alkaya	SP	18 January 2018	30 March 2021	
Mustafa Amhaouch	CDA	23 March 2017	30 March 2021	
Gerard van den Anker	CDA	12 January 2021	30 March 2021	
Khadija Arib	PvdA	23 March 2017	30 March 2021	
Tamara van Ark	VVD	23 March 2017	25 October 2017 (Note: Left to join the cabinet)	
Lodewijk Asscher	PvdA	23 March 2017	30 March 2021	
Farid Azarkan	DENK	23 March 2017	30 March 2021	
Malik Azmani	VVD	23 March 2017	9 June 2019 (Note: Elected to the European Parliament)	
Thierry Baudet	FvD	23 March 2017	30 March 2021	
Bente Becker	VVD	23 March 2017	22 June 2019 (Note: Went on parental leave)	
Bente Becker	VVD	13 October 2019	30 March 2021	
Sandra Beckerman	SP	23 March 2017	30 March 2021	
Harm Beertema	PVV	23 March 2017	30 March 2021	
Salima Belhaj	D66	23 March 2017	30 March 2021	
Joba van den Berg-Jansen	CDA	23 March 2017	30 March 2021	
Niels van den Berge	GL	5 June 2019	30 March 2021	
Vera Bergkamp	D66	23 March 2017	30 March 2021	
Marijke van Beukering-Huijbregts	D66	22 January 2020	12 May 2020 (Note: Temporarily replaced Rens Raemakers)	
Marijke van Beukering-Huijbregts	D66	20 May 2020	30 March 2021	
Roelof Bisschop	SGP	23 March 2017	30 March 2021	
Monica den Boer	D66	31 October 2017	18 May 2020 (Note: Left to become professor)	
Martijn Bolkestein	VVD	2 July 2020	30 March 2021	
Albert van den Bosch	VVD	23 March 2017	30 March 2021	
Martin Bosma	PVV	23 March 2017	30 March 2021	
André Bosman	VVD	23 March 2017	30 March 2021	
Achraf Bouali	D66	23 March 2017	30 March 2021	
Corrie van Brenk	50+	23 March 2017	30 March 2021	
Han ten Broeke	VVD	23 March 2017	4 September 2018 (Note: Left after allegations of sexual harassment)	
Laura Bromet	GL	7 June 2018	30 March 2021	
Hanke Bruins Slot	CDA	23 March 2017	3 June 2019 (Note: Left to become member of the provincial executive of Utrecht)	
Eppo Bruins	CU	23 March 2017	30 March 2021	
Kathalijne Buitenweg	GL	23 March 2017	30 March 2021	
Chris van Dam	CDA	23 March 2017	30 March 2021	
Sander Dekker	VVD	23 March 2017	25 October 2017	
Antje Diertens	D66	23 March 2017	30 March 2021	
Teun van Dijck	PVV	23 March 2017	30 March 2021	
Emiel van Dijk	PVV	3 April 2018	19 July 2018 (Note: Temporarily replaced Gabriëlle Popken)	
Emiel van Dijk	PVV	12 December 2018	30 March 2021	
Gijs van Dijk	PvdA	23 March 2017	30 March 2021	
Jasper van Dijk	SP	23 March 2017	30 March 2021	
Elbert Dijkgraaf	SGP	23 March 2017	10 April 2018 (Note: Left for personal reasons)	
Klaas Dijkhoff	VVD	23 March 2017	30 March 2021	
Sharon Dijksma	PvdA	23 March 2017	31 May 2018 (Note: Left to become alderman of Amsterdam)	
Pia Dijkstra	D66	23 March 2017	30 March 2021	
Remco Dijkstra	VVD	23 March 2017	30 March 2021	
Jeroen Dijsselbloem	PvdA	23 March 2017	23 October 2017 (Note: Left because he did not have enough energy)	
Carla Dik-Faber	CU	23 March 2017	30 March 2021	
Isabelle Diks	GL	23 March 2017	29 April 2020 (Note: Left to become alderman of Groningen)	
Nico Drost	CU	26 March 2019	14 July 2019 (Note: Temporarily replaced Stieneke van der Graaf)	
Pieter Duisenberg	VVD	23 March 2017	6 September 2017 (Note: Left to become chair of Vereniging van Universiteiten)	
Jessica van Eijs	D66	23 March 2017	30 March 2021	
Zohair El Yassini	VVD	23 March 2017	30 March 2021	
Corinne Ellemeet	GL	23 March 2017	30 March 2021	
Ingrid van Engelshoven	D66	23 March 2017	25 October 2017	
Eva van Esch	PvdD	9 October 2019	30 March 2021	
Sietse Fritsma	PVV	23 March 2017	30 October 2019 (Note: Left to start his own business)	
Sietse Fritsma	PVV	1 September 2020	30 March 2021	
Frank Futselaar	SP	23 March 2017	30 March 2021	
Simon Geleijnse	50+	7 November 2018	25 February 2019 (Note: Temporarily replaced Léonie Sazias)	
Simon Geleijnse	50+	12 March 2019	25 June 2019	
Lenny Geluk-Poortvliet	CDA	31 October 2017	30 March 2021	
Tobias van Gent	VVD	5 September 2018	30 March 2021	
Karen Gerbrands	PVV	23 March 2017	10 December 2018 (Note: Left after she felt she did not get enough support from colleagues after the suicide of Willie Dille)	
Henk van Gerven	SP	3 April 2018	30 March 2021	
Jaco Geurts	CDA	23 March 2017	30 March 2021	
Machiel de Graaf	PVV	23 March 2017	30 March 2021	
Stieneke van der Graaf	CU	31 October 2017	25 March 2019	
Stieneke van der Graaf	CU	15 July 2019	30 March 2021	
Rik Grashoff	GL	23 March 2017	6 June 2018 (Note: Left to become member of the provincial executive of North Brabant)	
Dion Graus	PVV	23 March 2017	30 March 2021	
Tjeerd de Groot	D66	23 March 2017	30 March 2021	
Maarten Groothuizen	D66	23 March 2017	30 March 2021	
Sybrand van Haersma Buma	CDA	23 March 2017	28 May 2019 (Note: Left to become mayor of Leeuwarden)	
Wybren van Haga	VVD (Note: Until 24 September 2019)	5 September 2018	30 March 2021	
Wybren van Haga	Van Haga (Note: Between 24 September 2019 and 30 November 2020)	5 September 2018	30 March 2021	
Wybren van Haga	FvD (Note: From 30 November 2020)	5 September 2018	30 March 2021	
Mark Harbers	VVD	23 March 2017	25 October 2017	
Mark Harbers	VVD	11 June 2019	30 March 2021	
Rudmer Heerema	VVD	31 October 2017	30 March 2021	
Pieter Heerma	CDA	23 March 2017	30 March 2021	
Lilian Helder	PVV	23 March 2017	30 March 2021	
Martijn van Helvert	CDA	23 March 2017	30 March 2021	
Jeanine Hennis-Plasschaert	VVD	23 March 2017	12 September 2018 (Note: Left to become Special Representative for Iraq and Head of the United Nations Assistance Mission for Iraq)	
Sophie Hermans	VVD	23 March 2017	30 March 2021	
Theo Hiddema	FvD	23 March 2017	23 November 2020 (Note: Left during controversies within the party)	
Maarten Hijink	SP	23 March 2017	30 March 2021	
Kirsten van den Hul	PvdA	23 March 2017	30 March 2021	
Chris Jansen	PVV	27 November 2019	30 March 2021	
Rob Jetten	D66	23 March 2017	30 March 2021	
Léon de Jong	PVV	23 March 2017	30 March 2021	
Sadet Karabulut	SP	23 March 2017	30 March 2021	
Mona Keijzer	CDA	23 March 2017	25 October 2017	
Bart van Kent	SP	23 March 2017	30 March 2021	
John Kerstens	PvdA	5 June 2018	30 March 2021	
Jesse Klaver	GL	23 March 2017	30 March 2021	
Raymond Knops	CDA	23 March 2017	25 October 2017	
Daniel Koerhuis	VVD	23 March 2017	30 March 2021	
Nine Kooiman	SP	23 March 2017	30 March 2018 (Note: Left to improve work-life balance)	
Wouter Koolmees	D66	23 March 2017	25 October 2017	
Sven Koopmans	VVD	23 March 2017	30 March 2021	
Femke Merel van Kooten-Arissen	PvdD (Note: Between 23 March 2017 and 14 October 2018, and between 4 February 2019 and 16 July 2019)	23 March 2017	14 October 2018	
Femke Merel van Kooten-Arissen	PvdD	4 February 2019	30 March 2021	
Femke Merel van Kooten-Arissen	Van Kooten-Arissen (Note: Between 16 July 2019 and 6 May 2020)	4 February 2019	30 March 2021	
Femke Merel van Kooten-Arissen	Krol/Van Kooten (Note: Between 6 May 2020 and 8 August 2020)	4 February 2019	30 March 2021	
Femke Merel van Kooten-Arissen	Van Kooten-Arissen (Note: Since 8 August 2020)	4 February 2019	30 March 2021	
Alexander Kops	PVV	23 March 2017	30 March 2021	
Suzanne Kröger	GL	23 March 2017	30 March 2021	
Henk Krol	50+ (Note: Until 6 May 2020)	23 March 2017	30 March 2021	
Henk Krol	Krol/Van Kooten (Note: Between 6 May 2020 and 8 August 2020)	23 March 2017	30 March 2021	
Henk Krol	Krol (Note: Since 8 August 2020)	23 March 2017	30 March 2021	
Anne Kuik	CDA	23 March 2017	30 March 2021	
Attje Kuiken	PvdA	23 March 2017	30 March 2021	
Tunahan Kuzu	DENK	23 March 2017	30 March 2021	
Peter Kwint	SP	23 March 2017	30 March 2021	
Antoinette Laan-Geselschap	VVD	31 October 2017	30 March 2021	
Cem Laçin	SP	23 March 2017	30 March 2021	
Leendert de Lange	VVD	31 October 2017	2 July 2019 (Note: Left to become mayor of Wassenaar)	
Tom van der Lee	GL	23 March 2017	30 March 2021	
Renske Leijten	SP	23 March 2017	30 March 2021	
Roald van der Linde	VVD	7 September 2017	30 March 2021	
Helma Lodders	VVD	23 March 2017	30 March 2021	
Barry Madlener	PVV	23 March 2017	30 March 2021	
Vicky Maeijer	PVV	23 March 2017	7 December 2020	
Vicky Maeijer	PVV	30 March 2021	30 March 2021	
Lilian Marijnissen	SP	23 March 2017	30 March 2021	
Gidi Markuszower	PVV	23 March 2017	30 March 2021	
Maurits von Martels	CDA	23 March 2017	30 March 2021	
Paul van Meenen	D66	23 March 2017	30 March 2021	
Jan Middendorp	VVD	23 March 2017	30 March 2021	
Harry van der Molen	CDA	23 March 2017	30 March 2021	
William Moorlag	PvdA	25 October 2017	30 March 2021	
Agnes Mulder	CDA	23 March 2017	30 March 2021	
Anne Mulder	VVD	23 March 2017	17 September 2020 (Note: Left to become alderman in The Hague)	
Edgar Mulder	PVV	23 March 2017	30 March 2021	
Tom van den Nieuwenhuijzen	GL	7 May 2020	30 March 2021	
Henk Nijboer	PvdA	23 March 2017	30 March 2021	
Chantal Nijkerken-de Haan	VVD	23 March 2017	30 March 2021	
Michiel van Nispen	SP	23 March 2017	30 March 2021	
Bram van Ojik	GL	23 March 2017	30 March 2021	
Pieter Omtzigt	CDA	23 March 2017	30 March 2021	
Foort van Oosten	VVD	23 March 2017	19 February 2019 (Note: Left to become mayor of Nissewaard)	
Esther Ouwehand	PvdD	23 March 2017	30 March 2021	
Gerrit-Jan van Otterloo	50+	11 June 2019	30 March 2021	
Zihni Özdil	GL	23 March 2017	3 June 2019 (Note: Left after breach of trust in the faction)	
Selçuk Öztürk	DENK	23 March 2017	30 March 2021	
Nevin Özütok	GL	23 March 2017	30 March 2021	
Hilde Palland	CDA	29 May 2019	30 March 2021	
Jan Paternotte	D66	23 March 2017	30 March 2021	
Alexander Pechtold	D66	23 March 2017	9 October 2018	
René Peters	CDA	23 March 2017	30 March 2021	
Lilianne Ploumen	PvdA	23 March 2017	30 March 2021	
Gabriëlle Popken	PVV	23 March 2017	30 March 2018	
Gabriëlle Popken	PVV	21 July 2018	30 August 2020 (Note: Left for personal reasons)	
Wytske Postma	CDA	5 June 2019	30 March 2021	
Ronald van Raak	SP	23 March 2017	30 March 2021	
Lammert van Raan	PvdD	23 March 2017	30 March 2021	
Rens Raemakers	D66	23 March 2017	13 January 2020 (Note: Went on sick leave)	
Rens Raemakers	D66	13 May 2020	30 March 2021	
Kelly Regterschot	VVD	25 June 2019	30 March 2021	
Wim-Jan Renkema	GL	13 June 2018	30 March 2021	
Emile Roemer	SP	23 March 2017	17 January 2018	
Michel Rog	CDA	23 March 2017	10 January 2021	
Erik Ronnes	CDA	23 March 2017	18 May 2020	
Martin van Rooijen	50+	23 March 2017	9 June 2019 (Note: Elected to the Senate)	
Raymond de Roon	PVV	23 March 2017	30 March 2021	
Arno Rutte	VVD	23 March 2017	12 October 2019	
Mark Rutte	VVD	23 March 2017	25 October 2017	
Léonie Sazias	50+	23 March 2017	5 November 2018	
Léonie Sazias	50+	27 February 2019	5 March 2019	
Léonie Sazias	50+	27 June 2019	30 March 2021	
Rutger Schonis	D66	10 October 2018	30 March 2021	
Carola Schouten	CU	23 March 2017	25 October 2017	
Gert-Jan Segers	CU	23 March 2017	30 March 2021	
Matthijs Sienot	D66	31 October 2017	30 March 2021	
Sjoerd Sjoerdsma	D66	23 March 2017	30 March 2021	
Evert-Jan Slootweg	CDA	31 October 2017	30 March 2021	
Bart Smals	VVD	3 July 2019	12 October 2019 (Note: Temporarily replaced Bente Becker)	
Bart Smals	VVD	15 October 2019	30 March 2021	
Paul Smeulders	GL	7 June 2018	30 March 2021	
Joost Sneller	D66	31 October 2017	30 March 2021	
Bart Snels	GL	23 March 2017	30 March 2021	
Mark Snoeren	VVD	22 September 2020	30 March 2021	
Kees van der Staaij	SGP	23 March 2017	30 March 2021	
Chris Stoffer	SGP	11 April 2018	30 March 2021	
Ockje Tellegen	VVD	23 March 2017	30 March 2021	
Julius Terpstra	CDA	20 May 2020	30 March 2021	
Christine Teunissen	PvdD	11 October 2018	29 January 2019 (Note: Temporarily replaced Marianne Thieme)	
Marianne Thieme	PvdD	23 March 2017	10 October 2018	
Marianne Thieme	PvdD	30 January 2019	8 October 2019	
Judith Tielen	VVD	31 October 2017	30 March 2021	
Liesbeth van Tongeren	GL	23 March 2017	12 June 2018	
Madeleine van Toorenburg	CDA	23 March 2017	30 March 2021	
Stientje van Veldhoven	D66	23 March 2017	25 October 2017	
Hayke Veldman	VVD	31 October 2017	30 March 2021	
Kees Verhoeven	D66	23 March 2017	30 March 2021	
Barbara Visser	VVD	23 March 2017	25 October 2017	
Joël Voordewind	CU	23 March 2017	30 March 2021	
Linda Voortman	GL	23 March 2017	5 June 2018 (Note: Left to become alderman of Utrecht)	
Henk de Vree	PVV	8 December 2020	29 March 2021	
Aukje de Vries	VVD	23 March 2017	30 March 2021	
Frank Wassenberg	PvdD	23 March 2017	30 March 2021	
Danai van Weerdenburg	PVV	23 March 2017	30 March 2021	
Lisa Westerveld	GL	23 March 2017	30 March 2021	
Arne Weverling	VVD	23 March 2017	30 March 2021	
Steven van Weyenberg	D66	23 March 2017	30 March 2021	
Dennis Wiersma	VVD	23 March 2017	30 March 2021	
Jeroen van Wijngaarden	VVD	20 February 2019	30 March 2021	
Geert Wilders	PVV	23 March 2017	30 March 2021	
Martin Wörsdörfer	VVD	23 March 2017	30 March 2021	
Bas van 't Wout	VVD	23 March 2017	1 July 2020	
Dilan Yeşilgöz-Zegerius	VVD	23 March 2017	30 March 2021	
Erik Ziengs	VVD	23 March 2017	30 March 2021	
Halbe Zijlstra	VVD	23 March 2017	25 October 2017	

== See also ==
- List of candidates in the 2017 Dutch general election
