= List of candidates in the 2017 Dutch general election =

Prior to the 2017 Dutch general election, contesting parties put forward party lists.

== 1: People's Party for Freedom and Democracy ==
Candidate list for the People's Party for Freedom and Democracy
| Number | Candidate | Votes | Result |
|---|---|---|---|
| 1 | Mark Rutte | 1,760,117 | Elected |
| 2 | Jeanine Hennis-Plasschaert | 148,431 | Elected |
| 3 | Halbe Zijlstra | 20,307 | Elected |
| 4 | Tamara van Ark | 13,557 | Elected |
| 5 | Klaas Dijkhoff | 146,226 | Elected |
| 6 | Sander Dekker | 2,810 | Elected |
| 7 | Barbara Visser | 9,220 | Elected |
| 8 | Mark Harbers | 2,846 | Elected |
| 9 | Han ten Broeke | 12,447 | Elected |
| 10 | Malik Azmani | 3,127 | Elected |
| 11 | Dennis Wiersma | 2,414 | Elected |
| 12 | Helma Lodders | 5,459 | Elected |
| 13 | Bas van 't Wout | 1,072 | Elected |
| 14 | Bente Becker | 4,288 | Elected |
| 15 | Pieter Duisenberg | 2,022 | Elected |
| 16 | Sophie Hermans | 4,417 | Elected |
| 17 | Anne Mulder | 1,293 | Elected |
| 18 | Aukje de Vries | 5,795 | Elected |
| 19 | Dilan Yesilgöz-Zegerius | 5,643 | Elected |
| 20 | Arno Rutte | 4,713 | Elected |
| 21 | Ockje Tellegen | 3,444 | Elected |
| 22 | Daniel Koerhuis | 441 | Elected |
| 23 | Erik Ziengs | 5,180 | Elected |
| 24 | André Bosman | 2,079 | Elected |
| 25 | Albert van den Bosch | 1,421 | Elected |
| 26 | Zohair El Yassini | 947 | Elected |
| 27 | Remco Dijkstra | 1,381 | Elected |
| 28 | Martin Wörsdörfer | 1,370 | Elected |
| 29 | Arne Weverling | 8,588 | Elected |
| 30 | Chantal Nijkerken-de Haan | 12,761 | Elected |
| 31 | Sjoerd Potters | 836 | Elected, but declined |
| 32 | Foort van Oosten | 575 | Elected |
| 33 | Sven Koopmans | 704 | Elected |
| 34 | Jan Middendorp | 600 | Replacement |
| 35 | Roald van der Linde | 840 | Replacement |
| 36 | Joost van Keulen | 1,335 | |
| 37 | Antoinette Laan-Geselschap | 2,262 | Replacement |
| 38 | Judith Tielen | 1,928 | Replacement |
| 39 | Hayke Veldman | 1,180 | Replacement |
| 40 | Rudmer Heerema | 3,140 | Replacement |
| 41 | Wybren van Haga | 2,156 | Replacement |
| 42 | Leendert de Lange | 917 | Replacement |
| 43 | Tobias van Gent | 388 | Replacement |
| 44 | Jeroen de Veth | 370 | |
| 45 | Jeroen van Wijngaarden | 336 | Replacement |
| 46 | Thierry Aartsen | 1,342 | Replacement |
| 47 | Kelly Regterschot | 1,958 | Replacement |
| 48 | Bart Smals | 569 | Replacement |
| 49 | Mirjam Pauwels-Paauw | 2,743 | |
| 50 | Martijn Bolkestein | 735 | Replacement |
| 51 | Mark Snoeren | 1,906 | Replacement |
| 52 | Jacco Heemskerk | 643 | |
| 53 | Wendelien Tönjann-Levert | 830 | |
| 54 | Robert van Rijn | 458 | |
| 55 | Jan de Reus | 325 | |
| 56 | Rosemarijn Dral | 924 | |
| 57 | Irene Korting | 648 | |
| 58 | Kathy Arends-Drijver | 450 | |
| 59 | Krijn Lock | 1,025 | |
| 60 | Falco Hoekstra | 615 | |
| 61 | André van Schie | 206 | |
| 62 | Erik Struijlaart | 230 | |
| 63 | Tanja Haseloop-Amsing | 752 | |
| 64 | Barry Jacobs | 672 | |
| 65 | Jenny Elbertsen | 659 | |
| 66 | Saskia van Dijk | 752 | |
| 67 | Jasper Mos | 284 | |
| 68 | Linda Böcker | 227 | |
| 69 | Roeland de Rijk | 133 | |
| 70 | Yvonne Welter | 615 | |
| 71 | Nick Derks | 1,037 | |
| 72 | Miranda Joziasse | 327 | |
| 73 | Harry Bevers | 408 | |
| 74 | Anja Prins | 616 | |
| 75 | Hennie Huisman-Peelen | 511 | |
| 76 | Laurine Bonnevits-de Jong | 898 | |
| 77 | Dylan Lochtenberg | 277 | |
| 78 | Crys Larson | 502 | |
| 79 | Frederik Zevenbergen | 474 | |
| 80 | Maarten van der Weijden | 2,217 | |

== 2: Labour Party ==
Candidate list for the Labour Party
| Number | Candidate | Votes | Result |
|---|---|---|---|
| 1 | Lodewijk Asscher | 353,777 | Elected |
| 2 | Khadija Arib | 48,440 | Elected |
| 3 | Jeroen Dijsselbloem | 51,695 | Elected |
| 4 | Sharon Dijksma | 35,836 | Elected |
| 5 | Gijs van Dijk | 1,860 | Elected |
| 6 | Attje Kuiken | 5,949 | Elected |
| 7 | Henk Nijboer | 5,151 | Elected |
| 8 | Kirsten van den Hul | 2,253 | Elected |
| 9 | William Moorlag | 3,741 | Replacement |
| 10 | Lilianne Ploumen | 21,990 | Elected |
| 11 | John Kerstens | 1,396 | Replacement |
| 12 | Joke de Kock | 3,178 | |
| 13 | Ahmed Marcouch | 4,388 | |
| 14 | Marith Volp | 4,079 | |
| 15 | Richard Moti | 2,955 | |
| 16 | Keklik Yücel | 3,850 | |
| 17 | Michiel Servaes | 628 | |
| 18 | Emine Bozkurt | 1,611 | |
| 19 | Ilco van der Linde | 654 | |
| 20 | Christa Oosterbaan | 5,512 | |
| 21 | Mohammed Mohandis | 766 | |
| 22 | Loes Ypma | 2,409 | |
| 23 | Jeroen Recourt | 610 | |
| 24 | Marit Maij | 1,009 | |
| 25 | Martijn de Kort | 603 | |
| 26 | Reshma Roopram | 2,612 | |
| 27 | Duco Hoogland | 279 | |
| 28 | Giselle Schellekens | 1,239 | |
| 29 | Albert de Vries | 590 | |
| 30 | Mirthe Biemans | 607 | |
| 31 | Harm Brouwer | 385 | |
| 32 | Mei Li Vos | 1,847 | |
| 33 | Joost Reinaerts | 1,061 | |
| 34 | Bouchra Dibi | 702 | |
| 35 | Bas van Drooge | 177 | |
| 36 | Amma Asante | 2,419 | |
| 37 | Emre Ünver | 426 | |
| 38 | Joyce Vermue | 1,420 | |
| 39 | Tjeerd van Dekken | 984 | |
| 40 | Anna-Lena Hedin-Penninx | 766 | |
| 41 | Bob Deen | 178 | |
| 42 | Cindy Vorselman-Derksen | 812 | |
| 43 | Erik Pentenga | 81 | |
| 44 | Anna van den Boogaard | 384 | |
| 45 | Roelof van Laar | 173 | |
| 46 | Tamar Schrofer | 171 | |
| 47 | Heino van Houwelingen | 89 | |
| 48 | Marinka Mulder | 314 | |
| 49 | Wimar Bolhuis | 130 | |
| 50 | Sultan Günal-Gezer | 408 | |
| 51 | Jelmer Staal | 1,973 | |
| 52 | Els Boot | 876 | |
| 53 | Mohammed Chahim | 326 | |
| 54 | Petra Koenders | 666 | |
| 55 | Roy Breederveld | 108 | |
| 56 | Laura Menenti | 255 | |
| 57 | Richard van de Burgt | 226 | |
| 58 | Lou Repetur | 168 | |
| 59 | Saami Akrouh | 123 | |
| 60 | Anita Engbers | 171 | |
| 61 | Thomas Ronnes | 129 | |
| 62 | Peggy Wijntuin | 548 | |
| 63 | Luc Brouwers | 124 | |
| 64 | Anja van Zantvoort | 165 | |
| 65 | Fred Cohen | 195 | |
| 66 | Anne Dankert | 135 | |
| 67 | Hafid Bouteibi | 239 | |
| 68 | Ivonne Voigt | 301 | |
| 69 | Jan Schuurman Hess | 71 | |
| 70 | Denise Klomp | 140 | |
| 71 | Marco Keizer | 186 | |
| 72 | Tirza Houben | 299 | |
| 73 | Eric van ’t Zelfde | 372 | |
| 74 | Sandra Doevendans | 144 | |
| 75-80 | Regional candidates | | |

=== Regional candidates ===
Regional candidates for Labour Party
| Candidate | Votes | Result | Position | | | | | | | | | | | | | | | | | | | |
| Candidate | Votes | Result | Groningen | Leeuwarden | Assen | Zwolle | Lelystad | Nijmegen | Arnhem | Utrecht | Amsterdam | Haarlem | Den Helder | Den Haag | Rotterdam | Dordrecht | Leiden | Middelburg | Tilburg | Den Bosch | Maastricht | Bonaire |
|---|---|---|---|---|---|---|---|---|---|---|---|---|---|---|---|---|---|---|---|---|---|---|
| Hedy d'Ancona | 66 | | | | | | | | | | 76 | | | | | | | | | | | 76 |
| Petri d'Anjou- Lems | 28 | | | | | | | | | | | | | | | | | 76 | | | | |
| Maaike Baggerman | 44 | | | | | | | 76 | | | | | | | | | | | | | | |
| Marleen Barth | 15 | | | | | | | | | | | | | | | | 76 | | | | | |
| Ahmed Baâdoud | 143 | | | | | | | | | | 77 | | | | | | | | | | | |
| Bea van Beers | 70 | | | | | | | | | | | | | | | | | | 76 | | | |
| Bahreddine Belhaj | 17 | | | | | | 76 | | | | | | | | | | | | | | | |
| Jacqueline van den Bergh | 112 | | | | | | | | | | | | | | | 76 | | | | | | |
| Harry van den Bergh | 63 | | | | | | | | | | | 80 | | | | | | | | | | |
| Marja Bijl | 43 | | | | | | | | | | | | | | 76 | | | | | | | |
| Cees Bijl | 404 | | | | 77 | | | | | | | | | | | | | | | | | |
| Carine Bloemhoff | 230 | | 76 | | | | | | | | | | | | | | | | | | | |
| Jesse Bos | 25 | | | | | | | | | | 78 | | | | | | | | | | | |
| Gadiza Bouazani | 58 | | | | | | | | | 76 | | | | | | | | | | | | |
| Laura Bouwmeester | 144 | | | | | | 77 | | | | | | | | | | | | | | | |
| Joop Brink | 62 | | | | 78 | | | | | | | | | | | | | | | | | |
| Laura Broekhuizen-Smit | 126 | | 78 | | | | | | | | | | | | | | | | | | | |
| Jacques Costongs | 221 | | | | | | | | | | | | | | | | | | | | 76 | |
| Marleen Damen | 54 | | | | | | | | | | | | | | | | 78 | | | | | |
| Frank Depla | 149 | | | | | | | | | | | | | | | | | | | 76 | | |
| Jean Eigeman | 14 | | | | | | | 77 | | | | | | | | | | | | | | |
| Andries Ekhart | 155 | | | 77 | | | | | | | | | | | | | | | | | | |
| Trees Flapper | 107 | | | 76 | | | | | | | | | | | | | | | | | | |
| Marco Florijn | 30 | | | | | | | | | | | | | | 79 | | | | | | | |
| Flora Goudappel | 45 | | | | | | | | | | | | | | 78 | | | | | | | |
| Ehssane Gounou | 45 | | | | | | | | | | | | | | | | | | | 77 | | |
| Jos Harmelink | 72 | | | | | 76 | | | | | | | | | | | | | | | | |
| Tjeerd Herrema | 20 | | | | | | 78 | | | | | | | | | | | | | | | |
| Leon Heuvelmans | 111 | | | | | | | | | | | | | | | | | | | | 77 | |
| Pieter Hilhorst | 11 | | | | | | | | | | 79 | | | | | | | | | | | |
| Ron Hillebrand | 27 | | | | | | | | | | | | | | | | 77 | | | | | |
| Paulien van der Hoeven | 15 | | | | | | | | | | | | | 76 | | | | | | | | |
| Trijntje Hummel | 142 | | | | 76 | | | | | | | | | | | | | | | | | |
| Fleur Imming | 138 | | | | | | | | | 79 | | | | | | | | | | | | |
| René Isselman | 48 | | | | | | | | 77 | | | | | | | | | | | | | |
| Judith de Jong | 154 | | | | | | | | | | | | 76 | | | | | | | | | |
| Arie de Jong | 23 | | | | | | | | | | | | | | | | 79 | | | | | |
| Annelies de Jonge | 139 | | | | | | | | 76 | | | | | | | | | | | | | |
| Kees Jongmans | 63 | | | | | | | | | | | | | | | | | | 79 | | | |
| Marga Jonkman | 109 | | | | | | | | 78 | | | | | | | | | | | | | |
| Paula Jorritsma | 22 | | | | | | | | | | | | | | | | | | 78 | | | |
| Harry Keereweer | 29 | | | | | | | 78 | | | | | | | | | | | | | | |
| Jan-Willem van de Kolk | 73 | | 77 | | | | | | | | | | | | | | | | | | | |
| Anne Koning | 97 | | | | | | | | | | | | | | | 77 | | | | | | |
| Johan Kruithof | 71 | | | | | | | | 79 | | | | | | | | | | | | | |
| Joyce Langenacker | 82 | | | | | | | | | | | 76 | | | | | | | | | | |
| John Leerdam | 56 | | | | | | | | | | 80 | | | | | | | | | | | 77 |
| Cees Liefting | 84 | | | | | | | | | | | | | | | | | 77 | | | | |
| Dorus Luyckx | 41 | | | | | | | | | | | | 77 | | | | | | | | | |
| Chris Maas | 31 | | | | | | | | | | | | | | | | | 78 | | | | |
| Remco van Maurik | 24 | | | 79 | | | | | | | | | | | | | | | | | | |
| Josan Meijers | 40 | | | | | | | 79 | | | | | | | | | | | | | | |
| Conny Miermans | 35 | | | | | | | | | | | | | | | | | 79 | | | | |
| Willem Minderhout | 20 | | | | | | | | | | | | | 77 | | | | | | | | |
| Jeltje van Nieuwenhoven | 44 | | | | | | | | | | | | | 78 | | | | | | | | |
| Gerard Nieuwenhuis | 15 | | | | | | | 80 | | | | | | | | | | | | | | |
| Piet de Noord | 54 | | | | | 77 | | | | | | | | | | | | | | | | |
| Jeroen Olthof | 106 | | | | | | | | | | | | 78 | | | | | | | | | |
| Birgit Op de Laak | 204 | | | | | | | | | | | | | | | | | | | | 78 | |
| Hélène Oppatja | 121 | | | | | | | | | | | | | | | | 80 | | | | | |
| Wanda Ottens | 83 | | | 78 | | | | | | | | | | | | | | | | | | |
| Hans van Oudheusden | 30 | | | | | | | | | | | | | | 80 | | | | | | | |
| Gerrit Overmans | 32 | | | | | | | | | | | | | | | | | | | 78 | | |
| Peter Pels | 25 | | | | | | 80 | | | | | | | | | | | | | | | |
| Kati Piri | 15 | | | | | | | | | | | | | 79 | | | | | | | | |
| Ben Plandsoen | 31 | | 79 | | | | | | | | | | | | | | | | | | | |
| Farida Polsbroek | 44 | | | | | | | | | | | 77 | | | | | | | | | | |
| Robin Reichrath | 270 | | | | | | | | | | | | | | | | | | | | 79 | |
| Dick Rensen | 30 | | | | | | | | | | | | | | | 78 | | | | | | |
| Houkje Rijpstra | 247 | | | 80 | | | | | | | | | | | | | | | | | | |
| Bé Schollema | 173 | | 80 | | | | | | | | | | | | | | | | | | | |
| Jan Smeets | 176 | | | | | | | | | | | | | | | | | | | | 80 | |
| Stijn Smeulders | 59 | | | | | | | | | | | | | | | | | | | 79 | | |
| Albert Smit | 109 | | | | 79 | | | | | | | | | | | | | | | | | |
| Hans Spekman | 134 | | | | | | | | | 80 | | | | | | | | | | | | 78 |
| Gaston Sporre | 104 | | | | | 78 | | | | | | | | | | | | | | | | |
| Mario Stam | 53 | | | | | | | | | | | | | | | 79 | | | | | | |
| Wouter Struijk | 216 | | | | | | | | | | | | | | | 80 | | | | | | |
| Saskia Szarafinski | 79 | | | | | | | | | | | | | | | | | 80 | | | | |
| Nicole Teeuwen | 50 | | | | | | | | | 77 | | | | | | | | | | | | |
| Xander den Uyl | 38 | | | | | | | | | | | 78 | | | | | | | | | | 79 |
| Nelleke Vedelaar | 307 | | | | | 79 | | | | | | | | | | | | | | | | |
| Rien van der Velde | 35 | | | | | | 79 | | | | | | | | | | | | | | | |
| Ronald Vennik | 5 | | | | | | | | | | | | 79 | | | | | | | | | |
| Roos Vermeij | 28 | | | | | | | | | | | | | 80 | | | | | | | | |
| Lars Voskuil | 39 | | | | | | | | | | | 79 | | | | | | | | | | |
| Steven de Waal | 16 | | | | | | | | | 78 | | | | | | | | | | | | |
| Ed Wagemaker | 70 | | | | | | | | | | | | 80 | | | | | | | | | |
| Ed Wallinga | 168 | | | | | 80 | | | | | | | | | | | | | | | | |
| Rita Weeda | 80 | | | | | | | | 80 | | | | | | | | | | | | | |
| Tine van de Weijer | 130 | | | | | | | | | | | | | | | | | | 80 | | | |
| Alex Wekema | 130 | | | | 80 | | | | | | | | | | | | | | | | | |
| Jeroen Weyers | 56 | | | | | | | | | | | | | | | | | | | 80 | | |
| Marjolein de Wit-Greuter | 0 | | | | | | | | | | | | | | | | | | | | | 80 |
| Yusuf Çelik | 74 | | | | | | | | | | | | | | | | | | 77 | | | |
| Metin Çelik | 64 | | | | | | | | | | | | | | 77 | | | | | | | |

== 3: Party for Freedom ==
Candidate list for the Party for Freedom
| Number | Candidate | Votes | Result |
|---|---|---|---|
| 1 | Geert Wilders | 1,258,989 | Elected |
| 2 | Fleur Agema | 71,229 | Elected |
| 3 | Vicky Maeijer | 6,751 | Elected |
| 4 | Gidi Markuszower | 1,101 | Elected |
| 5 | Sietse Fritsma | 1,013 | Elected |
| 6 | Martin Bosma | 6,430 | Elected |
| 7 | Barry Madlener | 987 | Elected |
| 8 | Teun van Dijck | 416 | Elected |
| 9 | Lilian Helder | 3,130 | Elected |
| 10 | Harm Beertema | 515 | Elected |
| 11 | Machiel de Graaf | 619 | Elected |
| 12 | Dion Graus | 3,725 | Elected |
| 13 | Raymond de Roon | 269 | Elected |
| 14 | Danai van Weerdenburg | 639 | Elected |
| 15 | Edgar Mulder | 1,127 | Elected |
| 16 | Karen Gerbrands | 545 | Elected |
| 17 | Léon de Jong | 291 | Elected |
| 18 | Gabriëlle Popken | 390 | Elected |
| 19 | Alexander Kops | 679 | Elected |
| 20 | Roy van Aalst | 1,524 | Elected |
| 21 | Emiel van Dijk | 599 | Replacement |
| 22 | Robert Housmans | 904 | |
| 23 | Chris Jansen | 382 | Replacement |
| 24 | Henk de Vree | 257 | Replacement |
| 25 | Max Aardema | 1,593 | |
| 26 | Toon van Dijk | 270 | |
| 27 | Daniëlle de Winter | 901 | |
| 28 | Ilse Bezaan | 275 | |
| 29 | Joyce Kardol | 1,205 | |
| 30 | Elmar Vlottes | 381 | |
| 31 | Rob de Jong | 332 | |
| 32 | An van Pijkeren | 215 | |
| 33 | Jeffrey Rijken | 341 | |
| 34 | Han IJssennagger | 99 | |
| 35 | Henk van Deún | 360 | |
| 36 | Tim Vermeer | 90 | |
| 37 | Olaf Buitelaar | 82 | |
| 38 | Tessa Dulfer | 362 | |
| 39 | Maikel Boon | 413 | |
| 40 | Ed Braam | 211 | |
| 41 | Menno Ludriks | 90 | |
| 42 | Nathalie Choenni | 612 | |
| 43 | Louis Roks | 413 | |
| 44 | Folkert Thiadens | 240 | |
| 45 | Elias van Hees | 91 | |
| 46 | Caroline Kooman | 570 | |
| 47 | Dannij van der Sluijs | 222 | |
| 48 | Alexander van Hattem | 205 | |
| 49 | Olaf Stuger | 129 | |
| 50 | Gom van Strien | 728 | |

== 4: Socialist Party ==
Candidate list for the Socialist Party
| Number | Candidate | Votes | Result |
|---|---|---|---|
| 1 | Emile Roemer | 675,763 | Elected |
| 2 | Renske Leijten | 57,956 | Elected |
| 3 | Lilian Marijnissen | 124,626 | Elected |
| 4 | Ronald van Raak | 4,378 | Elected |
| 5 | Sadet Karabulut | 13,540 | Elected |
| 6 | Sandra Beckerman | 15,575 | Elected |
| 7 | Michiel van Nispen | 2,261 | Elected |
| 8 | Peter Kwint | 1,011 | Elected |
| 9 | Bart van Kent | 957 | Elected |
| 10 | Cem Laçin | 3,069 | Elected |
| 11 | Frank Futselaar | 2,264 | Elected |
| 12 | Nine Kooiman | 4,919 | Elected |
| 13 | Maarten Hijink | 649 | Elected |
| 14 | Jasper van Dijk | 1,343 | Elected |
| 15 | Eric Smaling | 1,010 | |
| 16 | Mahir Alkaya | 1,243 | Replacement |
| 17 | Henk van Gerven | 981 | Replacement |
| 18 | Diederik Olders | 813 | |
| 19 | Ton Heerschop | 1,761 | |
| 20 | Ad Meijer | 1,218 | |
| 21 | Bas Maes | 546 | |
| 22 | Ron Meyer | 6,855 | |
| 23 | Sun Yoon van Dijk-van Leeuwen | 4,092 | |
| 24 | Daniël de Wit | 363 | |
| 25 | Bert Peterse | 981 | |
| 26 | Arnout Hoekstra | 436 | |
| 27 | Hans Boerwinkel | 1,029 | |
| 28 | Patty Hamerslag | 1,589 | |
| 29 | Bram Buskoop | 270 | |
| 30 | Nicole Temmink | 766 | |
| 31 | Nina de Ridder | 850 | |
| 32 | Denise van Sluijs | 631 | |
| 33 | Aïsha Akhiat | 1,010 | |
| 34 | Nicole van Gemert | 456 | |
| 35 | Jimmy Dijk | 1,086 | |
| 36 | Anita de Vos | 568 | |
| 37 | Ineke Bekkering | 991 | |
| 38 | Inez Staarink | 294 | |
| 39 | Nils Müller | 376 | |
| 40 | Fenna Feenstra | 2,192 | |
| 41 | Marcel Olierook | 179 | |
| 42 | Mariska ten Heuw | 2,029 | |
| 43 | Renske Helmer-Englebert | 1,061 | |
| 44 | Arjan Vliegenthart | 340 | |
| 45-49 | Regional candidates | | |
| 50 | Remi Poppe | 1,088 | |

=== Regional candidates ===
Regional candidates for Socialist Party
| Candidate | Votes | Result | Position | | | | |
| Candidate | Votes | Result | Groningen, Leeuwarden, Assen, Zwolle | Lelystad, Nijmegen, Arnhem, Utrecht | Amsterdam, Haarlem, Den Helder | Den Haag, Rotterdam, Dordrecht, Leiden, Bonaire | Middelburg, Tilburg, Den Bosch, Maastricht |
|---|---|---|---|---|---|---|---|
| Lies van Aelst | 236 | | | | | 48 | |
| Remine Alberts-Oosterbaan | 95 | | | | 46 | | |
| Jan Baas | 141 | | | | | 47 | |
| Marleen van Dam | 356 | | | | 49 | | |
| Nel Douw-van Dam | 274 | | | | 45 | | |
| Annelies Futselaar | 1,136 | | 49 | | | | |
| Roos van Gelderen | 374 | | | | | 49 | |
| Rosita van Gijlswijk | 803 | | 45 | | | | |
| Tjitske Hoekstra | 74 | | | 45 | | | |
| Hasan Inekci | 168 | | | 47 | | | |
| Hillie de Koe | 576 | | 48 | | | | |
| Patrick van Lunteren | 191 | | | | | | 46 |
| Anne-Marie Mineur | 127 | | | 48 | | | |
| Ellis Müller | 441 | | | 46 | | | |
| Jan Raaimakers | 146 | | | | | | 47 |
| Marleen van Rijnsbergen | 1,821 | | | | | | 49 |
| Annemiek Roes | 421 | | | 49 | | | |
| Lieke van Rossum | 267 | | | | | 45 | |
| Harry Rozema | 418 | | 47 | | | | |
| Esther Schut | 444 | | 46 | | | | |
| Ger van Unen | 373 | | | | | | 45 |
| Krista van Velzen | 218 | | | | | 46 | |
| Bianca Verweij | 220 | | | | 48 | | |
| Nathalie van der Zanden-van der Weijden | 716 | | | | | | 48 |
| Patrick Zoomermeijer | 182 | | | | 47 | | |

== 5: Christian Democratic Appeal ==
Candidate list for the Christian Democratic Appeal
| Number | Candidate | Votes | Result |
|---|---|---|---|
| 1 | Sybrand van Haersma Buma | 788,073 | Elected |
| 2 | Mona Keijzer | 165,384 | Elected |
| 3 | René Peters | 11,270 | Elected |
| 4 | Pieter Omtzigt | 97,638 | Elected |
| 5 | Madeleine van Toorenburg | 20,194 | Elected |
| 6 | Raymond Knops | 12,876 | Elected |
| 7 | Pieter Heerma | 1,584 | Elected |
| 8 | Harry van der Molen | 8,636 | Elected |
| 9 | Hanke Bruins Slot | 7,330 | Elected |
| 10 | Jaco Geurts | 17,058 | Elected |
| 11 | Anne Kuik | 15,906 | Elected |
| 12 | Chris van Dam | 1,441 | Elected |
| 13 | Agnes Mulder | 12,013 | Elected |
| 14 | Michel Rog | 1,823 | Elected |
| 15 | Mustafa Amhaouch | 4,006 | Elected |
| 16 | Martijn van Helvert | 19,106 | Elected |
| 17 | Erik Ronnes | 5,567 | Elected |
| 18 | Joba van den Berg-Jansen | 3,551 | Elected |
| 19 | Evert Jan Slootweg | 1,070 | Replacement |
| 20 | Lenny Geluk-Poortvliet | 2,962 | Replacement |
| 21 | Hilde Palland | 6,464 | Replacement |
| 22 | Wytske de Pater-Postma | 1,779 | Replacement |
| 23 | Julius Terpstra | 1,477 | Replacement |
| 24 | Stijn Steenbakkers | 2,169 | |
| 25 | Gerard van den Anker | 2,815 | Replacement |
| 26 | Vivianne Heijnen | 15,821 | |
| 27 | Sebastiaan den Bak | 475 | |
| 28 | Chris Schotman | 775 | |
| 29 | Arjan Erkel | 1,302 | |
| 30 | Karin Zwinkels | 8,768 | |
| 31 | Esther Hanemaaijer | 8,731 | |
| 32 | Jan Hutten | 843 | |
| 33 | Marischa Kip | 757 | |
| 34 | Eugène van Mierlo | 2,141 | |
| 35 | Ria de Korte | 1,505 | |
| 36 | Bob Bergkamp | 622 | |
| 37 | Jan-Jaap de Haan | 368 | |
| 38 | Jochgem van Opstal | 282 | |
| 39 | Barbara Gardeniers | 695 | |
| 40 | Mustafa Bal | 549 | |
| 41 | René Vrugt | 287 | |
| 42 | Bart van Dekken | 352 | |
| 43 | Wiljan Vloet | 450 | |
| 44 | Maurits von Martels | 21,510 | Elected |
| 45 | Roy van der Broek | 868 | |

=== Regional candidates ===
Regional candidates for Christian Democratic Appeal
| Candidate | Votes | Result | Position | | | | | | | | | | | | | | | | | |
| Candidate | Votes | Result | Groningen | Leeuwarden, Lelystad | Assen | Zwolle | Nijmegen, Arnhem | Utrecht | Amsterdam | Haarlem | Den Helder | Den Haag | Rotterdam | Dordrecht | Leiden | Middelburg | Tilburg | Den Bosch | Maastricht | Bonaire |
|---|---|---|---|---|---|---|---|---|---|---|---|---|---|---|---|---|---|---|---|---|
| Frits Alberts | 175 | | | | 48 | | | | | | | | | | | | | | | |
| Gert-Jan Bakker | 69 | | 46 | 46 | | | | 46 | | | | 46 | | 46 | 46 | | | | | 46 |
| Jo-Annes de Bat | 793 | | | | | | | | | | | | | | | 47 | | | | |
| Johanna Besteman | 146 | | | | | | | | | | | 47 | | 47 | 47 | | | | | |
| Bert Beun | 396 | | | | | 49 | | | | | | | | | | | | | | |
| Jaap Bond | 101 | | | | | | | | | 46 | 46 | | | | | | | | | |
| Paul Boogaard | 304 | | | | | | | | | | | | | 48 | | | | | | |
| Marc Breugelmans | 654 | | | | | | | | | | | | | | | | | | 48 | |
| Jeroen Bruijns | 536 | | | | | | | | | | | | | | | | 50 | | | |
| Mark Buck | 334 | | | | | | 48 | | | | | | | | | | | | | |
| Ronnie Buiks | 681 | | | | | | | | | | | | | | | | 46 | | | |
| Charles Claessens | 520 | | | | | | | | | | | | | | | | | | 47 | |
| Erik Dannenberg | 349 | | | | | 46 | | | | | | | | | | | | | | |
| Hans Demoed | 111 | | | | | | | | | | | | | | 49 | | | | | |
| Martijn Eelman | 139 | | | | | | | | | | 47 | | | | | | | | | |
| Christine Eskes | 142 | | | | | | | | | | | | 47 | | | | | | | |
| Thilla Franken | 150 | | | | 50 | | | | | | | | | | | | | | | |
| Jos van Ginneken | 866 | | | | | | | | | | | | | | | 48 | | | | |
| Alex Hallema | 74 | | | | | | | | | | | | 48 | | | | | | | |
| Willy Hanssen | 412 | | | | | | | | | | | | | | | | | 47 | | |
| Rogier Havelaar | 166 | | 47 | 48 | | | | 48 | 48 | 48 | 48 | | | | | | | | | 48 |
| Henk Helmantel | 209 | | 49 | | | | | | | | | | | | | | | | | |
| Marc Jager | 92 | | 48 | 47 | | | | 47 | | | | | | | | | | | | 47 |
| Hugo de Jonge | 83 | | | | | | | | | | | | 49 | | | | | | | |
| Karsten Klein | 67 | | | | | | | | | | | 49 | | | | | | | | |
| Jacob Knoops | 533 | | | | | | | | | | | | | | | | | | 46 | |
| Peter Koeman | 90 | | | | | | | | | | | | | | | 50 | | | | |
| Sven de Langen | 91 | | | | | | | | | | | | 46 | | | | | | | |
| Duco van Lanschot | 46 | | | | | | | | 46 | | | | | | | | | | | |
| Paul Leenders | 532 | | | | | | | | | | | | | | | | | 48 | | |
| Hannie van Leeuwen | 1,112 | | 50 | 50 | | | | | | 50 | 50 | 50 | 50 | 50 | 50 | | | | 50 | 50 |
| Frank Meerkerk | 392 | | | 49 | | | | 49 | | | | | | 49 | | | | | | |
| Patricia de Milliano | 400 | | | | | | | | | | | | | | | 46 | | | | |
| Theo Morskate | 431 | | | | | 48 | | | | | | | | | | | | | | |
| Klaas Neutel | 91 | | | | 49 | | | | | | | | | | | | | | | |
| Mariëtte Nooijens | 517 | | | | | | | | | | | | | | | | 48 | | | |
| Radj Ramcharan | 193 | | | | | | | 50 | | | | | | | | | | | | |
| Erik de Ridder | 614 | | | | | | | | | | | | | | | | 49 | | | |
| Jan Roefs | 507 | | | | | | | | | | | | | | | | | 46 | | |
| Steffi Rombouts | 38 | | | | | | | | 47 | | | | | | | | | | | |
| Bouwien Rutten | 803 | | | | | 50 | | | | | | | | | | | | | | |
| Marleen Sanderse | 168 | | | | | | | | | 49 | | | | | | | | | | |
| Ilse Saris | 2,046 | | | | | | 47 | | | | | | | | | | | | | |
| Emmaly Scheepstra | 86 | | | | 46 | | | | | | | | | | | | | | | |
| Koos Sneek | 385 | | | | | | | | | | | | | | | | | | | 49 |
| Lisanne Spanbroek | 302 | | | | | 47 | | | | | | | | | | | | | | |
| Hendrik Stals | 1,164 | | | | | | | | | | | | | | | | | | 49 | |
| Nathan Stukker | 543 | | | | | | 49 | | | | | | | | | | | | | |
| Abdulkadir Tanyildiz | 32 | | | | | | | | 50 | | | | | | | | | | | |
| Suzanne van Triest | 52 | | | | | | | | 49 | | | | | | | | | | | |
| Annemieke van de Ven | 533 | | | | | | | | | | | | | | | | | 49 | | |
| Hans Verbraak | 418 | | | | | | | | | | | | | | | | 47 | | | |
| Driek van de Vondervoort | 1,270 | | | | | | | | | | | | | | | | | 50 | | |
| Rob Wessels | 204 | | | | | | | | | | | 48 | | | 48 | | | | | |
| Hanneke Wiersema | 93 | | | | 47 | | | | | | | | | | | | | | | |
| Frank Wissink | 604 | | | | | | 46 | | | | | | | | | | | | | |
| Aagje Zeeman | 71 | | | | | | | | | | 49 | | | | | | | | | |
| Henk Zielstra | 130 | | | | | | | | | | | | | | | 49 | | | | |
| Harold Zoet | 355 | | | | | | 50 | | | | | | | | | | | | | |
| Fadime Şimşek | 88 | | | | | | | | | 47 | | | | | | | | | | |

== 6: Democrats 66 ==
Candidate list for Democrats 66
| Number | Candidate | Votes | Result |
|---|---|---|---|
| 1 | Alexander Pechtold | 863,887 | Elected |
| 2 | Stientje van Veldhoven | 92,700 | Elected |
| 3 | Wouter Koolmees | 11,606 | Elected |
| 4 | Pia Dijkstra | 120,557 | Elected |
| 5 | Ingrid van Engelshoven | 10,941 | Elected |
| 6 | Vera Bergkamp | 26,094 | Elected |
| 7 | Kees Verhoeven | 6,586 | Elected |
| 8 | Paul van Meenen | 2,961 | Elected |
| 9 | Jan Paternotte | 2,991 | Elected |
| 10 | Steven van Weyenberg | 1,280 | Elected |
| 11 | Sjoerd Sjoerdsma | 2,726 | Elected |
| 12 | Rob Jetten | 4,903 | Elected |
| 13 | Jessica van Eijs | 19,594 | Elected |
| 14 | Salima Belhaj | 13,833 | Elected |
| 15 | Maarten Groothuizen | 1,145 | Elected |
| 16 | Achraf Bouali | 3,489 | Elected |
| 17 | Rens Raemakers | 7,435 | Elected |
| 18 | Antje Diertens | 24,691 | Elected |
| 19 | Tjeerd de Groot | 1,825 | Elected |
| 20 | Monica den Boer | 13,582 | Replacement |
| 21 | Matthijs Sienot | 1,585 | Replacement |
| 22 | Joost Sneller | 547 | Replacement |
| 23 | Rutger Schonis | 992 | Replacement |
| 24 | Marijke van Beukering-Huijbregts | 4,971 | Replacement |
| 25 | Arend Meijer | 1,766 | |
| 26 | Franca Eurlings-Tonnaer | 5,983 | |
| 27 | Munish Ramlal | 1,938 | |
| 28 | Martine van Bemmel | 2,169 | |
| 29 | Kristie Lamers | 3,425 | |
| 30 | Jaimi van Essen | 5,705 | |
| 31 | Dina Verbrugge-Wormgoor | 1,076 | |
| 32 | Jeanet van der Laan | 1,588 | |
| 33 | Noureddine Zarroy | 791 | |
| 34 | Bastiaan Winkel | 272 | |
| 35 | Mpanzu Bamenga | 834 | |
| 36 | Noëlle Sanders | 1,288 | |
| 37 | Rachid Guernaoui | 379 | |
| 38 | Hülya Kat | 2,685 | |
| 39 | Eelco Keij | 3,614 | |
| 40 | Marijn Bosman | 1,499 | |
| 41 | Sietze Schukking | 1,263 | |
| 42 | Wibo Schepel | 262 | |
| 43 | Jan Glastra van Loon | 384 | |
| 44 | Thierry van Vugt | 349 | |
| 45 | Corine van Dun | 931 | |
| 46 | Stefan Wirken | 252 | |
| 47 | Nelleke de Smoker-van Andel | 985 | |
| 48 | Carmen Hoogeveen | 2,401 | |
| 49 | Bert Terlouw | 1,749 | |
| 50 | Dick Ross | 1,310 | |

== 7: Christian Union ==
Candidate list for the Christian Union
| Number | Candidate | Votes | Result |
|---|---|---|---|
| 1 | Gert-Jan Segers | 260,999 | Elected |
| 2 | Carola Schouten | 33,192 | Elected |
| 3 | Joël Voordewind | 6,166 | Elected |
| 4 | Carla Dik-Faber | 6,508 | Elected |
| 5 | Eppo Bruins | 1,643 | Elected |
| 6 | Stieneke van der Graaf | 11,526 | Replacement |
| 7 | Don Ceder | 8,276 | |
| 8 | Hermen Vreugdenhil | 1,083 | |
| 9 | Nico Drost | 670 | Replacement |
| 10 | Joëlle Gooijer-Medema | 3,169 | |
| 11 | Gerben Huisman | 1,657 | |
| 12 | Gerdien Rots | 2,306 | |
| 13 | Bert Tijhof | 1,349 | |
| 14 | Pieter Grinwis | 269 | |
| 15 | Harmke Vlieg-Kempe | 1,110 | |
| 16 | Leon Meijer | 468 | |
| 17 | Jannes Janssen | 503 | |
| 18 | Marijke Heuvelink | 722 | |
| 19 | Sander van ’t Foort | 210 | |
| 20 | Willemien Treurniet-Klapwijk | 925 | |
| 21 | Gerard Mostert | 495 | |
| 22 | Simone Kennedy-Doornbos | 748 | |
| 23 | Esam Ebid | 1,164 | |
| 24 | Harold Hofstra | 231 | |
| 25 | Anil Kumar | 170 | |
| 26 | Jet Weigand-Timmer | 253 | |
| 27 | Ben Visser | 217 | |
| 28 | Esther Kaper-Hartenberg | 351 | |
| 29 | Theo Krins | 225 | |
| 30 | Heimen Schuring | 252 | |
| 31 | Ankie van Tatenhove-Meesen | 253 | |
| 32 | Janny Joosten-Leijendekker | 376 | |
| 33 | Loes Zuidervaart | 441 | |
| 34 | Bart Jaspers Faijer | 248 | |
| 35 | Inge Jongman-Mollema | 432 | |
| 36 | Jesse de Haan | 594 | |
| 37 | Dico Baars | 341 | |
| 38 | Frank Visser | 251 | |
| 39 | Annacarina Klein | 172 | |
| 40 | Farshid Seyed Mehdi | 275 | |
| 41 | Els Kooij-Bas | 190 | |
| 42 | Kees van Kranenburg | 83 | |
| 43 | Gert van den Berg | 218 | |
| 44 | Ixora Balootje | 324 | |
| 45 | Frans van Zaalen | 145 | |
| 46 | Anja Haga | 568 | |
| 47 | Ron van der Spoel | 477 | |
| 48 | Henk Stoorvogel | 1,490 | |
| 49 | Arie van der Veer | 723 | |
| 50 | Orlando Bottenbley | 1,813 | |

== 8: GroenLinks ==
Candidate list for the GroenLinks
| Number | Candidate | Votes | Result |
|---|---|---|---|
| 1 | Jesse Klaver | 651,483 | Elected |
| 2 | Kathalijne Buitenweg | 99,157 | Elected |
| 3 | Tom van der Lee | 2,679 | Elected |
| 4 | Linda Voortman | 21,098 | Elected |
| 5 | Rik Grashoff | 3,094 | Elected |
| 6 | Liesbeth van Tongeren | 25,856 | Elected |
| 7 | Corinne de Jonge van Ellemeet | 6,626 | Elected |
| 8 | Zihni Özdil | 5,747 | Elected |
| 9 | Bart Snels | 852 | Elected |
| 10 | Bram van Ojik | 6,759 | Elected |
| 11 | Suzanne Kröger | 8,086 | Elected |
| 12 | Nevin Özütok | 12,428 | Elected |
| 13 | Paul Smeulders | 3,328 | Replacement |
| 14 | Lisa Westerveld | 17,828 | Elected |
| 15 | Laura Bromet | 8,686 | Replacement |
| 16 | Wim-Jan Renkema | 1,348 | Replacement |
| 17 | Huib van Essen | 861 | |
| 18 | Niels van den Berge | 997 | Replacement |
| 19 | Isabelle Diks | 28,390 | Elected |
| 20 | Tom van den Nieuwenhuijzen | 1,413 | Replacement |
| 21 | Ilias Mahtab | 3,237 | |
| 22 | Cathelijne Bouwkamp | 9,963 | |
| 23 | Dirk van den Bosch | 388 | |
| 24 | Maya van der Steenhoven | 3,200 | |
| 25 | Arno Bonte | 1,573 | |
| 26 | Marion van der Kleij | 2,889 | |
| 27 | Hans Kuipers | 420 | |
| 28 | Jonne Arnoldussen | 311 | |
| 29 | Janet Duursma | 2,669 | |
| 30 | Armağan Önder | 6,012 | |
| 31 | Volkert Vintges | 307 | |
| 32 | Samir Bashara | 700 | |
| 33 | Huub Bellemakers | 637 | |
| 34 | Cora Smelik | 1,513 | |
| 35 | Sophie Schers | 5,193 | |
| 36 | Michel Klijmij-van der Laan | 362 | |
| 37 | Rocco Piers | 137 | |
| 38 | Paul Vermast | 182 | |
| 39 | Marjoleine Snaas | 576 | |
| 40 | Kevin van Oort | 328 | |
| 41 | Daniëlle Hirsch | 865 | |
| 42 | Gerdo van Grootheest | 984 | |
| 43 | Lot van Hooijdonk | 898 | |
| 44 | Frans Kapteijns | 451 | |
| 45 | Lenie Scholten | 727 | |
| 46 | Alphonse Muambi | 652 | |
| 47 | Nienke Homan-Brinkman | 3,378 | |
| 48 | Arjan El Fassed | 287 | |
| 49 | Bas Rüter | 177 | |
| 50 | Ineke van Gent | 3,868 | |

== 9: Reformed Political Party ==
| Number | Candidate | Votes | Result |
|---|---|---|---|
| 1 | Kees van der Staaij | 196,205 | Elected |
| 2 | Elbert Dijkgraaf | 13,573 | Elected |
| 3 | Roelof Bisschop | 1,570 | Elected |
| 4 | Bert-Jan Ruissen | 737 | |
| 5 | Chris Stoffer | 926 | Replacement |
| 6 | Geert Schipaanboord | 390 | |
| 7 | Jan Kloosterman | 404 | |
| 8 | Hans Tanis | 239 | |
| 9 | Joost Veldman | 259 | |
| 10 | Evert Jan Nieuwenhuis | 210 | |
| 11 | Arnold Weggeman | 172 | |
| 12 | Peter Hoek | 152 | |
| 13 | Leendert de Knegt | 355 | |
| 14 | André Flach | 164 | |
| 15 | Wim van Wikselaar | 109 | |
| 16 | Gert van Leeuwen | 183 | |
| 17 | Ewart Bosma | 461 | |
| 18 | Wim Kok | 205 | |
| 19 | Tom Bakker | 188 | |
| 20 | Gerrit Boonzaaijer | 139 | |
| 21 | Sjaak Simonse | 216 | |
| 22 | Wim van Duijn | 423 | |
| 23 | Steven van Westreenen | 118 | |
| 24 | Hans van 't Land | 379 | |
| 25 | Peter Noordergraaf | 131 | |
| 26 | Jan Willem Benschop | 86 | |
| 27 | Ad Dorst | 126 | |
| 28 | Wouter van den Berg | 138 | |
| 29 | Wim de Vries | 100 | |
| 30 | Mark Brouwer | 592 | |

== 10: Party for the Animals ==
Candidate list for the Party for the Animals
| Number | Candidate | Votes | Result |
|---|---|---|---|
| 1 | Marianne Thieme | 261,658 | Elected |
| 2 | Esther Ouwehand | 18,936 | Elected |
| 3 | Lammert van Raan | 2,529 | Elected |
| 4 | Frank Wassenberg | 2,773 | Elected |
| 5 | Femke Merel Arissen | 6,131 | Elected |
| 6 | Eva van Esch | 5,785 | |
| 7 | Christine Teunissen | 4,458 | Replacement |
| 8 | Floriske van Leeuwen | 1,559 | |
| 9 | Niko Koffeman | 487 | |
| 10 | Ewald Engelen | 4,293 | |
| 11 | Johnas van Lammeren | 381 | |
| 12 | Eva Akerboom | 2,586 | Replacement |
| 13 | Bram van Liere | 656 | |
| 14 | Stephanie van Voorthuizen | 1,261 | |
| 15 | Marco van der Wel | 340 | |
| 16 | Luuk van der Veer | 511 | |
| 17 | Carla van Viegen | 675 | |
| 18 | Hiltje Keller | 287 | |
| 19 | Michelle van Doorn | 1,255 | |
| 20 | Pascale Plusquin | 994 | |
| 21 | Ruud van der Velden | 988 | |
| 22 | Ilse Smit | 687 | |
| 23 | Leonie Vestering | 591 | |
| 24 | Anjo Travaille | 204 | |
| 25 | Kirsten de Wrede | 2,276 | |
| 26 | Rinie van der Zanden | 382 | |
| 27 | Trees Janssens | 566 | |
| 28 | Ines Kostić | 1,377 | |
| 29 | Anja Hazekamp | 447 | |
| 30 | Frank Berendse | 218 | |
| 31 | Maarten Biesheuvel | 450 | |
| 32 | Jan-Peter Cruiming | 72 | |
| 33 | Bibi Dumon Tak | 381 | |
| 34 | Volkert Engelsman | 105 | |
| 35 | Johan de Haas | 400 | |
| 36 | Adri van der Heijden | 280 | |
| 37 | Malou Herstel | 243 | |
| 38 | Mensje van der Steen | 188 | |
| 39 | Eva Meijer | 273 | |
| 40 | Charlotte Mutsaers | 314 | |
| 41 | Peter Nicolaï | 88 | |
| 42 | Annemarie Postma | 534 | |
| 43 | Jan Rot | 274 | |
| 44 | Mirjam Rotenstreich | 133 | |
| 45 | Teske de Schepper | 607 | |
| 46 | Annemiek Schrijver | 272 | |
| 47 | Jan Siebelink | 165 | |
| 48 | Babette van Veen | 793 | |
| 49 | Georgina Verbaan | 2,848 | |
| 50 | Dinand Woesthoff | 1,503 | |

== 11: 50PLUS ==
Candidate list for 50PLUS
| Number | Candidate | Votes | Result |
|---|---|---|---|
| 1 | Henk Krol | 233,179 | Elected |
| 2 | Léonie Sazias | 51,736 | Elected |
| 3 | Martin van Rooijen | 9,096 | Elected |
| 4 | Corrie van Brenk | 5,091 | Elected |
| 5 | Gerrit Jan van Otterloo | 1,143 | Replacement |
| 6 | Simon Geleijnse | 767 | Replacement |
| 7 | Emile Bode | 1,663 | |
| 8 | Wilma Schrover | 2,556 | |
| 9 | Maurice Koopman | 620 | |
| 10 | Rob de Brouwer | 782 | |
| 11 | Theun Wiersma | 1,927 | |
| 12 | Presley Bergen | 543 | |
| 13 | Petra van Veeren | 1,535 | |
| 14 | Willem Willemse | 824 | |
| 15 | Jan Fonhof | 1,616 | |
| 16 | Natascha Kroonstuiver | 2,033 | |
| 17 | Henk Jan Verboom | 340 | |
| 18 | Monique van de Griendt | 379 | |
| 19 | Wim van Overveld | 306 | |
| 20 | Klaas Hamersma | 814 | |
| 21 | Harry Siepel | 513 | |
| 22 | Fred Kerkhof | 487 | |
| 23 | Adriana Hernández Martínez | 379 | |
| 24 | Wout Jansen | 357 | |
| 25 | Theo Heere | 106 | |
| 26 | Jaap Haasnoot | 212 | |
| 27 | Joop van Orsouw | 269 | |
| 28 | Rosa Molenaar | 362 | |
| 29 | Arno Haije | 205 | |
| 30 | Chris Spooren | 150 | |
| 31 | Olga de Meij | 285 | |
| 32 | André van Wanrooij | 70 | |
| 33 | Jan Frans Brouwers | 94 | |
| 34 | Jolanda van Hulst | 289 | |
| 35 | Rhianna Gralike | 180 | |
| 36 | Frans Bergwerf | 191 | |
| 37-50 | Regional candidates | | |

=== Regional candidates ===
Regional candidates for 50PLUS
| Candidate | Votes | Result | Position | | | | | | | | |
| Candidate | Votes | Result | Groningen | Leeuwarden, Assen | Zwolle | Lelystad | Nijmegen, Arnhem | Utrecht | Amsterdam, Haarlem, Den Helder | Den Haag, Rotterdam, Leiden, Dordrecht, Bonaire | Middelburg, Tilburg, Den Bosch, Maastricht |
|---|---|---|---|---|---|---|---|---|---|---|---|
| Barend Bergh | 27 | | | | | 38 | | | 38 | | |
| Mieke van Bree | 262 | | | | | | | | | | 39 |
| Hylke ten Cate | 244 | | 43 | 44 | 43 | 44 | 44 | 44 | 44 | 43 | 44 |
| Hans Gertsen | 111 | | 40 | 41 | 40 | 41 | 41 | 41 | 41 | 40 | 41 |
| Rob Goedhart | 126 | | 37 | 37 | | | | | | | |
| Marianne Hilte | 225 | | | | | | 37 | 38 | | 38 | |
| Mieke Hoek | 334 | | 48 | 49 | 48 | 49 | 49 | 49 | 49 | 48 | 49 |
| Harry Lamberts | 225 | | 45 | 46 | 45 | 46 | 46 | 46 | 46 | 45 | 46 |
| George Lernout | 244 | | | | | | | | | | 37 |
| Hein Meijer | 1,736 | | 41 | 42 | 41 | 42 | 42 | 42 | 42 | 41 | 42 |
| Guus Oesterreicher | 51 | | | | 38 | | | | 39 | | |
| Henri Pastoor | 132 | | | | | 37 | 38 | 39 | | | |
| Frans Rose | 78 | | 44 | 45 | 44 | 45 | 45 | 45 | 45 | 44 | 45 |
| Andreas van der Schaaf | 38 | | | | | | | 37 | 37 | 37 | |
| John Struijlaard | 1,119 | | 49 | 50 | 49 | 50 | 50 | 50 | 50 | 49 | 50 |
| Joep Taks | 212 | | | | | | | | | | 38 |
| Willem Terpstra | 139 | | | 39 | 37 | | | | | | |
| Chris Veeze | 213 | | 38 | 38 | | | | | | | |
| Walter Verhoeven | 73 | | | | | 39 | 39 | | | | |
| Auke de Vries | 65 | | 46 | 47 | 46 | 47 | 47 | 47 | 47 | 46 | 47 |
| Dick de Vries | 106 | | 39 | 40 | 39 | 40 | 40 | 40 | 40 | 39 | 40 |
| Henry van de Wal | 119 | | 47 | 48 | 47 | 48 | 48 | 48 | 48 | 47 | 48 |
| Dick van Zanten | 153 | | 42 | 43 | 42 | 43 | 43 | 43 | 43 | 42 | 43 |

== 12: Entrepreneurs Party ==
Candidate list for the Entrepreneurs Party
| Number | Candidate | Votes | Result |
|---|---|---|---|
| 1 | Hero Brinkman | 8,603 | |
| 2 | Martine Gaasbeek | 1,810 | |
| 3 | Jos de Vries | 222 | |
| 4 | Patrick Kicken | 461 | |
| 5 | Jos van den Berg | 180 | |
| 6 | Mariëtta de Koning | 276 | |
| 7 | Stavros Theocharis | 161 | |
| 8 | Sophie Andriol | 376 | |
| 9 | René Bol | 151 | |
| 10 | Harry Reitsma | 130 | |
| 11 | Denis Wood | 200 | |

== 13: VoorNederland ==
Candidate list for the VoorNederland
| Number | Candidate | Votes | Result |
|---|---|---|---|
| 1 | Jan Roos | 30,241 | |
| 2 | Joram van Klaveren | 2,016 | |
| 3 | Louis Bontes | 1,035 | |
| 4 | Tanya Hoogwerf | 2,185 | |
| 5 | Alexander Sassen | 166 | |
| 6 | Michel Versteeg | 136 | |
| 7 | Jan de Laat | 90 | |
| 8 | Symen van der Meer | 121 | |
| 9 | Peter Vermaas | 286 | |
| 10 | Jeffrey Himpers | 93 | |
| 11 | René van Gemert | 319 | |
| 12 | Johan Oosterhagen | 86 | |
| 13 | Johan Molema | 156 | |
| 14 | Arjan de Gast | 96 | |
| 15 | Sachin Chandarsing | 112 | |
| 16 | Ronald van Tiggelen | 70 | |
| 17 | Chris de Veth | 55 | |
| 18 | Laurence Stassen | 946 | |

== 14: DENK ==
Candidate list for the Denk
| Number | Candidate | Votes | Result |
|---|---|---|---|
| 1 | Tunahan Kuzu | 129,025 | Elected |
| 2 | Farid Azarkan | 61,876 | Elected |
| 3 | Selçuk Öztürk | 10,367 | Elected |
| 4 | Gladys Albitrouw | 1,193 | |
| 5 | Stephan van Baarle | 408 | |
| 6 | Magdalena Charlot | 303 | |
| 7 | Mourad Taimounti | 3,186 | |
| 8 | Ayşegül Kiliç | 3,486 | |
| 9 | Marisa Koolbergen | 219 | |
| 10 | Ali Tsouli | 633 | |
| 11 | Marit van Splunter | 231 | |
| 12 | Şerif Uysal | 352 | |
| 13 | Rabia Karaman | 1,644 | |
| 14 | Talhat Raja | 1,035 | |
| 15 | Yunus Kayiş | 573 | |
| 16 | Zaheer Rana | 513 | |
| 17 | Nevzat Demirel | 683 | |
| 18 | Keziban Ince | 420 | |

== 15: Nieuwe Wegen ==
Candidate list for the Nieuwe Wegen
| Position | Candidate | Votes | Result |
|---|---|---|---|
| 1 | Alfred Oosenbrug | 4,584 | |
| 2 | Jacques Monasch | 5,277 | |
| 3 | Ramona Beemsterboer | 1,117 | |
| 4 | Iprahim Ekiz | 157 | |
| 5 | Ton Spitsbaard | 111 | |
| 9 | Inge Jochems | 379 | |
| 11 | Romeo Durgaram | 85 | |
| 26 | Jorik Visscher | 51 | |
| 27 | Jana Hurtado-Panek | 57 | |
| 28 | Wim van der Maas | 99 | |
| 29 | Simone de Boer | 171 | |
| 30 | Leo Buchel | 80 | |
| Total | | | |

== 16: Forum for Democracy ==
Candidate list for the Forum for Democracy
| Number | Candidate | Votes | Result |
|---|---|---|---|
| 1 | Thierry Baudet | 124,991 | Elected |
| 2 | Theo Hiddema | 44,934 | Elected |
| 3 | Susan Teunissen | 8,505 | Declined |
| 4 | Henk Otten | 463 | Declined |
| 5 | Paul Frentrop | 259 | |
| 6 | Rob Rooken | 200 | |
| 7 | Susan Stolze-van Rijn | 1,929 | |
| 8 | Gert Reedijk | 690 | |
| 9 | Yernaz Ramautarsing | 424 | |
| 10 | Zlata Brouwer | 244 | |
| 11 | Jeroen de Vries | 143 | |
| 12 | Arthur Legger | 46 | |
| 13 | Carola Dieudonné | 658 | |
| 14 | Godert van Assen | 91 | |
| 15 | Geert Jeelof | 183 | |
| 16 | Luke Boltjes | 486 | |
| 17 | Freek Jan Berkhout | 83 | |
| 18 | Sander Boon | 78 | |
| 19 | Arjan de Kok | 121 | |
| 20 | Astrid de Groot | 258 | |
| 21 | Hugo Berkhout | 67 | |
| 22 | Roel Mooijekind | 181 | |
| 23 | Kees Eldering | 125 | |
| 24 | Erik Verbrugh | 84 | |
| 25 | Saskia Koning | 299 | |
| 26 | Hemmie Kerklingh | 38 | |
| 27 | Hendrikus Velzing | 381 | |
| 28 | Loek van Wely | 412 | |
| 29 | Frank Ankersmit | 162 | |
| 30 | Paul Cliteur | 627 | |

== 17: De Burger Beweging ==
Candidate list for De Burger Beweging
| Number | Candidate | Votes | Result |
|---|---|---|---|
| 1 | Ad Vlems | 2,159 | |
| 2 | Albert de Louw | 348 | |
| 3 | André Rozendaal | 168 | |
| 4 | Anita van der Linde | 475 | |
| 5 | Anke Siegers | 169 | |
| 6 | Annette Mul | 157 | |
| 7 | Anthony Migchels | 48 | |
| 8 | Augusto Titarsole | 126 | |
| 9 | Dirk Dubling | 150 | |
| 10 | Elovena Ackerman | 24 | |
| 11 | Erik Holthuis | 48 | |
| 12 | Frieda Bos | 87 | |
| 13 | Geert Vousten | 28 | |
| 14 | Gio Vogelaar | 76 | |
| 15 | Hanneke Bijl | 41 | |
| 16 | Hans van Steenbergen | 59 | |
| 17 | Hugo Schönbeck | 45 | |
| 18 | Indi Hondema | 62 | |
| 19 | Janita Venema | 81 | |
| 20 | Jeroen Ghuijs | 42 | |
| 21 | Jolanda Kirpensteijn | 45 | |
| 22 | Jolanda Wilshaus | 21 | |
| 23 | Karina Jansen | 50 | |
| 24 | Kitty Haccou | 85 | |
| 25 | Leo van der Vlist | 9 | |
| 26 | Lex Hupe | 22 | |
| 27 | Louis Bervoets | 71 | |
| 28 | Marco Janssen | 21 | |
| 29 | Marielle Cornielje | 70 | |
| 30 | Marnix Lamers | 28 | |
| 31 | Marijke Hanff | 26 | |
| 32 | Nina van der Burgt | 49 | |
| 33 | Peter van Vliet | 14 | |
| 34 | Purusha van de Graaf | 21 | |
| 35 | Rene Visser | 45 | |
| 36 | René Graafsma | 14 | |
| 37 | Robbert Geelen | 12 | |
| 38 | Robert Swami-Persaud | 19 | |
| 39 | Roula Tourgaidis | 38 | |
| 40 | Sjoerd Zoethout | 45 | |
| 41 | Wernard Bruining | 54 | |
| 42 | Wim Massop | 69 | |

== 18: Vrijzinnige Partij ==
Candidate list for the Vrijzinnige Partij
| Number | Candidate | Votes | Result |
|---|---|---|---|
| 1 | Norbert Klein | 1,819 | |
| 2 | Marie-Louise Loomans | 475 | |
| 3 | Maarten Wienbelt | 59 | |
| 4 | Artemis Westenberg | 147 | |
| 5 | Harry Haddering | 82 | |
| 6 | Wouter Smit | 49 | |
| 7 | Ruud Lammers | 29 | |
| 8 | Gerard Kuijpers | 32 | |
| 9 | Yohan Byrde | 19 | |
| 10 | Antoon Huigens | 30 | |
| 11 | Dino Seelig | 46 | |
| 12 | Martin Vorswijk | 54 | |
| 13 | Jeroen Zandberg | 28 | |
| 14 | Lucas Stassen | 69 | |

== 19: GeenPeil ==
Candidate list for the GeenPeil
| Number | Candidate | Votes | Result |
|---|---|---|---|
| 1 | Jan Dijkgraaf | 3,474 | |
| 2 | Beryl Dreijer | 289 | |
| 3 | Ahmed Aarad | 161 | |
| 4 | Damiaan Reijnaers | 100 | |
| 5 | Chantal Klaver | 231 | |
| 6 | Alptekin Akdoğan | 146 | |
| 7 | Niels de Swart | 32 | |
| 8 | Geert-Johan Riemer | 61 | |
| 9 | Vivienne Groenewoud | 89 | |
| 10 | Sander Giebels | 68 | |
| 11 | Ali Bal | 40 | |
| 12 | Maarten Brante | 30 | |
| 13 | Marcel de Dood | 145 | |
| 14 | Stefan de Konink | 79 | |

== 20: Pirate Party ==
Candidate list for the Pirate Party
| Number | Candidate | Votes | Result |
|---|---|---|---|
| 1 | Ancilla van de Leest | 30,114 | |
| 2 | Matthijs Pontier | 1,279 | |
| 3 | Rico Brouwer | 390 | |
| 4 | Alex Straver | 190 | |
| 5 | Petra Downs-Hovestadt | 532 | |
| 6 | Tjerk Feitsma | 80 | |
| 7 | Maarten Lensink | 81 | |
| 8 | Lars Janssen | 72 | |
| 9 | Bob Sikkema | 89 | |
| 10 | Michiel Dulfer | 222 | |
| 11 | Rogier Huurman | 95 | |
| 12 | Bas Dieleman | 226 | |
| 13 | Gijs Peskens | 81 | |
| 14 | Wiel Maessen | 53 | |
| 15 | Dylan Hallegraeff | 126 | |
| 16 | Joran de Jong | 54 | |
| 17 | Janmaarten Batstra | 107 | |
| 18 | Vincent van der Velde | 80 | |
| 19 | Frank Wijnans | 52 | |
| 20 | Leo van Oudheusden | 121 | |
| 21 | Gertjan Kleinpaste | 67 | |
| 22 | Melvin Stubbe | 70 | |
| 23 | Dave Borghuis ook genaamd op de Borg | 168 | |
| 24 | Ronald Schönberger | 46 | |
| 25 | Erik van Luxzenburg | 67 | |
| 26 | Uzi Bouyaara | 60 | |
| 27 | Wim van den Dool | 41 | |
| 28 | Ewoud Hofman | 89 | |
| 29 | Jelle Dirk Pasterkamp | 27 | |
| 30 | Martin van Vuuren | 37 | |
| 31 | Arne Biesma | 19 | |
| 32 | Teun Gautier | 19 | |
| 33 | Loulou van Ravensteijn | 113 | |
| 34 | Floor Ziegler | 136 | |
| 35 | Tommy Ventevogel | 51 | |
| 36 | Khalid Ahmed Chaudry | 90 | |
| 37 | Dirk Poot | 334 | |

== 21: Artikel 1 ==
Candidate list for Artikel 1
| Number | Candidate | Votes | Result |
|---|---|---|---|
| 1 | Sylvana Simons | 26,095 | |
| 2 | Fatima Faïd | 364 | |
| 3 | Brigitte Sins | 91 | |
| 4 | Adil Akhechaa | 57 | |
| 5 | Jens van Tricht | 44 | |
| 6 | Ian van der Kooye | 70 | |
| 7 | Phyllis Döll-Osei Ameyaw | 378 | |
| 8 | Simone van Saarloos | 129 | |
| 9 | Olave Basabose | 218 | |
| 10 | Martijn Dekker | 18 | |
| 11 | Juanita Hernández González | 56 | |
| 12 | Robert Witte | 37 | |
| 13 | Gert-Jan van de Vaate | 25 | |
| 14 | Marianella Leito | 103 | |
| 15 | Jasper van der Veen | 10 | |
| 16 | Annemieke Bakker | 22 | |
| 17 | Anne-Ruth Wertheim | 26 | |
| 18 | Glenn Helberg | 362 | |
| 19 | Gloria Wekker | 450 | |
| 20 | Anja Meulenbelt | 145 | |

== 22: Niet Stemmers ==
Candidate list for Niet Stemmers
| Number | Candidate | Votes | Result |
|---|---|---|---|
| 1 | Peter Plasman | 4,385 | |
| 2 | Rijk Plasman | 116 | |
| 3 | Rits Plasman | 68 | |
| 4 | Willem van Vliet | 79 | |
| 5 | Nihad El Farougui | 210 | |
| 6 | Remco Rhee | 126 | |
| 7 | Maribel Schwab | 124 | |
| 8 | Yasemin Karga | 87 | |
| 9 | Selmi Konya | 67 | |
| 10 | Rachel Held | 280 | |
| 11 | Carolien Pentinga | 114 | |
| 12 | Judith Plasman-van Ligten | 369 | |

== 23: Libertarian Party ==
Candidate list for the Libertarian Party
| Number | Candidate | Votes | Result |
|---|---|---|---|
| 1 | Robert Valentine | 900 | |
| 2 | Arno Inen | 48 | |
| 3 | Nathan Bouscher | 36 | |
| 4 | Simone Pailer | 107 | |
| 5 | Mathieu Hampton | 37 | |
| 6 | Quintus Backhuijs | 30 | |
| 7 | Imre Wessels | 18 | |
| 8 | Karel Knispel | 18 | |
| 9 | Klaas Wassenaar | 16 | |
| 10 | Juan van Ginkel | 15 | |
| 11 | Aike de Vries | 46 | |
| 12 | Nando Jansen | 26 | |
| 13 | Sjors Nagtegaal | 16 | |
| 14 | Marinus van der Wal | 19 | |
| 15 | Ewout Jansma | 31 | |
| 16 | Bertus Woudwijk | 21 | |
| 17 | Pallieter Koopmans | 12 | |
| 18 | Toine Manders | 96 | |

== 24: Lokaal in de Kamer ==
Candidate list for Lokaal in de Kamer
| Number | Candidate | Votes | Result |
|---|---|---|---|
| 1 | Jan Heijman | 3,585 | |
| 2 | Jan van der Starre | 266 | |
| 3 | Ralf Stultiens | 164 | |
| 4 | Jeff Leever | 123 | |
| 5 | Denise Kunst-van Suijlekom | 636 | |
| 6 | Rene Kraaijenbrink | 129 | |
| 7 | Willem Jan Mandersloot | 44 | |
| 8 | Wil van Pinxteren | 51 | |
| 9 | Nelly Nieuwenhuizen | 273 | |
| 10 | Yvonne de Heer-Seveke | 143 | |
| 11 | Joke van Ruitenbeek-Schonewille | 82 | |
| 12 | Farid El-Khassim | 199 | |
| 13 | Frank Smit | 66 | |
| 14 | Diana van der Kraats | 71 | |
| 15 | Rien van de Sande | 37 | |
| 16 | Davy Jansen | 40 | |
| 17 | Jan Kwekkeboom | 93 | |
| 18 | Ron Rosbak | 43 | |
| 19 | Ilankarajah Hudson Louis | 147 | |
| 20 | Ludo Bolders | 18 | |
| 21 | Ans van der Velde | 51 | |
| 22 | Henk Frieman | 67 | |
| 23 | Annette Valent-Groot | 63 | |
| 24 | Conny de Bree | 116 | |
| 25 | Ramon Barends | 122 | |
| 26 | Gijs Dirkmaat | 32 | |
| 27 | Casper Kloos | 197 | |

== 25: Jezus leeft ==
Candidate list for Jezus Leeft
| Number | Candidate | Votes | Result |
|---|---|---|---|
| 1 | Florens van der Spek | 2,611 | |
| 2 | B.M.C.M.E. Neyndorff | 84 | |
| 3 | B.C. Vlasman | 73 | |
| 4 | J.A.C. van Ooijen | 138 | |
| 5 | W. de Visser | 82 | |
| 6 | J. Winters | 111 | |

== 26: StemNL ==
Candidate list for StemNL
| Number | Candidate | Votes | Result |
|---|---|---|---|
| 1 | Mario van den Eijnde | 231 | |
| 2 | Daniel van den Eijnde | 26 | |
| 3 | Marcel Ficken | 18 | |
| 4 | Willie de Wit | 11 | |
| 5 | Werner Hessing | 12 | |
| 6 | Mark Fontein | 13 | |
| 7 | Joyce van Herp | 12 | |
| 8 | Kees Schalk | 17 | |
| 9 | Máry van Rijsingen | 15 | |
| 10 | Sami Aydi | 10 | |
| 11 | Maruschka Post | 21 | |
| 12 | Jolyon Goldschmitz | 6 | |
| 13 | Gracia Nabi | 23 | |
| 14 | Enzio Griekspoor | 12 | |
| 15 | Maria Acosta | 5 | |
| 16 | Arnoud Berghuis | 63 | |
| 17 | Jeane Dijkstra | 16 | |
| 18 | Duco van der Kooij | 1 | |
| 19 | Brigitte Bakker | 15 | |

== 27: Human and Spirit/Basic Income Party/Peace and Justice ==
Candidate list for Human and Spirit/Basic Income Party/Peace and Justice
| Number | Candidate | Votes | Result |
|---|---|---|---|
| 1 | Tara-Joëlle Fonk | 441 | |
| 2 | Sylvie Jacobs | 40 | |
| 3 | Yvonne Brinkerink | 32 | |
| 4 | Petra Busio | 43 | |
| 5 | Rob Vellekoop | 15 | |
| 6 | Jan Storms | 5 | |
| 7 | Ferdinand Zanda | 4 | |
| 8 | Ron Smit | 2 | |
| 9 | Reginald Diepenhorst | 14 | |
| 10 | Robert Verhoeven | 3 | |
| 11 | Reinette de Boer | 14 | |
| 12 | Pauline Streuper | 4 | |
| 13 | Thom van Welt | 2 | |
| 14 | Frans Hakkel | 6 | |
| 15 | Peter Vlug | 15 | |
| 16 | Marcel Korver | 3 | |
| 17 | Rob van der Zon | 11 | |
| 18 | Ingrid Schaefer | 4 | |
| 19 | Annemarie de Beer | 3 | |
| 20 | Ashwin Karis | 6 | |
| 21 | Amadon Teunissen | 2 | |
| 22 | Erik Hertroys | 0 | |
| 23 | Lars van Swieten | 1 | |
| 24 | Eric van Balkum | 1 | |
| 25 | Lysander Verschuur | 4 | |
| 26 | Erika Mauritz | 2 | |
| 27-32 | Regional candidates | | |

=== Regional candidates ===
Regional candidates for Human and Spirit/Basic Income Party/Peace and Justice
| Candidate | Votes | Result | Position | |
| Candidate | Votes | Result | Arnhem | Utrecht |
|---|---|---|---|---|
| Rick Klein | 1 | | 27 | |
| Bert Kroek | 0 | | 29 | |
| An Kuiper | 12 | | | 27 |
| Micha Kuiper | 3 | | 28 | 29 |
| Jan Kuiper | 27 | | 30 | 32 |
| Titia de Meijer | 4 | | | 30 |
| Herman Morren | 0 | | | 31 |
| Rascha Wisse | 2 | | | 28 |

== 28: Vrije Democratische Partij ==
Candidate list for the Vrije Democratische Partij
| Number | Candidate | Votes | Result |
|---|---|---|---|
| 1 | B. Gökalp | 177 | |

== See also ==
- List of members of the House of Representatives of the Netherlands, 2017–2021

== Source ==
- Kiesraad (21 March 2017). "Uitslag Tweede Kamerverkiezing 2017" (PDF) (in Dutch).
