= Maikel Boon =

Dutch politician (born 1982)

Member of the House of Representatives
- Incumbent
- Assumed office 6 December 2023

Member of the Provincial Council of North Brabant
- In office 2015–2023

Personal details
- Born: 11 May 1982 (age 44) The Hague, Netherlands
- Party: PVV
- Occupation: Politician

Military service
- Allegiance: Netherlands
- Branch/service: Royal Netherlands Army
- Years of service: 2003-2008
- Rank: Private
- Unit: JWF 44 Armored Infantry
- Battles/wars: Operation Enduring Freedom

Maikel Christiaan Hendrikus Boon (born 11 May 1982) is a Dutch politician representing the Party for Freedom (PVV). He has been a member of the Provincial Council of North Brabant since 2015 and was elected to the House of Representatives in 2023.

== Biography ==
=== Professional background ===
Boon was born in The Hague in 1982. He completed MAVO and HAVO education in Bergen op Zoom before joining the Royal Dutch Army. He served a tour of Afghanistan in 2006 as part of the 44 Armored Infantry in 2006 in Uruzgan Province. After leaving the army he worked as a prison guard.

=== Political career ===
Boon was elected to the Provincial Council of North Brabant on behalf of the PVV in 2015. During the 2023 Dutch general election he was elected as an MP in the House of Representatives, taking up 24th place on the PVV's list. He became the party's spokesperson for social integration.

In December 2024, an investigation by De Groene Amsterdammer revealed that Boon manages a network of at least six Facebook pages, on which he has been anonymously distributing racist images created using artificial intelligence since 2015. Shortly after the article was published, five of the six pages went offline.

==== House committees ====
- Committee for Kingdom Relations
- Committee for Justice and Security
- Committee for Social Affairs and Employment
- Contact group United States

== Electoral history ==
Electoral history of Maikel Boon
Year	Body	Party	Pos.	Votes	Result		Ref.
Year	Body	Party	Pos.	Votes	Party seats	Individual	Ref.
2017	House of Representatives	Party for Freedom	39	413	20	Lost	
2021	House of Representatives	Party for Freedom	33	642	17	Lost	
2023	House of Representatives	Party for Freedom	24	731	37	Won	
2025	House of Representatives	Party for Freedom	23	597	26	Won	
