= André Flach =

Dutch politician (born 1976)

Member of the House of Representatives
- Incumbent
- Assumed office 6 December 2023

Personal details
- Born: 23 April 1976 (age 49) Ridderkerk, Netherlands
- Party: Reformed Political Party

André Flach (born 23 April 1976) is a Dutch politician representing the Reformed Political Party who was elected to the House of Representatives in the 2023 Dutch general election.

From 2006 to 2010 Flach was a member of the city council of Hendrik-Ido-Ambacht; from 2010 to 2023 he was a councillor of this municipality. In 2017 Flach was at position 14 for the House of Representatives resulting in 164 votes. In 2021, Flach was at position 4 on the candidate list for the 2021 elections and obtained 1,834 votes, which was not enough to be elected.

Flach became a House member in November 2023. He attributed the Dutch housing shortage to increased demand because of migration and divorces. He argued that the government had been too reluctant to intervene in the latter, and he advocated for measures such as opening municipal relationship counseling offices. In August 2024, the National Political Index concluded that Flach was the second most diligent House member from installation in 2023 to July 2024.

== Electoral history ==
Electoral history of André Flach
| Year | Body | Party | Pos. | Votes | Result | | Ref. |
| Year | Body | Party | Pos. | Votes | Party seats | Individual | Ref. |
|---|---|---|---|---|---|---|---|
| 2017 | House of Representatives | Reformed Political Party | 14 | 164 | 3 | Lost | |
| 2021 | House of Representatives | Reformed Political Party | 4 | 1,834 | 3 | Lost | |
| 2023 | House of Representatives | Reformed Political Party | 3 | 3,030 | 3 | Won | |
| 2025 | House of Representatives | Reformed Political Party | 3 | 6,337 | 3 | Won | |

== Personal life ==
Flach completed VWO at the Guido de Brès school in Rotterdam. He is married and has four children.
