= Bente Becker =

Dutch politician (born 1985)

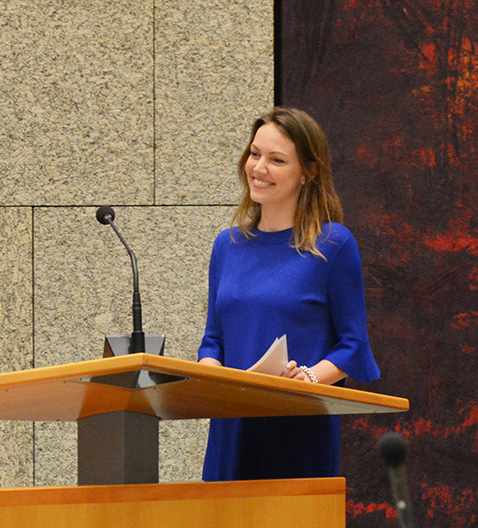
- Becker in 2018

Member of the House of Representatives
- Incumbent
- Assumed office 23 March 2017

Personal details
- Born: 12 August 1985 (age 41) Almere, Netherlands
- Party: VVD (since 2005)
- Children: 2
- Education: Tilburg University
- Occupation: Jurist • Politician

Bente Becker (born 12 August 1985) is a Dutch politician of the People's Party for Freedom and Democracy (VVD) who has served as a member of the House of Representatives since 2017.

== Political career ==
She has been a member of the House of Representatives since 2017. Following the 2023 general election, she served as vice-parliamentary leader of the VVD and as spokesperson for social integration, emancipation, and Dutch nationality law.

A motion by Becker was adopted in November 2024 urging the government "to monitor cultural and religious norms and values amongst inhabitants with a migration background". Some opposition parties fiercely criticized the proposal's language, with Labour Party leader Frans Timmermans arguing that it would violate the Constitution's principle of equality. Becker responded that her motion was intended to result in more fact-based debates on integration, while Prime Minister Dick Schoof clarified that the government would not track the beliefs of inhabitants with a migration background. Three parties later expressed regret over their earlier support for the motion following the controversy.

== Electoral history ==
Electoral history of Bente Becker
Year	Body	Party	Pos.	Votes	Result		Ref.
Year	Body	Party	Pos.	Votes	Party seats	Individual	Ref.
2017	House of Representatives	People's Party for Freedom and Democracy	14	4,288	33	Won	
2021	House of Representatives	People's Party for Freedom and Democracy	4	19,873	34	Won	
2023	House of Representatives	People's Party for Freedom and Democracy	3	14,597	24	Won	
2025	House of Representatives	People's Party for Freedom and Democracy	6	48,972	22	Won	
