= Henk de Vree =

Dutch politician (born 1954)

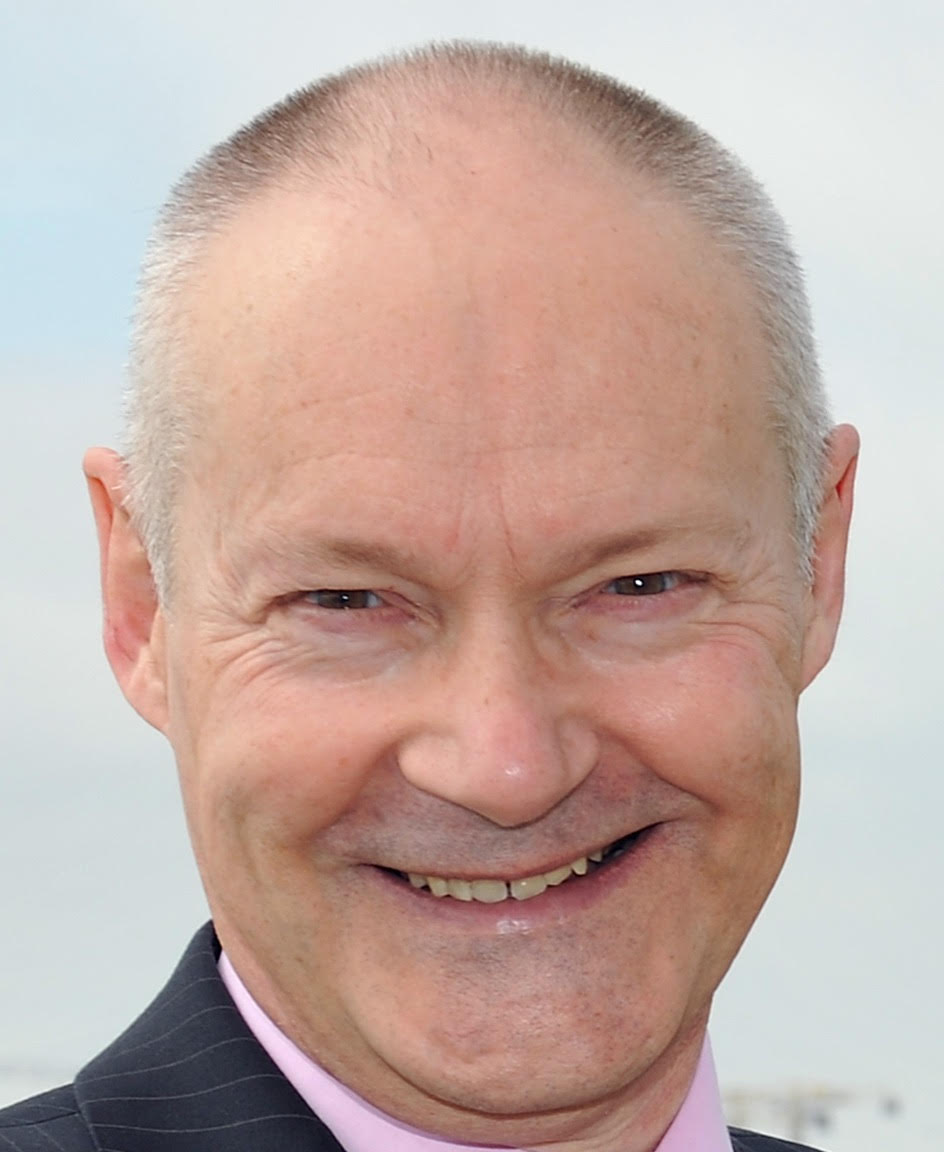

Member of the House of Representatives
- In office 6 December 2023 – 11 November 2025
- In office 8 December 2020 – 29 March 2021
- Preceded by: Vicky Maeijer
- Succeeded by: Vicky Maeijer

Member of the States of South Holland
- Incumbent
- Assumed office 17 March 2023

Member of the Hardinxveld-Giessendam municipal council
- In office 16 March 2006 – 27 January 2011
- Succeeded by: Henk van Tilborg

Personal details
- Born: J.H. de Vree; 29 January 1954 (age 72) Rotterdam, Netherlands
- Party: Party for Freedom
- Other political affiliations: Pim Fortuyn List (2002); Transparante Partij voor Algemeen Belang (2006–2011)
- Children: 1
- Education: Hogeschool voor Economische Studies
- Occupation: IT entrepreneur

J.H. "Henk" de Vree (born 29 January 1954) is a Dutch politician, who served on the House of Representatives in the periods 2020–2021 and 2023–2025. There, he represented the right-wing populist Party for Freedom (PVV).

He held a seat in the Hardinxveld-Giessendam municipal council between 2006 and 2011 as a member of a local party. Subsequently, he was elected to the States of South Holland, where he became the PVV's caucus leader.

== Education and career ==
Born in Rotterdam, De Vree grew up in the neighborhood Overschie. He graduated from high school with an atheneum diploma. He went on to study law at Erasmus University Rotterdam in 1972, but dropped out after two years and started working at dredging company Boskalis in administration and automation. Starting in 1988, he studied business and computing at the Rotterdam Hogeschool voor Economische Studies at heao level for four years, and he also had a job at Multi Data Technics as system designer and department head during that time.

He has been working as an IT entrepreneur since 1990. In the 2000s, he chaired a Papendrecht sports club and served as a board member of the local chapter Tussen Lek en Merwede of the social services association Humanitas next to his job.

== Politics ==
He joined the right-wing populist party Pim Fortuyn List (LPF) on 6 May 2002, the day Pim Fortuyn was assassinated, and became a board member of its South Holland chapter. He left the board later that year and joined the splinter party Democratisch Platform Nederland. De Vree also served as spokesperson for Actiecomité OZB Nee (Action committee property tax no), that was founded in 2004 after his municipality, Hardinxveld-Giessendam, had announced it would raise its property tax by 85%. As a result of the backlash, the municipal council lowered the increase to 55%.

He was elected to the Hardinxveld-Giessendam municipal council in March 2006 as a member of the new local party Transparante Partij voor Algemeen Belang (T@B; Transparent party for general interest). As councilor, De Vree wanted to cut government subsidies. He was re-elected in 2010, when his party received a plurality of council seats. He left the council in January 2011 to become a PVV politician, as the T@B did not want him to represent two parties in order to remain neutral.

=== States of South Holland and House of Representatives ===
He was elected to the States of South Holland in the March 2011 provincial election, being placed third on the PVV's party list. In the States Provincial, De Vree chaired the traffic and environment committee. He became PVV caucus leader in July 2014 when Vicky Maeijer left, and he was his party's lijsttrekker in South Holland during the 2015 election. During his second term, he criticized spending of taxpayer money by politicians, refusing to stay in a hotel during a get-together for States Provincial members and calling a €1,000 silver pin for King's Commissioner Jaap Smit too expensive.

He ran for member of parliament (MP) in the 2017 general election, appearing 24th on the PVV's party list. His party won 20 seats, and De Vree received 257 preferential votes – not sufficient for him to be elected. Shortly before the election, the slogans "Wilders racist", "PVV fascist", and "Henk de Vree, leave the PVV" were spray-painted on his home. The far-left group De Kwade Kwasten (The angry brushes) claimed responsibility. As PVV caucus leader in South Holland, he was responsible for selecting his party's candidates for the 2018 municipal elections in the province. The PVV participated in five municipalities compared to one during the previous elections. In the States of South Holland, he opposed plans to renovate the provincial parliament building for around €50 million and wanted to lower the road tax.

Again the PVV's lijsttrekker, De Vree was re-elected in the 2019 provincial elections, when the party lost half of its eight seats. During the campaign, he spoke out against measures to combat climate change. De Vree was appointed as temporary member of the House of Representatives in December 2020, when MP Vicky Maeijer went on maternity leave. He remained a member of the States Provincial. His temporary membership of the House ended after 29 March 2021, when Vicky Maeijer returned from her leave. De Vree was the PVV's 22nd candidate in the 2021 general election, which had been held two weeks earlier, but he was not elected due to the party winning seventeen seats. De Vree received 247 preferential votes. De Vree received a fourth term in the States of South Holland in March 2023, as he once more topped the party list. The PVV's seat count remained at four.

He ran for the House of Representatives in the November 2023 election, and he was elected. He served as the PVV's spokesperson for financial markets and government spending before his portfolio changed to the Euro and state-owned enterprises. De Vree was not re-elected in October 2025, and his term ended on 11 November.

=== House committee assignments ===
==== 2023–present term ====
- Committee for the Interior (chair)
- Committee for Digital Affairs
- Public Expenditure committee
- Committee for Finance

== Personal life ==
De Vree has a wife and a son, and he lived in the South Holland municipality Hardinxveld-Giessendam when he was an MP.

== Electoral history ==
Electoral history of Henk de Vree
Year	Body	Party	Pos.	Votes	Result		Ref.
Year	Body	Party	Pos.	Votes	Party seats	Individual	Ref.
2017	House of Representatives	Party for Freedom	24	257	20	Lost (Note: De Vree was appointed to the body later during the term due to a vacancy.)	
2021	House of Representatives	Party for Freedom	22	247	17	Lost	
2023	House of Representatives	Party for Freedom	18	425	37	Won	
2025	House of Representatives	Party for Freedom	30	232	26	Lost	
