= Wimar Bolhuis =

Dutch politician (born 1986)

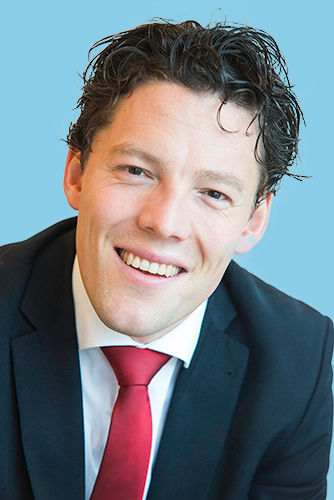
- Bolhuis in 2012

Member of the House of Representatives
- Incumbent
- Assumed office 10 June 2026
- Preceded by: Esmah Lahlah

Personal details
- Born: 1986 (age 39–40)
- Party: Labour Party (until 2026); PRO (since 2026)
- Other political affiliations: GroenLinks–PvdA

Wimar Bolhuis (born 1986) is a Dutch politician serving as a member of the House of Representatives since 2026. From 2025 to 2026, he served as director of the health and work unit of the Netherlands Organisation for Applied Scientific Research (TNO). From 2022 to 2025, he served as director of the TNO Vector unit of the TNO. From 2019 to 2025, he was a lecturer in economics at Leiden University. From 2021 to 2022, he served as chief economist of the Dutch branch of Ecorys.
