= Anne Kuik =

Dutch politician (born 1987)

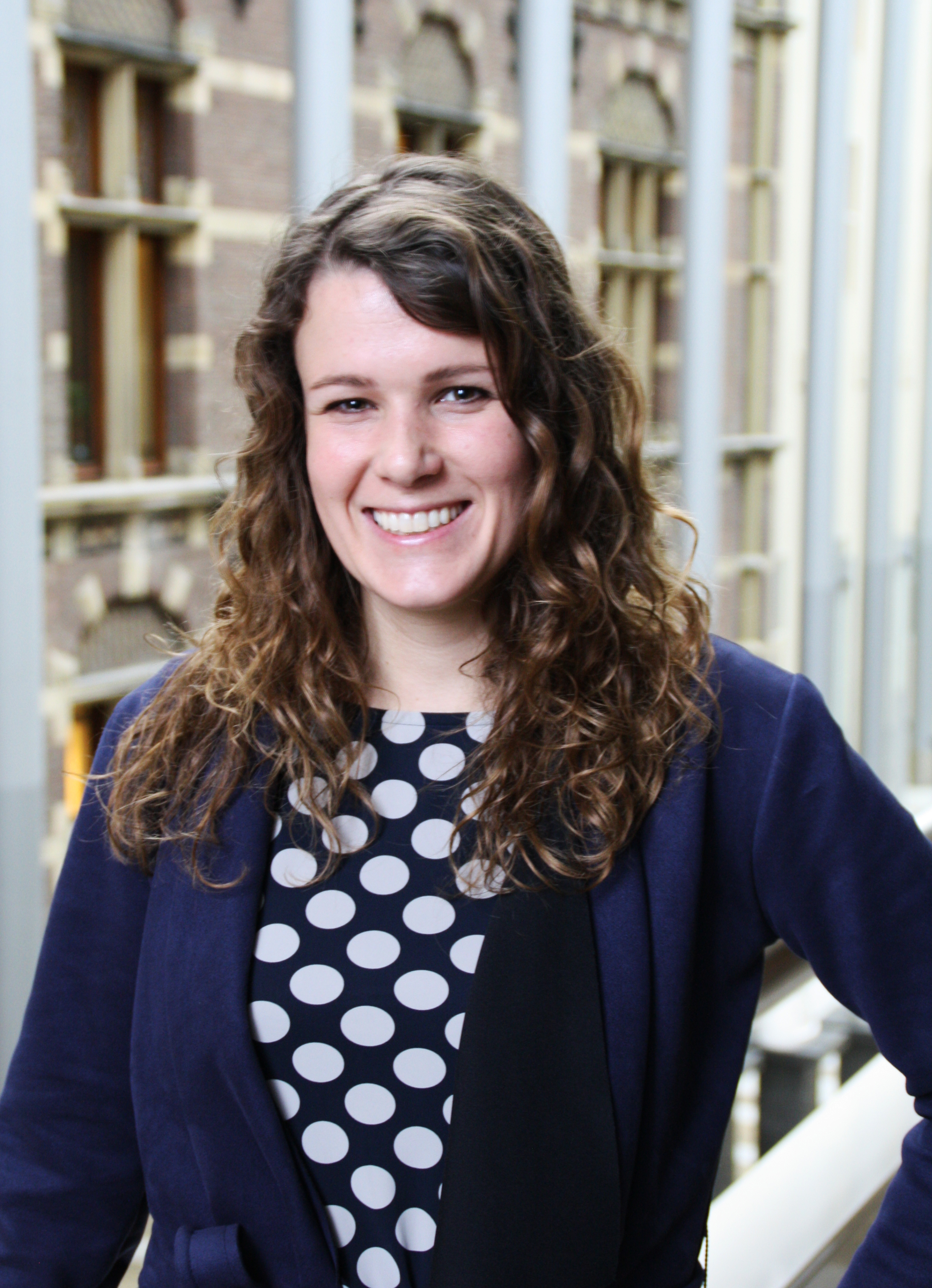
- Kuik in 2017

Member of the House of Representatives
- In office 23 March 2017 – 5 December 2023

Member of the municipal council of Groningen
- In office 2010–2017

Personal details
- Born: 22 January 1987 (age 39) Emmen, Netherlands
- Party: CDA
- Domestic partner: Paul de Rook (m. 2018)
- Education: University of Groningen (LLM)
- Occupation: Jurist; Politician

Anne Kuik (born 22 January 1987) is a Dutch former politician of the Christian Democratic Appeal (CDA). She was a member of the House of Representatives from March 2017 to December 2023.

== Early life and education ==
Kuik grew up in Nieuw-Amsterdam in the province of Drenthe. From 1999 to 2005, Kuik attended grammar school at the Hondsrug College in Emmen. From 2005 to 2013 she studied Dutch law at the University of Groningen. She graduated in civil law and constitutional and administrative law. During her studies she was a member of student association RKSV Albertus Magnus.

== Career ==
During her student years, Kuik was a staffer of the CDA group in the Groningen municipal council from 2007 to 2010. She joined the municipal council herself in 2010 and became group leader in 2012. She was the lead candidate for the 2014 municipal election.

As a councillor, she became known in 2014 for the election of "Best Councillor in the Netherlands" (Beste Raadslid van Nederland), where she finished second behind Heerlen councillor Ron Meyer of the Socialist Party. Kuik resigned from her leadership position in May 2014 when her boyfriend, Paul de Rook, became the alderman for traffic and culture in the municipal executive of Groningen for the Democrats 66 (D66). Between January 2015 and October 2016 she was also a presenter on NPO Radio 1 at the Evangelische Omroep of, among others, Dit is de Nacht.

For the House of Representatives election in March 2017, Kuik stood for the CDA in eleventh position on the candidate list and obtained 15,906 preferential votes. During that term, Kuik was spokesperson for development cooperation, secondary vocational education (MBO), prevention policy, prostitution policy and human trafficking. On 19 April 2017, Kuik gave her maiden speech during a debate about vaccinations and invasive exotic species, specifically the tiger mosquito.

In 2018, she was the first Dutch parliamentarian to sign the Barcelona Declaration, encouraging the fight against tuberculosis. Because of this signature, she was known as tering-ambassadeur (tering being a pejorative archaism of tuberculosis). As a spokesperson in the field of prostitution policy, Kuik advocated a ban on paid sex, following the Swedish model, in September 2020. To expose abuses in prostitution, Kuik also launched the podcast Vrouw te koop? ('Woman for sale?'). In the run-up to the parliamentary inquiry into natural gas extraction in Groningen, Kuik was part of the temporary committee that had to prepare this at the end of 2020.

At the House of Representatives election in March 2021, Kuik was third on the CDA candidate list. She received 32,945 preference votes, above the preference threshold. Her portfolio remained virtually the same, but focused on security and terrorism instead of secondary vocational education. After already having worked on the preparations, Kuik was part of the parliamentary inquiry committee for natural gas extraction in Groningen. In April 2021, she also became a member of the presidium of the House of Representatives. Kuik went on maternity leave on 3 May until 22 August 2022.

She lost her seat in 2023, but made a brief return to politics between May and September 2024 as an alderwoman in the municipal executive of Woudenberg, replacing another alderwoman during her maternity leave.

== Personal life ==
Kuik married former Groningen municipal councillor Paul de Rook of the Democrats 66 in July 2018. The civil wedding was performed by then D66 councillor Ton Schroor. The church wedding was performed by then CDA party chairman Ruth Peetoom. On 8 June 2022, De Rook and Kuik became parents of a daughter.

== Decorations ==
Honours
Ribbon bar	Honour	Country	Date	Comment
	Knight of the Order of Orange-Nassau	Netherlands	5 December 2023	

== Electoral history ==
Electoral history of Anne Kuik
Year	Body	Party	Pos.	Votes	Result		Ref.
Year	Body	Party	Pos.	Votes	Party seats	Individual	Ref.
2017	House of Representatives	Christian Democratic Appeal	11	15,906	19	Won	
2021	House of Representatives	Christian Democratic Appeal	3	32,945	15	Won	
2023	House of Representatives	Christian Democratic Appeal	10	1,980	5	Lost	
