= Roy van Aalst =

Dutch politician

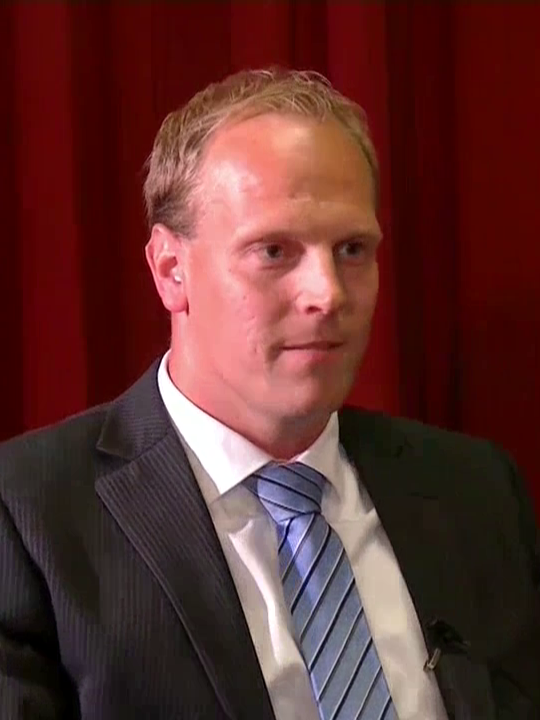
- Roy van Aalst in 2016

Member of the House of Representatives
- In office 23 March 2017 – 30 March 2021

Member of the States of Overijssel
- In office March 2015 – 22 May 2017

Personal details
- Born: R. R. van Aalst; 28 March 1983 (age 43) Enschede, Netherlands
- Party: Party for Freedom

R. R. "Roy" van Aalst (Dutch pronunciation: [ɛr ɛr ˈrɔi vɑn ˈaːlst]; born 28 March 1983) is a Dutch politician. He was a member of the House of Representatives representing the Party for Freedom between 23 March 2017 and 30 March 2021 and a member of the States of Overijssel between March 2015 and 2017. Van Aalst is married, has three children, and lives in Hengelo.

== Electoral history ==
Electoral history of Roy van Aalst
Year	Body	Party	Pos.	Votes	Result		Ref.
Year	Body	Party	Pos.	Votes	Party seats	Individual	Ref.
2017	House of Representatives	Party for Freedom	20	1,524	20	Won	
2021	House of Representatives	Party for Freedom	19	807	17	Lost	
2023	House of Representatives	Belang van Nederland	6	240	0	Lost	
2024	European Parliament	Belang van Nederland	2	550	0	Lost	
2025	House of Representatives	Belang van Nederland	50	63	0	Lost	
