= Kirsten van den Hul =

Dutch columnist and politician

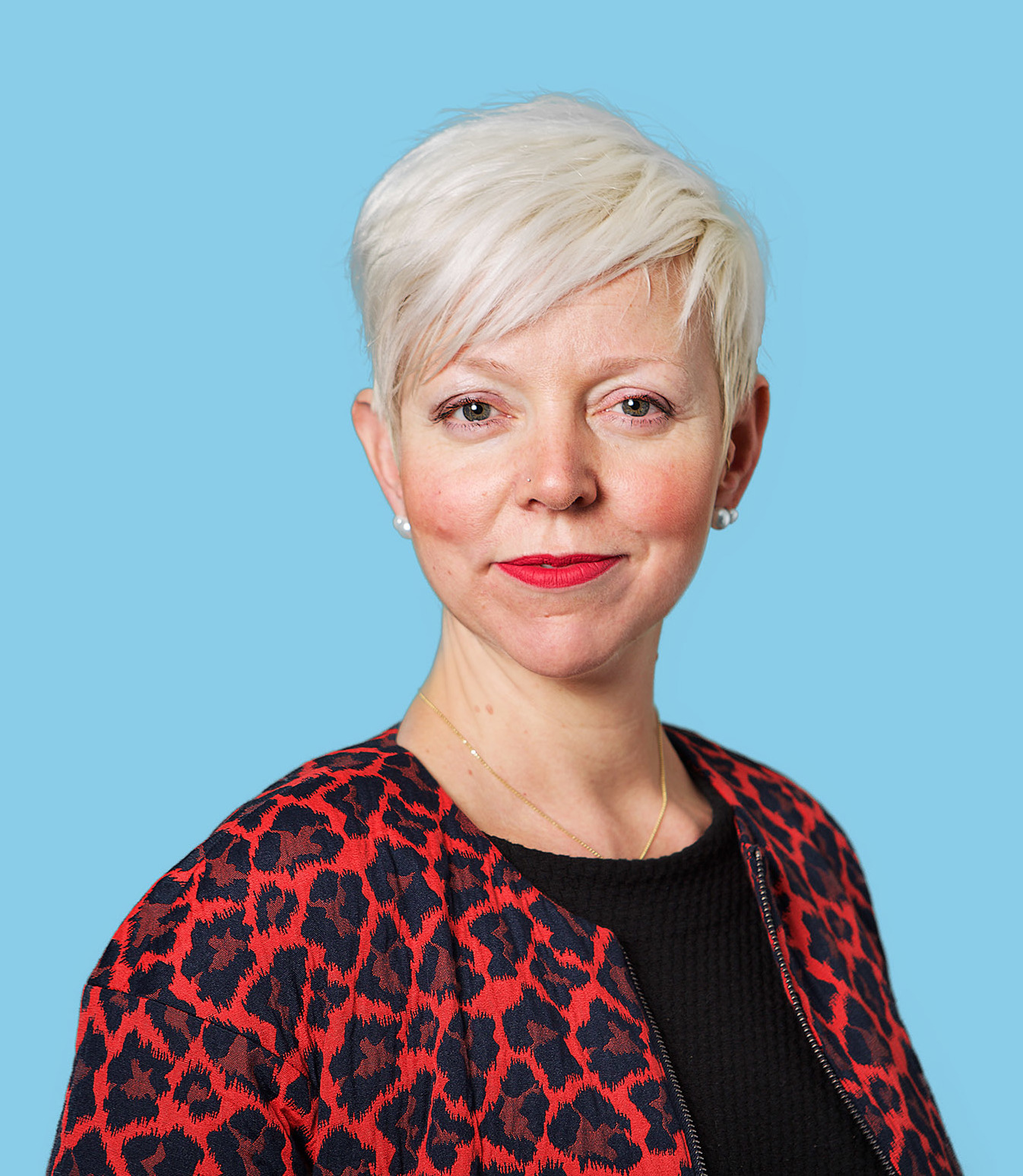
- Van den Hul in 2016

Member of the House of Representatives
- In office 23 March 2017 – 30 March 2021

Personal details
- Born: Kirsten Auke Elisabeth van den Hul; 18 August 1976 (age 49) Deventer, Netherlands
- Party: Labour Party
- Domestic partner: Ibrahim Deraz

Kirsten Auke Elisabeth van den Hul (Dutch pronunciation: [ˈkɪrstə(ɱ) vɑn də(n) ˈɦʏl]; born 18 August 1976) is a Dutch columnist and politician. She was elected to the House of Representatives for the Labour Party during the 2017 general election. Since October, 2022 she serves as Director of DutchCulture, a Dutch organisation for international cultural cooperation.
