= Maarten Hijink =

Dutch politician (born 1983)

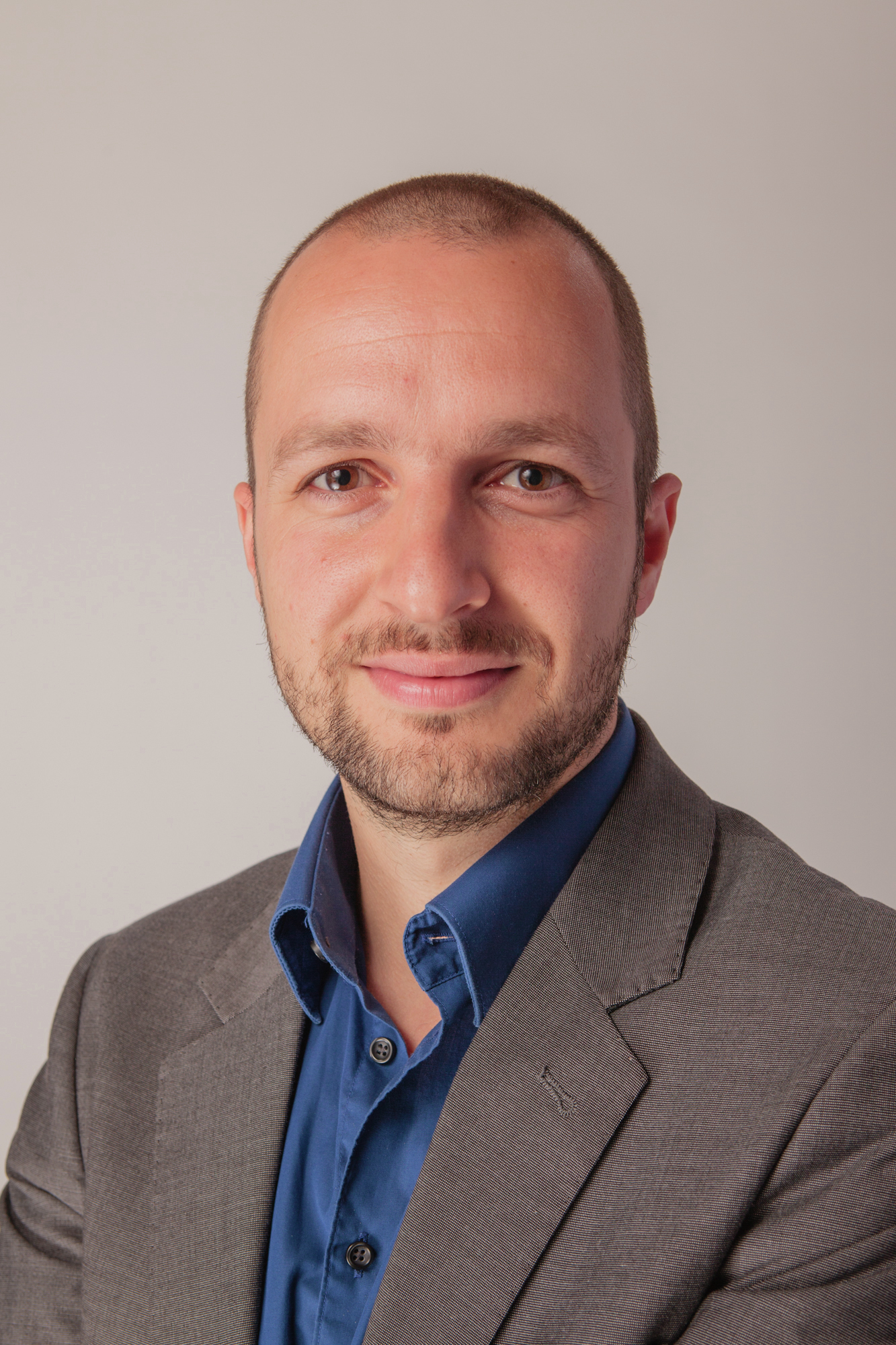
Maarten Hijink candidacy portrait

Hendrik Pieter Maarten Hijink (born 24 May 1983) is a Dutch politician who served as a Socialist Party member of the House of Representatives from 23 March 2017 until 20 April 2023.
