= Simon Geleijnse =

Dutch politician (born 1973)

Member of the House of Representatives
- In office 12 March 2019 – 26 June 2019
- In office 7 November 2018 – 27 February 2019

Member of the Rijswijk Municipal Council
- In office 30 March 2022 – 10 October 2023

Personal details
- Born: 19 December 1973 (age 52) Goes, Netherlands
- Party: NSC (since 2023)
- Other political affiliations: CDA (2001–2012; 2021–2023); 50PLUS (2012–2021)

Simon Geleijnse (born 19 December 1973) is a Dutch politician. From 2018 to 2019, he served as a member of the House of Representatives on two separate occasions.

Since 2 July 2024, he is the political assistant of Minister of the Interior and Kingdom Relations Judith Uitermark.
