= Martin Wörsdörfer =

Dutch politician

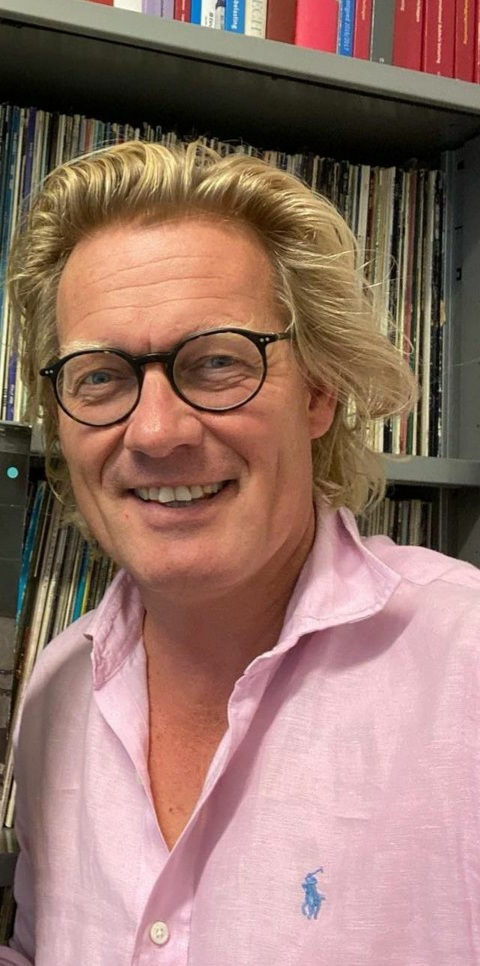

Member of the House of Representatives
- In office 23 March 2017 – 30 March 2021

Personal details
- Born: 20 January 1972 (age 53); Enschede, Netherlands
- Political party: People's Party for Freedom and Democracy (since 1996)

Martin Wörsdörfer (born 20 January 1972) is a Dutch politician who has served as a member of the House of Representatives between 23 March 2017 and 30 March 2021. He is a member of the People's Party for Freedom and Democracy (VVD). Since May 2022 he is an alderman of Oostzaan.
