= Arne Weverling =

Dutch politician

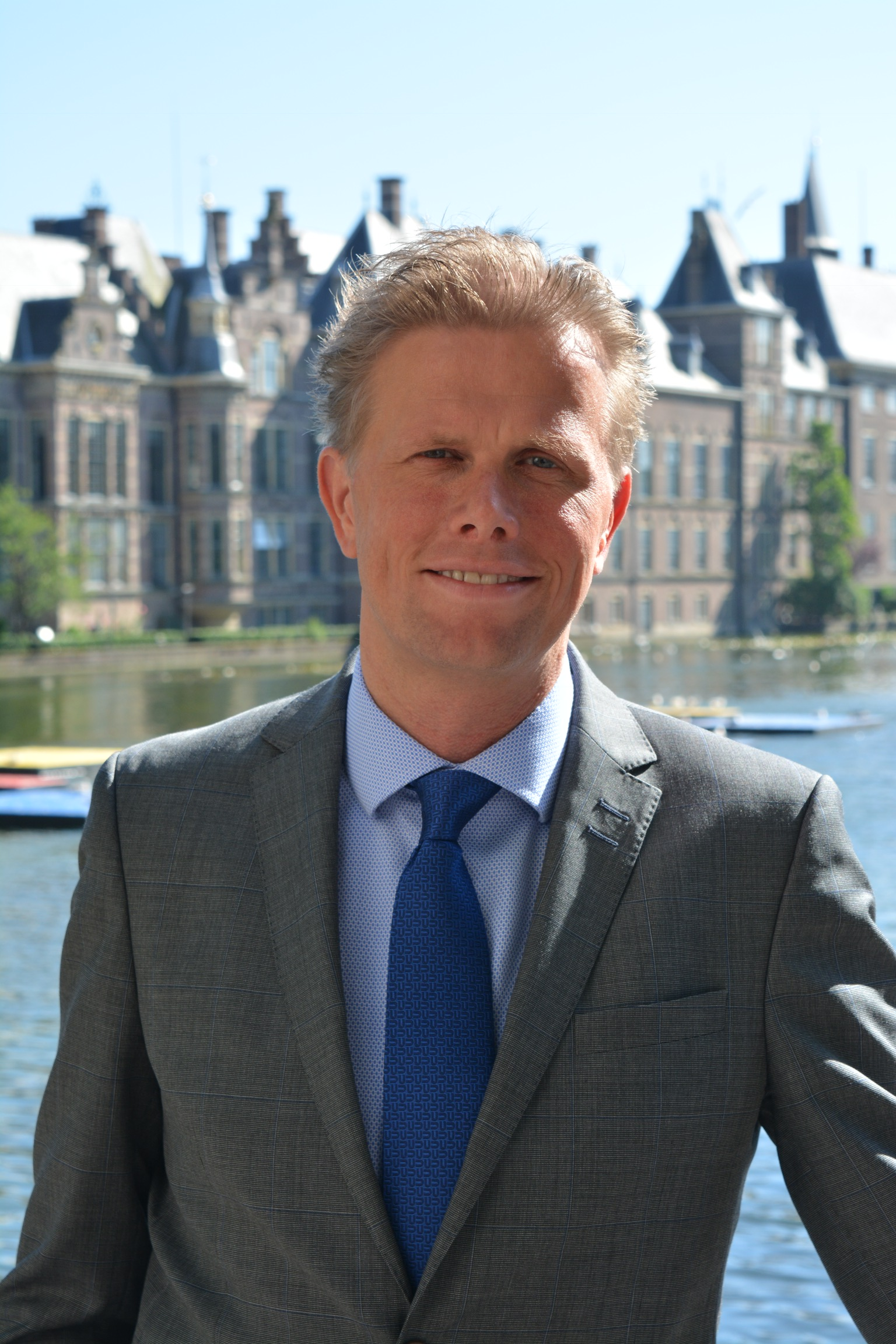

Member of the House of Representatives
- Incumbent
- Assumed office 23 March 2017

Personal details
- Born: 30 August 1974 (age 51) The Hague
- Party: People's Party for Freedom and Democracy
- Occupation: Politician

Arne Weverling (born 30 August 1974, in The Hague) is a Dutch politician. As a member of the People's Party for Freedom and Democracy (VVD) he has been an MP since 23 March 2017.
