= Zohair El Yassini =

Dutch politician

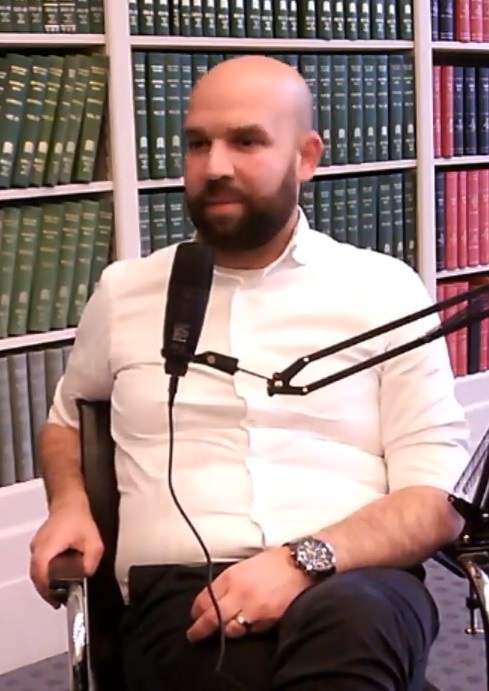
Zohair El Yassini in 2020.

Zohair El Yassini (born 17 November, 1979) is a Dutch politician from the People's Party for Freedom and Democracy.

== Electoral history ==
Electoral history of Zohair El Yassini
| Year | Body | Party | Pos. | Votes | Result | | Ref. |
| Year | Body | Party | Pos. | Votes | Party seats | Individual | Ref. |
|---|---|---|---|---|---|---|---|
| 2021 | House of Representatives | People's Party for Freedom and Democracy | 15 | 1,401 | 34 | Won | |
