= Antoinette Laan-Geselschap =

Dutch politician

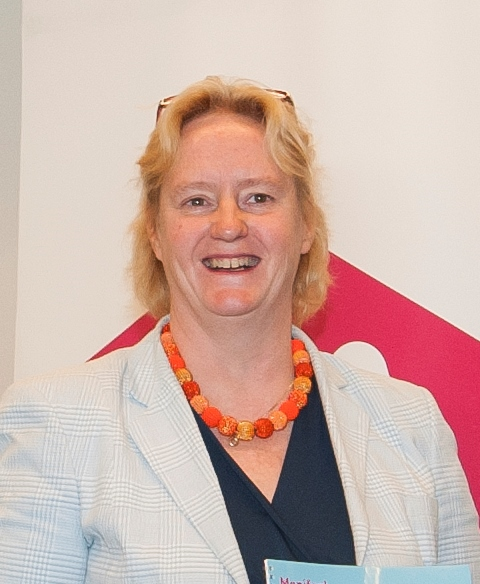
Laan-Geselschap in 2014

Antoinette José Marie Laan-Geselschap (born 6 April 1965 in Enschede) is a Dutch politician, who served in the House of Representatives for the People's Party for Freedom and Democracy (Volkspartij voor Vrijheid en Democratie) from October 2017 until March 2021. In 2010 and between 2014 and 2017, she served on the Rotterdam City Council. From 2010 until 2014, she was an alderwoman of Rotterdam. She has been again an alderwoman since 6 April 2021, this time of the neighbouring city of Schiedam.

She studied public administration at the Erasmus University Rotterdam, and was a member of the former government executive of the borough of Kralingen-Crooswijk from 1998 until 2004.
