= Kelly Regterschot =

Dutch politician

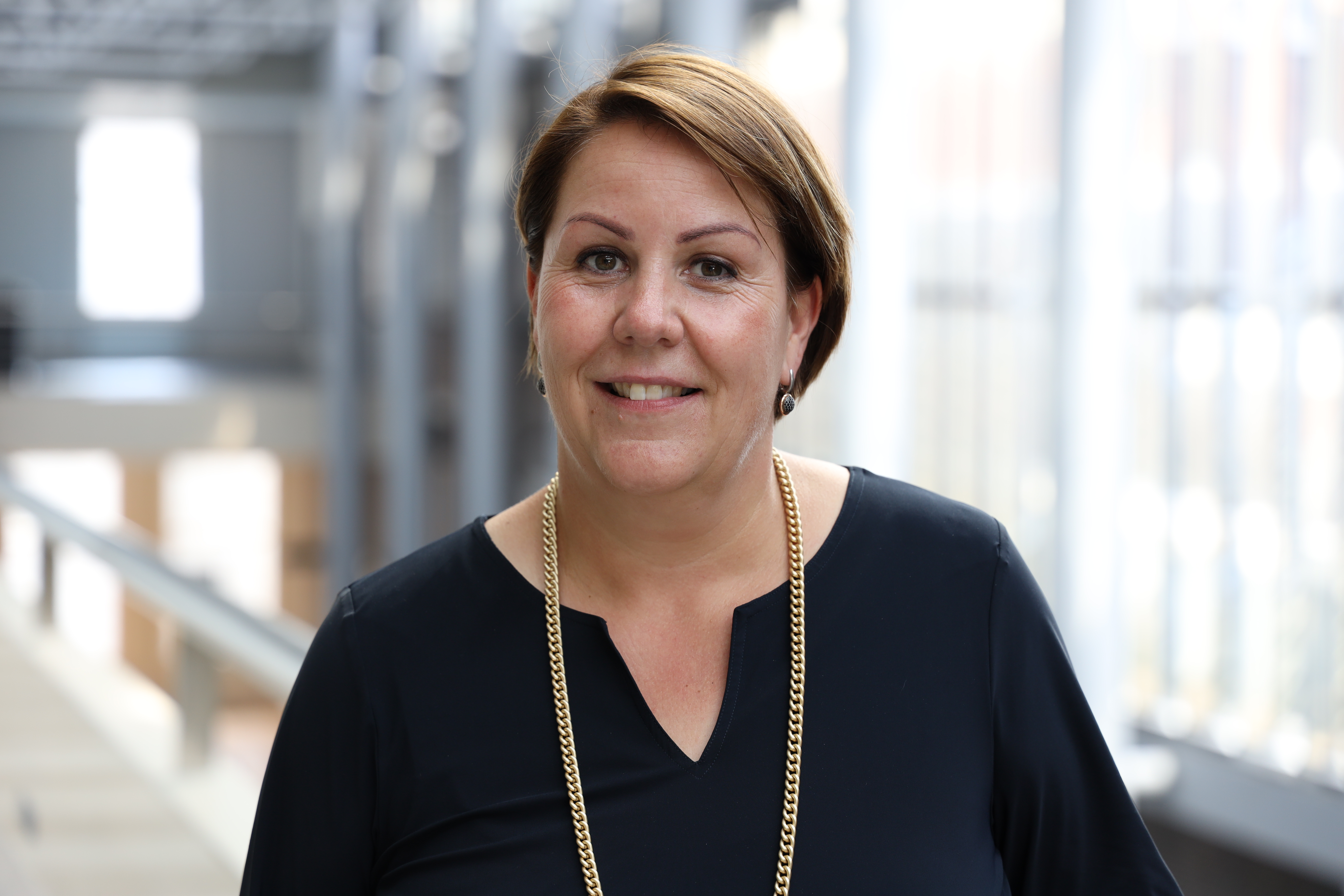
Kelly Regterschot

Kelly Regterschot (born 22 February 1975) is a Dutch politician, who served as a Member of Parliament for the People's Party for Freedom and Democracy (Volkspartij voor Vrijheid en Democratie) between 25 June and 2 July 2019.

== Electoral history ==
Electoral history of Kelly Regterschot
Year	Body	Party	Pos.	Votes	Result		Ref.
Year	Body	Party	Pos.	Votes	Party seats	Individual	Ref.
2021	House of Representatives	People's Party for Freedom and Democracy	36	7,418	34	Lost (Note: Regterschot was appointed to the body later during the term due to a vacancy.)	
