= Mahir Alkaya =

Dutch politician (born 1988)

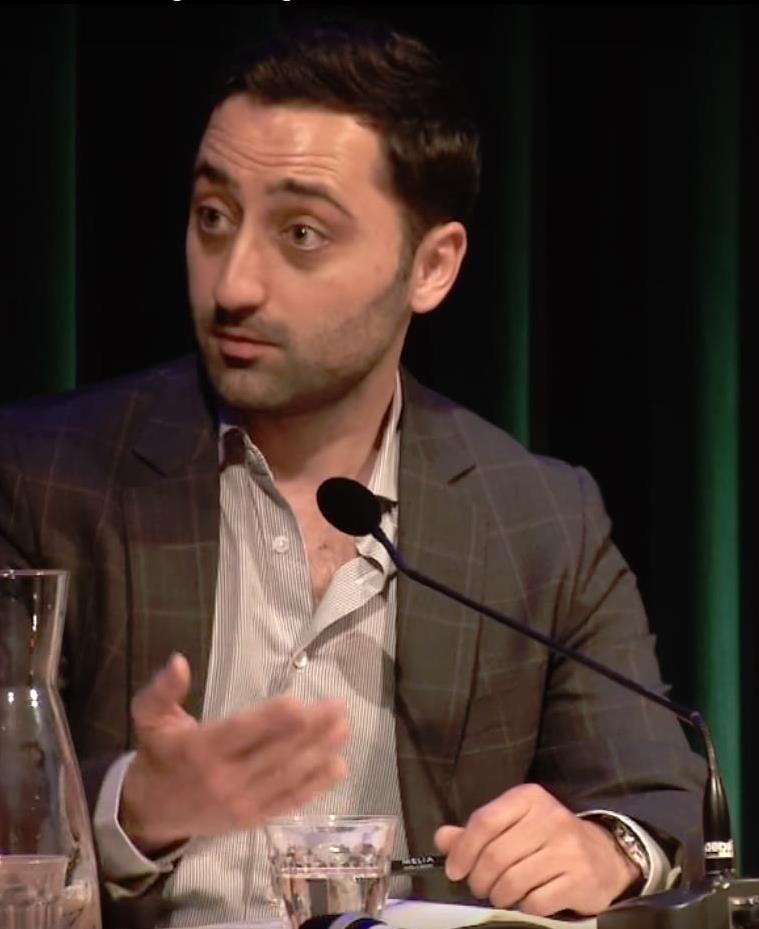
Mahir Alkaya during a debate in Amsterdam in May 2018.

Mahir Önder Alkaya (born 6 July 1988) is a Dutch politician who has been a Socialist Party member of the House of Representatives since 18 January 2018.

On 24 July 2023, he announced he would stand down at the 2023 Dutch general election.

== Education ==
Alkaya went to Amsterdams Lyceum, and graduated from Delft University of Technology.
