= Jessica van Eijs =

Member of the Dutch House of Representatives

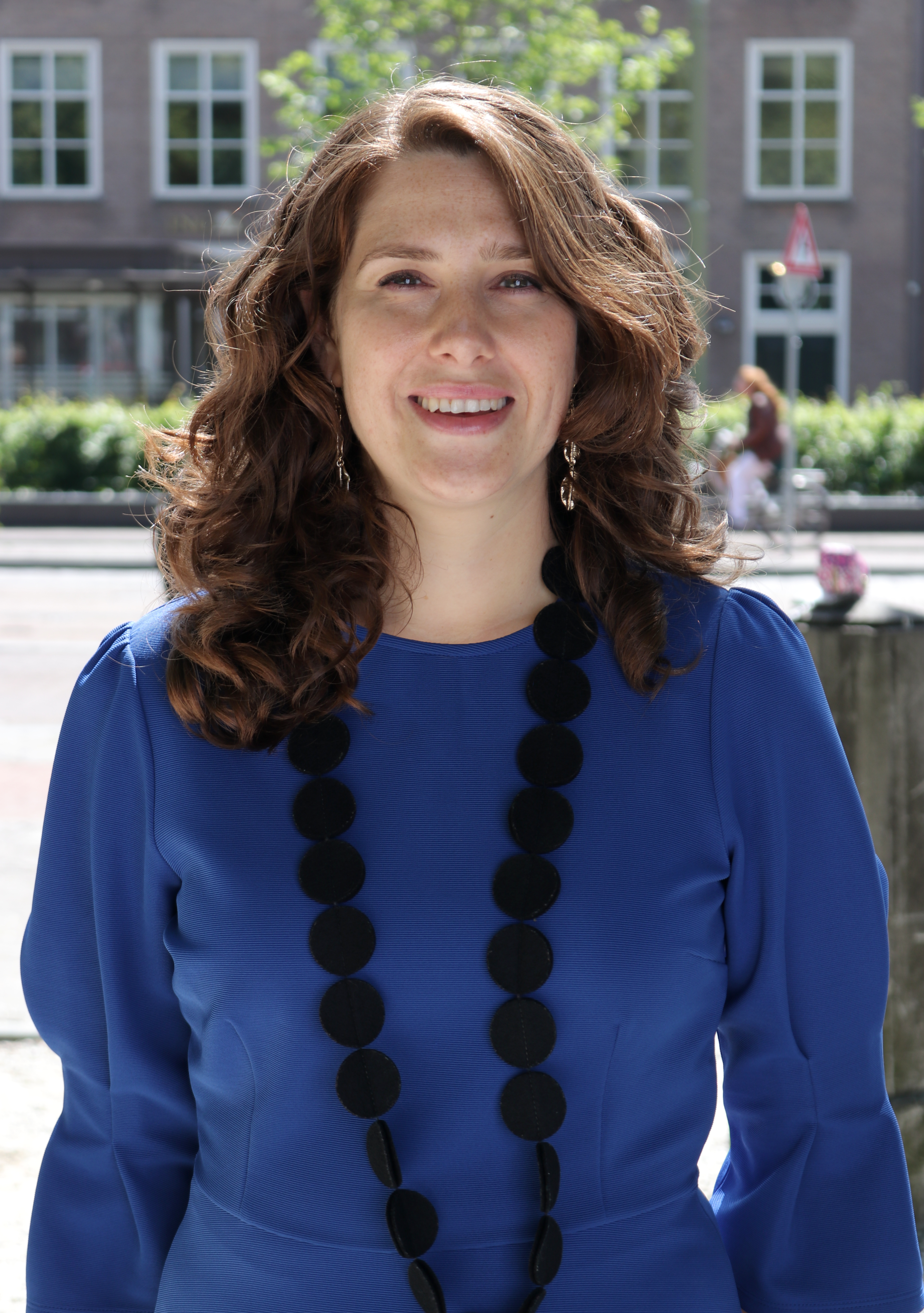

Member of the House of Representatives
- In office 23 March 2017 – 31 March 2021

Member of the Eindhoven municipal council
- In office 2012–2017

Personal details
- Born: Jessica van Eijs; 8 August 1981 (age 44) Nijmegen, Netherlands
- Party: Democrats 66

Jessica Marie Catherine van Eijs (born 8 August 1981 in Nijmegen) is a Dutch politician serving in the House of Representatives since 2017 as a member of the Democrats 66. In 2012, she joined the municipal council of Eindhoven, and left for the 2017 general election. Hard of hearing and understanding of deaf community needs, she has called for Dutch Sign Language to receive official recognition as a minority language.
