= Tobias van Gent =

Dutch politician (born 1967)

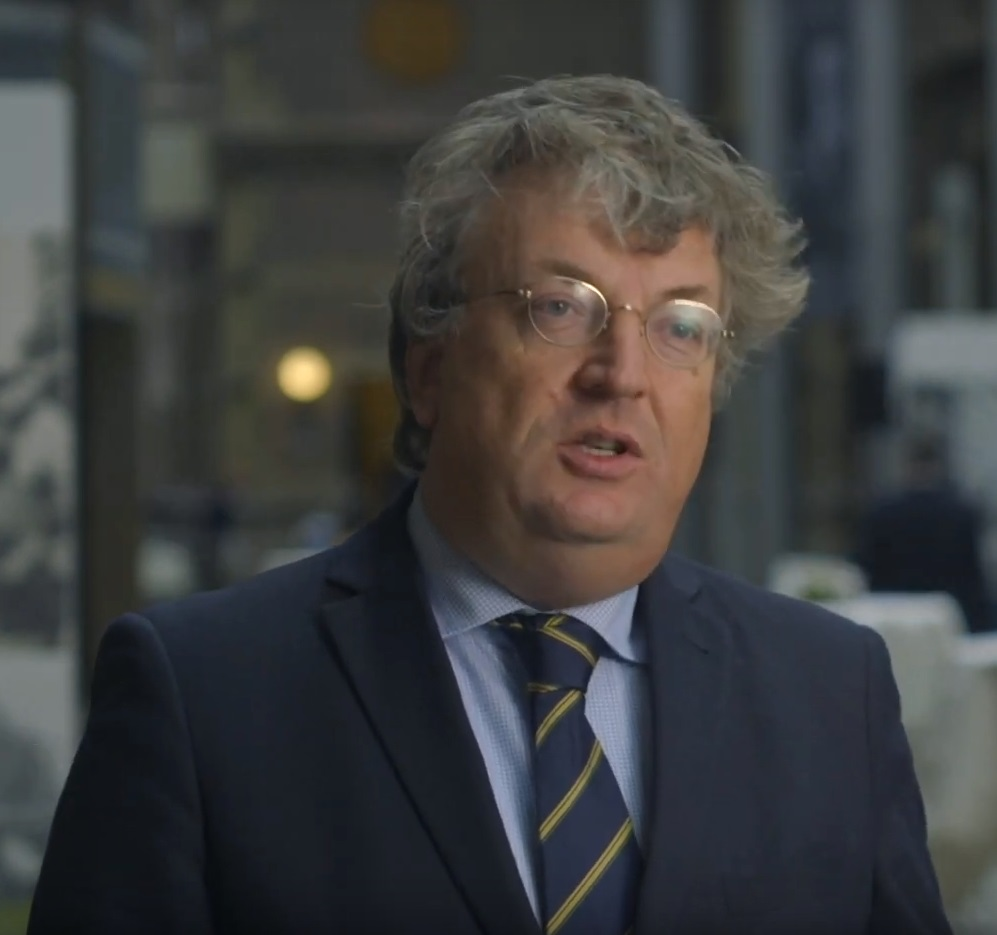
T. van Gent

Tobias van Gent (born 14 January 1967) is a Dutch historian and politician, who served as a Member of Parliament for the People's Party for Freedom and Democracy (VVD, Volkspartij voor Vrijheid en Democratie) from 5 September 2018 until 31 March 2021. He served in the provincial council of Zeeland from March 2011 to March 2019. He is currently working at University College Roosevelt in Middelburg as a professor in history and political sciences.
