= List of candidates in the 2021 Dutch general election =

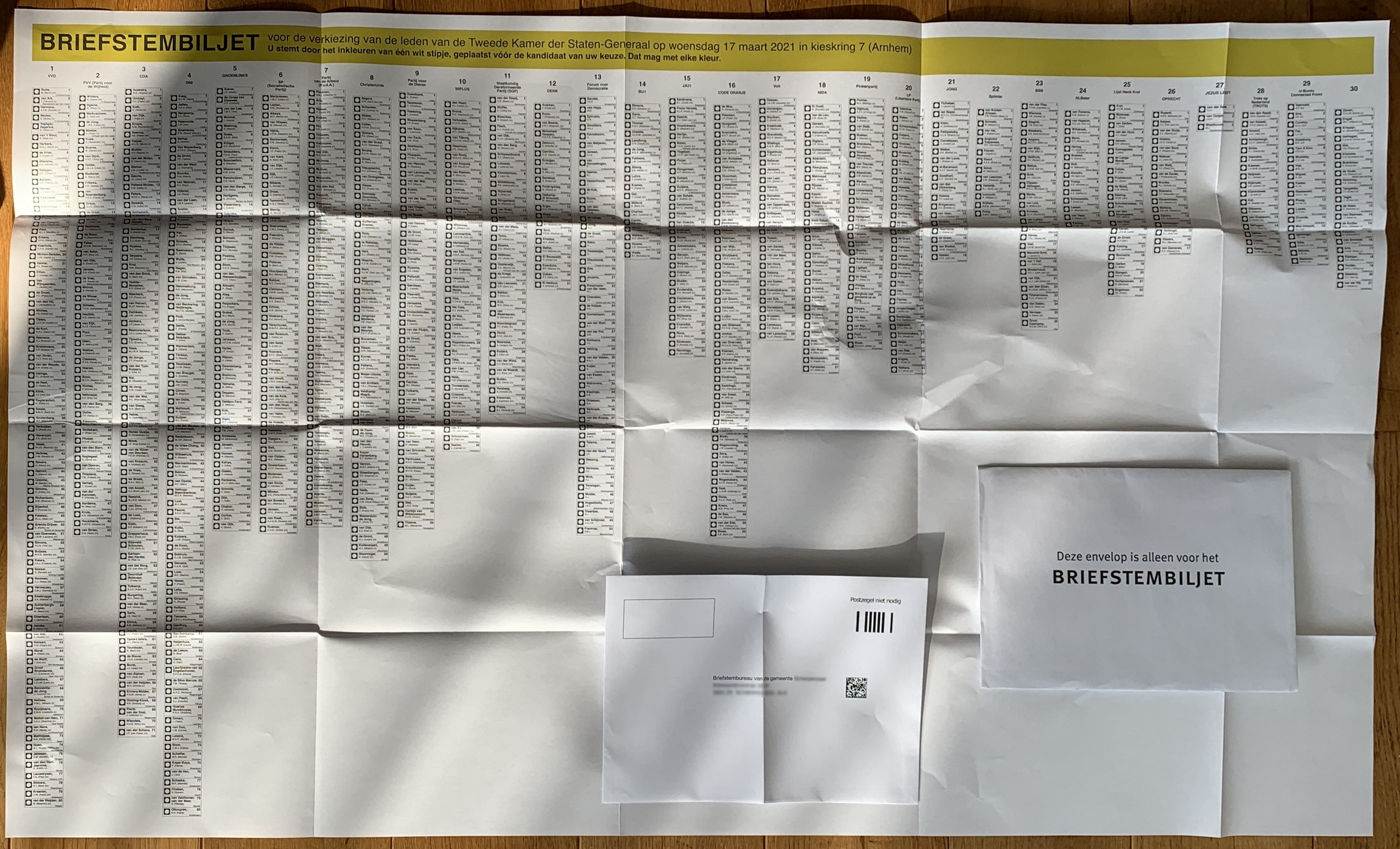
Ballot paper for the 2021 general election in the electoral district Arnhem.

Composition of the House after the general election: BIJ1: 1 Volt: 3 Denk: 3 50+: 1 GL: 8 SP: 9 PvdD: 6 PvdA: 9 D66: 24 CU: 5 SGP: 3 VVD: 34 CDA: 15 BBB: 1 JA21: 3 FvD: 8 PVV: 17

For the 2021 Dutch general election, 37 electoral lists were successfully submitted, the highest number since the Second World War. A total of 1,579 candidates were on these lists.

The 150 seats were awarded to the 17 party lists who received more votes than the electoral threshold (69.486 votes). Candidates who received more votes than the preference threshold were awarded a seat first and the other seats were awarded based on position on the list. The preference threshold for this election was 17,372 votes (25% of the electoral threshold). Three candidates would have not been elected based on position on the list, but received enough preference votes: Lisa Westerveld, Kauthar Bouchallikht (both GroenLinks) and Marieke Koekkoek (Volt).

== 1: People's Party for Freedom and Democracy ==
Candidate list for the People's Party for Freedom and Democracy
Position	Candidate	Votes	Result
1	Mark Rutte	1,977,651	Elected
2	Tamara van Ark	73,125	Elected
3	Sophie Hermans	24,115	Elected
4	Bente Becker	19,873	Elected
5	Dilan Yeşilgöz-Zegerius	45,630	Elected
6	Bas van 't Wout	4,074	Elected
7	Mark Harbers	4,438	Elected
8	Aukje de Vries	9,146	Elected
9	Dennis Wiersma	1,807	Elected
10	Ockje Tellegen	3,600	Elected
11	Thierry Aartsen	5,441	Elected
12	Eelco Heinen	679	Elected
13	Queeny-Aimée Rajkowski	3,246	Elected
14	Roelien Kamminga	6,334	Elected
15	Zohair El Yassini	1,401	Elected
16	Thom van Campen	2,821	Elected
17	Mariëlle Paul	2,633	Elected
18	Silvio Erkens	4,043	Elected
19	Daniel Koerhuis	2,194	Elected
20	Ingrid Michon-Derkzen	1,654	Elected
21	Peter Valstar	4,102	Elected
22	Ulysse Ellian	1,931	Elected
23	Jeroen van Wijngaarden	879	Elected
24	Peter de Groot	1,093	Elected
25	Jacqueline van den Hil	3,543	Elected
26	Fahid Minhas	699	Elected
27	Judith Tielen	2,127	Elected
28	Daan de Kort	5,714	Elected
29	Rudmer Heerema	2,119	Elected
30	Ruben Brekelmans	1,539	Elected
31	Pim van Strien	463	Elected
32	Hatte van der Woude	2,312	Elected
33	Folkert Idsinga	483	Elected
34	Daan de Neef	928	Elected
35	Jan Klink	1,092	Replacement
36	Kelly Regterschot	7,418	Replacement
37	Bart Smals	736	Replacement
38	Mark Strolenberg	4,743	Replacement
39	Ruud Verkuijlen	547	Replacement
40	Erik Haverkort	1,876	Replacement
41	Marinus Tabak	1,631	
42	Dorien Verbree	4,771	
43	Harry Bevers	547	Replacement
44	Hawre Rahimi	999	Replacement
45	Martijn Grevink	158	Replacement
46	Chris Simons	653	Replacement
47	Simone Richardson	1,525	Replacement
48	Yvonne Bijenhof	3,397	Replacement
49	Max Patelski	985	
50	Kathy Arends-Drijver	911	
51	Laurens van Doeveren	492	
52	Tim Simons	1,115	
53	Martijn Buijsse	781	
54	Frederik Peters	449	
55	Ronald Bakker	455	
56	Kees Noomen	572	
57	Sanneke Vermeulen	1,100	
58	Sabine Koebrugge	2,058	
59	Mark Achterbergh-Copier	682	
60	Jenny Elbertsen	699	
61	Barry Jacobs	755	
62	Saskia van Dijk	740	
63	Hugo Bellaart	457	
64	Rebin Maref	1,599	
65	Ivo de Wolff	395	
66	Laurence Groot Bruinderink	302	
67	Lars Lambers	1,754	
68	Laurine Bonnevits-de Jong	549	
69	Mirjam Nelisse	1,176	
70	Liesbeth Rooijmans	574	
71	Sharona Malfait-van Ham	730	
72	René ten Have	134	
73	Henk Matthijsse	361	
74	Roelof Theun Hoen	310	
75	Sander Janssen	477	
76	Edith van den Ham-Jaarsma	1,542	
77	Filip Lauwerysen	55	
78	Bart Bikkers	199	
79	Kees Kraanen	676	
80	Maarten van der Weijden	4,116	
Total		2,279,130	

== 2: Party for Freedom ==
Candidate list for the Party for Freedom
Position	Candidate	Votes	Result
1	Geert Wilders	1,004,605	Elected
2	Fleur Agema	65,995	Elected
3	Gidi Markuszower	1,245	Elected
4	Léon de Jong	1,991	Elected
5	Vicky Maeijer	2,709	Elected
6	Alexander Kops	1,128	Elected
7	Martin Bosma	22,781	Elected
8	Tony van Dijck	466	Elected
9	Lilian Helder	3,458	Elected
10	Barry Madlener	532	Elected
11	Sietse Fritsma	264	Elected
12	Danai van Weerdenburg	840	Elected
13	Dion Graus	1,194	Elected
14	Machiel de Graaf	515	Elected
15	Edgar Mulder	799	Elected
16	Harm Beertema	456	Elected
17	Raymond de Roon	520	Elected
18	Marjolein Faber	1,057	
19	Roy van Aalst	807	
20	Emiel van Dijk	176	
21	Chris Jansen	338	
22	Henk de Vree	247	
23	Nicole Moinat	871	
24	Daniëlle de Winter	1,022	
25	Sebastiaan Stöteler	338	
26	Hidde Heutink	614	
27	Toon van Dijk	288	
28	Joeri Pool	233	
29	Marco Deen	238	
30	Hendrik Wakker	558	
31	René Claassen	657	
32	Anthony Heeren	100	
33	Maikel Boon	642	
34	Elmar Vlottes	263	
35	Erik Veltmeijer	396	
36	Harry van den Berg	428	
37	Tessa Dulfer	532	
38	Thijs Klaassen	308	
39	Peter Smitskam	153	
40	Daryl Pfoster	146	
41	Vincent van den Born	176	
42	Sjors Nagtegaal	299	
43	Arthur van Dooren	651	
44	Folkert Thiadens	131	
45	Coen Verheij	307	
46	Patricia van der Kammen	1,015	
47	Max Aardema	831	
48	Sebastian Kruis	93	
49	Robert Housmans	279	
50	Gom van Strien	790	
Total		1,565,861	

== 3: Christian Democratic Appeal ==
Candidate list for the Christian Democratic Appeal
Position	Candidate	Votes	Result
1	Wopke Hoekstra	437,240	Elected
2	Pieter Omtzigt	342,472	Elected
3	Anne Kuik	32,945	Elected
4	Inge van Dijk	16,851	Elected
5	Raymond Knops	8,881	Elected
6	Pieter Heerma	1,393	Elected
7	Mona Keijzer	18,031	Elected
8	Agnes Mulder	5,736	Elected
9	Harry van der Molen	3,955	Elected
10	Lucille Werner	7,133	Elected
11	Jaco Geurts	4,282	Elected
12	Hilde Palland-Mulder	3,990	Elected
13	René Peters	2,029	Elected
14	Derk Boswijk	1,603	Elected
15	Mustafa Amhaouch	3,060	Elected
16	Joba van den Berg	2,808	Replacement
17	Henri Bontenbal	1,345	Replacement
18	Evert Jan Slootweg	665	Replacement
19	Wytske Postma	3,131	
20	Julius Terpstra	665	
21	Harmen Krul	1,985	Replacement
22	Bart van den Brink	1,655	Replacement
23	Eline Vedder	9,377	Replacement
24	Frank Meerkerk	667	
25	Martijn van Helvert	15,212	
26	Jantine Zwinkels	1,442	
27	Jaap Jonkers	753	
28	Jelle Beemsterboer	6,275	
29	Eveline Tijmstra	880	
30	Marieke Nass	3,962	
31	Froukje de Jonge	955	
32	Lea van der Tuin	449	
33	Mustafa Bal	517	
34	Cees de Jong	1,346	
35	Piet-Cees van der Wel	3,225	
36	Bert van Steeg	99	
37	Gabrielle Heine	1,795	
38	Michiel Dijkman	373	
39	Rudesindo Nunez Queija	406	
40	Inge Mous	224	
41	Patricia van de Vijver	371	
42	Huibert van Rossum	169	
43	Douwe de Vries	2,703	
44	Bo ter Braak	1,242	
45	Evert Jan van Asselt	139	
46	Martin Reesink	214	
47	Chris van Dam	9,360	
48	Ingeborg ter Laak	323	
49	Karsten Klein	3,962	
50	Ferdinand Grapperhaus	1,502	
51	Ank Bijleveld	971	

=== Christian Democratic Appeal: Regional candidates ===
Regional candidates for Christian Democratic Appeal
Candidate	Votes	Result	Position per electoral district																			
Candidate	Votes	Result	1	2	3	4	5	6	7	8	9	10	11	12	13	14	15	16	17	18	19	20
Patricia van Aaken	64															52						
Johan Aalberts	75																	55				
Ria Aartsen-den Harder	170								52													
Thomas Adams	58																		54			
Fatma Aktas	87													54								
Frits Alberts	48				52																	
Arie van Alphen	23								65													
Sarah Alsalhawi	29																75					
Jan-Nico Appelman	31						54															
Joop Atsma	137			69																		
Uilkje Attema-de Groot	95			70																		
Devie Badloe	98														57		54					
Huseyin Bahar	27																			62		
Janny Bakker-Klein	55											53										
John Bankers	139																			52		
Lucille Barbosa Vazquez-Biesbroeck	12													59								
Bram Beemster	119												54									
Eveline Been	10														63							
Jack Begijn	77																	67				
Riekje van Belle	29						57															
Iekje Berg	74															71						
Wil van den Berg	15			67																		
Dick Berghuis	35		52																			
Jannelies van Berkel-Vissers	49									60												
Johanna Besteman-de Vries	25															65						
Jan-Willem van den Beukel	29																71					
Anna Bijleveld	13														65							
Bearn Bilker	60			63																		
Roderik Bin	8																	75				
Falgun Binnendijk	53												52									
Joanne Blaak-van de Lagemaat	65															62						
Jander de Blauw	48								63													
Peter van Boekel	101																			54		
Luciënne Boelsma-Hoekstra	235			56																		
Ryanna de Boer	4						58															
Jan Boersma	31																			68		
Adri Bom-Lemstra	193														74	80	80					
Jaap Bond	105										56	61	62									
Paul Boogaard	82															73						
Jacob Boonstra	37		53																			
Ronald Bootsma	53			60																		
Jan Dirk van der Borg	111								53													
Jaap Borst	39								64													
Elly van den Bosch-Damen	22																66					
Els van den Bosch-Swagerman	100												57									
Maarten Bosma	52				63																	
Margreet Bosma-van Wieren	128					57																
Marieke Braber-Schot	15																	61				
Caroline van Brakel	65																			70		
Ton Braspenning	236																		52			
Hilbert Bredemeijer	13													70								
Berrie Broeders	64																		59			
Job van den Broek	11									66												
Mark van den Broek	114																		57			
Karin van den Broeke	60																	59				
Chantal Broekhuis	55									52												
Gert Brouwer	22		54																			
Désirée Brummans	77																		63			
Mark Buck	110							54														
Frank Buijs	37																59					
Christiaan Buis	136									55												
Henk Bulle	20		55																			
Irma Bultman	59																58					
Ria van der Burg-van Leeuwen	54																62					
Wim Burgering	49							57	56													
Floortje Buteijn-Leemans	19																	57				
Wim van de Camp	26													69	73	79	79					
Conny Castelein	16														59							
Bart Claassen	96																			64		
Ineke Couwenberg	151																		69			
Hans Crebas	29						69															
Leo Cuijpers	110																			59		
Nayma Dahri-Loualidi	23		56																			
Bauke Dam	137			52																		
Jacco van Dam	16														58							
Niek Damen	8														62							
Ron Davids	16														52							
Bob van der Deijl	55																67					
Diana Dekker	80												61									
Daniëlle van Deutekom	42											59										
Steven van Die	39															60						
Ralph Diederen	212																				56	
Simon Dijk	45												58									
Jeannette Doll-Gras	3													68								
Marcel van Dongen	10						65															
Marionne van Dongen-de Kruijf	119																			75		
Trudy Doornhof-Molenaar	232								54													
Harma Dost	64		57																			
Friso Douwstra	67			58																		
Ingrid Drent-Sinot	36		59																			
Erik Drenth	36		58																			
Peter Drenth	195							58	60													
Rosita Drigpal-Nagesar	69													55								
Yme Drost	116					54																
Gijs Dupont	18																57					
Ties Eigenhuis	33											60										
Wim Eilering	46			62																		
Ruben Eisses	34		60																			
Hans van Ek	14																68					
Belinda Elfrink	241								59													
Luit Engelage	36		61																			
Sandra van Engelen	64											55										
Anna Ermers-Mulder	146							59	67													
Engbert van Esch	31			59																		
Christine Eskes-van Utrecht	12														75							
Robbert van Ettekoven	88									57												
Christiene Everaars	14													52								
Janet Frankemölle-Bolier	69																		60			
Ellie Franssen-Muijtjens	188																				53	
Astrid Frey	2													61								
Ton de Gans	24																76					
Tessa Geelen	472																				59	
Lenny Geluk-Poortvliet	100									68												
Petrina Geluk-den Engelsman	43																	64				
Johan Geraats	534																				58	
Dorenda Gerts	42																60					
Laura van de Giessen	29		62																			
René van Ginderen	125																		66			
Mieke van Ginkel-van Maren	29															54						
Jos van Ginneken	116																	53				
Gerrit Goedhart	52																65					
Joost de Goffau	42																	62				
Tosca Goorden-Winde	139																		67			
Johan Goos	51						60															
Daniël de Groot	7													64								
Kees Grootswagers	155																		62			
Maurits de Haan	10															70						
Fons d’ Haens	76																			71		
Alex Hallema	16														64							
Marcel ’t Hart	60															63						
Rogier Havelaar	16										52											
Marjan Heidekamp-Prins	38		63																			
Emma van der Heijden	64								66													
Peter Heijkoop	55															77						
Dick Hellinga	20						56															
Margreet van Hemert-van der Lans	7													63								
Herma Hemmen	35		64																			
Joost Hendriks	75																			58		
Alma den Hertog-Fluks	30		65																			
Jelle Hijmissen	22						59															
Sonja Hilgenga-van Dam	40				59																	
Jonathan Hoang	15														55							
Fokke Hoekstra	20						61															
Linda Hofman-Jobse	300																			60		
Koos Hopster	6						68															
Elise Hordijk	53						52															
Gerben Horst	30									59												
Easther Houmes	56																	54				
Daniël Huising	360															72						
Henk ten Hulscher	8				61																	
Pim Jansen	5													53								
Wim Jansen	28																	65				
Mark Janssen	223																			65		
Marc Jeucken	109																			61		
Egge Jan de Jonge	39						70															
Daniël Joppe	25																	73				
Marnick Joustra	63		66																			
Henk Jumelet	218				65																	
Koos Karssen	44															58	70					
Gerben Karssenberg	2							56														
Jennie Kempenaar-van Ittersum	71						53															
Piet van de Kerkhove	64																	56				
Max Keulaerds	4													66								
Marianne Kloosterboer-Dijkstra	31																	66				
Dirk Jan Knol	23																53					
Jo Kodde	22																	72				
Pieter Koeman	14																	63				
Willemien Koning-Hoeve	67												55									
Daniëlle Koster	7													57								
Arjan Kraijo	11															53						
Erik Jan Kreuze	74				60																	
Frans Kuppens	142																			57		
Mart van Lagen	72					56																
Esther de Lange	33														72	78	78					
Gerdien de Lange-Leguijt	20															69						
Sven de Langen	33														76							
Christa van de Langenberg	94																			74		
Franko van Lankvelt	60																			69		
Siert Jan Lap	19						64															
Elisabeth van Leeuwen-Klink	31															74						
Bas van der Linden	66															55						
Stef Luijten	567																			53		
Pauline Maat	130											57										
Piet Machielsen	53																			66		
Siwart Mackintosh	12																	58				
Freek Marchal	0																					53
Henna Mathura-Dewkinandan	65													56								
Anne van der Meer	66								57													
Kees van der Meer	8														66							
Thirsa van der Meer	146											58										
Cilia Meerman-van Benthem	55															59						
Peter Meij	42															61						
Roy Meijer	44				53																	
Pien Meppelink	21																77					
Fokelien van der Meulen-Diever	91			66																		
Tonny Meulensteen	41																			63		
Henk Middendorp	13				62																	
Gerrit Jan Miedema	19																73					
Gerard Migchels	45									65												
Mara Min	16		67																			
Geertje Mink	78																		64			
René Molenaar	37																	52				
Ulfert Molenhuis	26		68																			
Jan Nabers	158					55																
Thijs Nell	23											56										
Klaas Neutel	22				57																	
Rick Nooij	114												53									
Arjan Noorthoek	74									53												
Angeliek Noortman-Nieuwendijk	63									54												
Annemiek Nuijens	29												59									
Antoine van den Oever	6														60							
Hielke Onnink	1													65								
Matthijs van Oosten	101																		53			
Andrea Oosting-Klock	92								68													
Bart Overgaauw	48															64						
Ada Overwater	8																	74				
Jannes Paas	28		69																			
Micheline Paffen-Zeenni	60									67												
Kavish Partiman	46													60								
Jolanda Pierik-van der Snel	72								69													
Albert van der Ploeg	98			57																		
Sietske Poepjes	362			71																		
Ewoud Poerink	8										55											
Gosse Postma	80												60									
Nick Prinsen	1													62								
Marieke Pronk	5														69							
Rajinderkoemar Ramcharan	105									63												
Romana dos Ramos-Verstraeten	9																			73		
Henk Reinders	30				64																	
Aart Reussing	78						55															
Corrie Righolt-Dam	43															56						
Anja de Rijk-de Jong	72																56					
Antoinette Roetgerink	11														61							
Michel Rogier	19													67								
Marjanne Romkes-Foppen	30						67															
Susanne de Roy van Zuidewijn-Rive	18										53											
Victoria Ruijs	41									56												
Luc Rullens	197																		58			
Caspar Rutten	157																		56			
Ilse Saris	556								58													
Jan Pieter van der Schans	120								71													
Ernst van der Schans	52							53														
Tom Scheepstra	30				55																	
Frank Schellenboom	37														54							
Ad Schenk	51																	68				
Jaap Schep	25																69					
Harold Schonewille	48									61												
Bea Schouten	191							52														
Janny Schouwerwou	11			55																		
Harold Schroeder	161																				60	
René Segers-Hoogendoorn	7														70							
Jan Willem Sietsma	84			53																		
Jacky Silos-Knaap	59															67						
Gerard Slegers	26												56									
Arie Slob	31															75						
Marc Smellink	226					52																
Danny Smit	91				58																	
Nicole Smits	30						62															
Koos Sneek	127																					52
Merijn Snoek	69											54										
Lisanne Spanbroek	119					53																
Robert van der Spek	40			61																		
Ton Spek	41															57						
Marieke van der Spek-den Besten	251									58												
Antoon Splinter	137																				52	
Irene Spoelstra	88			65																		
Jouke Spoelstra	159			64																		
Ruud Spohr	60																		70			
Jacob Klaas Star	19		70																			
Denis Steijaert	82																	76				
Mirjam van der Stelt	31																72					
Meindert Stolk	19																74					
Olaf Streutker	41											52										
Louis Swinkels	51																			67		
Wubbo Tempel	10														68							
Barend Tensen	73																55					
Bart Teunissen	47								62													
Anne Thielen	292																				57	
Marius Tielemans	136																			55		
Marcel van Tol	47																64					
Arjan Tolkamp	321							55	55													
Adri Totté	72																	69				
Joost Uijtewaal	24									64												
Marian Uitdewilligen	70						66															
Geertje Veenstra	36		71																			
Karin van der Velde-Ronda	56			68																		
Leroy van de Ven	35																			72		
Tom Verhaegh	200																				54	
Marjon Verkleij-Lemmers	253																52					
Marjan Vermaire	22																	70				
Mitchel Vermeulen	59																	60				
Hans Peter Verroen	61																		55			
Jeltje Vliegenthart-Kuiken	34						63															
Wiljan Vloet	17														71	76						
Monique Vogelaar	35														53							
Angely Waajen-Crins	310																				55	
David Wan	235													58								
Jeroen Weerdenburg	30																		68			
Rinus van ’t Westeinde	91																	77				
Tess van de Wiel	96																		61			
Niko Wiendels	59								70													
Hanneke Wiersema	38				56																	
Marcel Willemsen	93																		65			
Branco Winkels	12														56							
Pieter Wisse	36																	71				
Robert de Wit	19		72																			
Claudia de Wit-Heuver	80									62												
Patricia Wouda	12										54											
Rob van Woudenberg	36															66						
Frans Wouters	44																			56		
Agnes Wubs-Kramer	58		73																			
Gerry Ypma-Liefers	56								61													
Christine Zandberg	8														67							
René Zoetemelk	35																61					
Gertjan Zuur	40				54																	
Rob Zwaard	60															68						
Kees van der Zwet	31																63					
Ria van Zwieten-van Sleen	125			54																		

== 4: Democrats 66 ==
Candidate list for the Democrats 66
Position	Candidate	Votes	Result
1	Sigrid Kaag	1,237,897	Elected
2	Rob Jetten	45,771	Elected
3	Vera Bergkamp	29,613	Elected
4	Jan Paternotte	6,685	Elected
5	Sjoerd Sjoerdsma	4,929	Elected
6	Salima Belhaj	15,414	Elected
7	Steven van Weyenberg	1,290	Elected
8	Tjeerd de Groot	4,856	Elected
9	Hanneke van der Werf	13,935	Elected
10	Raoul Boucke	3,518	Elected
11	Paul van Meenen	1,692	Elected
12	Hans Vijlbrief	947	Elected
13	Jeanet van der Laan	10,489	Elected
14	Joost Sneller	933	Elected
15	Wieke Paulusma	14,933	Elected
16	Faissal Boulakjar	2,875	Elected
17	Hülya Kat	15,620	Elected
18	Sidney Smeets	2,039	Elected
19	Rens Raemakers	9,699	Elected
20	Jorien Wuite	15,898	Elected
21	Kiki Hagen	24,485	Elected
22	Lisa van Ginneken	10,969	Elected
23	Alexander Hammelburg	841	Elected
24	Romke de Jong	2,280	Elected
25	Marijke van Beukering-Huijbregts	2,215	Replacement
26	Anne-Marijke Podt	3,919	Replacement
27	Fonda Sahla	3,087	Replacement
28	Hind Dekker-Abdulaziz	7,806	Replacement
29	Sjoerd Warmerdam	628	Replacement
30	Nazmi Türkkol	2,537	
31	Hans Teunissen	1,564	Replacement
32	Carline van Breugel	15,004	Replacement
33	Joan Nunnely	6,146	
34	Meyrem Çimen	1,555	
35	Loes ten Dolle	4,120	
36	Mahjoub Mathlouti	404	
37	David Kuijper	196	
38	Marleen van der Meulen-Kwakernaak	1,506	
39	Marcel Beukeboom	555	
40	Ojanne de Vries-Chang	1,981	
41	Kirsten Wilkeshuis	367	
42	Stijn Warmenhoven	661	
43	Wybren Bakker	567	
44	Marc van Opstal	481	
45	Marieke Vellinga-Beemsterboer	837	
46	Marja Lust	7,009	
47	Sonja Paauw	1,632	
48	Christine Bel	1,171	
49	Suat Kutlu	740	
50	Robert Kuipers	593	
51	Robin de Roon	194	
52	Gabriëlle Bekhuis	167	
53	Stef Stevens	327	
54	Marion Loor	168	
55	Pepijn Vemer	197	
56	Vinesh Lalta	552	
57	Rosita Girjasing	701	
58	Rob Hofland	230	
59	Constance Tiemens	204	
60	Eli Geoffroy	158	
61	Sarah Berckenkamp	160	
62	Laura Neijenhuis	417	
63	Bas de Leeuw	242	
64	Gjin Ceca	337	
65	Emma Laurijssens-van Engelenhoven	519	
66	Teresa da Silva Marcos	330	
67	Monique Zwetsloot	287	
68	Caecilia van Peski	419	
69	Rosanna Huertas Mulckhuyse	339	
70	Yasin Elmaci	160	
71	Corine van Dun	165	
72-74	Regional candidates		
75	Fatma Koşer Kaya	536	
76	Jan van de Ven	321	
77	Marietje Schaake	363	
78	Sumer Chaban	1,116	
79	Stientje van Veldhoven-van der Meer	548	
80	Kajsa Ollongren	3,123	
Total		1,565,861	

=== Democrats 66: Regional candidates ===
Regional candidates for Democrats 66
Candidate	Votes	Result	Position per electoral district																			
Candidate	Votes	Result	1	2	3	4	5	6	7	8	9	10	11	12	13	14	15	16	17	18	19	20
Hayo Apotheker	104			74																		
Henk Beerten	124							72														
Pim van den Berg	111									72												
Bob Bergsma	176				74																	
Magda Berndsen	47			73																		
Anouschka Biekman	78															73						
Céline Blom	310								73													
Martijn Braber	395					72																
Laurens Jan Brinkhorst	19													73								
Hayat Chidi	67									73												
Reinier van Dantzig	40										74											
Carinne Elion-Valter	133																		73			
Jaimi van Essen	254					74																
Mirik Milan Gelders	17										73											
Peter Gerrits	46		73																			
Floor Gordon-de Bruijn	149											74										
Fleur Gräper-van Koolwijk	300		74																			
Hodo Hassan	63																		74			
Thomas Hellebrand	0																					72
Jieskje Hollander	144			72																		
Emre Hoogduijn	99															74						
Jurenne Hooi	8																					74
Truus Houtepen-Kunnen	186																			74		
Marlou Jenneskens	931																				73	
Marjolein de Jong	26													72								
Robbert Kalff	46									74												
Ashley Karsemeijer	47							73														
Said Kasmi	59														73							
Eelco Keij	404													74								
Anry Kleine Deters	348				73																	
Gerdien Knikker	87											73										
Elly Konijn-Vermaas	289												74									
Martijn Leisink	193								72													
Jeroen van de Merwe	101																	73				
Elise Moeskops	39										72											
John Nederstigt	35											72										
Margie Nijs	205																	72				
Margreet Overmeen-Bakhuis	325					73																
Henk Pragt	67				72																	
Lia de Ridder	50																72					
Michiel Rijsberman	32						74															
Dylan Romeo	3																					73
Michiel Scheffer	113							74	74													
Dianne Schellekens	421																			73		
Gerard Schouw	54															72						
Cemile Sezer	71														72							
Robert Strijk	35																74					
Peter Thuis	91																				74	
Jellie Tiemersma	182		72																			
Leon Vaessen	163																				72	
Maaike Veeningen	134						73															
Ton Veraart	111																	74				
Robin Verleisdonk	335																			72		
Thierry van Vugt	79																73					
Elene Walgenbach	39														74							
Astrid van de Wetering	48												72									
Eva van Wijngaarden	360																		72			
Sanne de Wilde	102						72															
Ilse Zaal	197												73									

== 5: GroenLinks ==
Candidate list for the GroenLinks
Position	Candidate	Votes	Result
1	Jesse Klaver	227,982	Elected
2	Corinne de Jonge van Ellemeet	70,978	Elected
3	Tom van der Lee	3,173	Elected
4	Laura Bromet	23,666	Elected
5	Senna Maatoug	19,392	Elected
6	Bart Snels	2,969	Elected
7	Suzanne Kröger	9,655	Replacement
8	Paul Smeulders	1,454	
9	Kauthar Bouchallikh	27,038	Elected
10	Lisa Westerveld	33,172	Elected
11	April Ranshuijsen	11,359	
12	Niels van den Berge	1,409	
13	Andrew Harijgens	4,146	
14	Laura Vissenberg	15,019	
15	Geert Gabriëls	3,454	
16	Daniëlle Hirsch	6,981	
17	Nevin Özütok	10,807	
18	Stephanie Bennett	16,712	
19	Noortje Thijssen	3,017	
20	Jeroen Postma	1,107	
21	Simion Blom	1,918	
22	Tom van den Nieuwenhuijzen	1,394	
23	Raja Alouani	4,416	
24	Serpil Ateş	4,310	
25	Hagar Roijackers	1,310	
26	Mark Brakel	945	
27	Dorrit de Jong	479	
28	Samir Toub	1,037	
29	Astrid Janssen	2,021	
30	Imran Hyder	343	
31	Hilde Niezen	1,047	
32	Pepijn Zwanenberg	959	
33	Romano Boshove	459	
34	Milka Yemane	7,991	
35	Martine Doppen	2,089	
36	Melody Deldjou Fard	2,412	
37	Colin Kok	484	
38	Jaswina Elahi	1,264	
39	Tara Scally	783	
40	Mohamed Amessas	203	
41	Leoni Jansen	387	
42	Nienke Homan	1,375	
43	Ufuk Kahya	447	
44	Anouk Gielen	385	
45	Wim-Jan Renkema	295	
46	Kim Schmitz	1,912	
47	Tofik Dibi	268	
48	Glimina Chakor	654	
49	Eric Corton	708	
50	Bram van Ojik	1,523	
Total		537,308	

== 6: Socialist Party ==
Candidate list for the Socialist Party
Position	Candidate	Votes	Result
1	Lilian Marijnissen	416,690	Elected
2	Renske Leijten	143,924	Elected
3	Mahir Alkaya	4,470	Elected
4	Michiel van Nispen	2,264	Elected
5	Maarten Hijink	1,489	Elected
6	Sandra Beckerman	11,049	Elected
7	Peter Kwint	3,252	Elected
8	Bart van Kent	599	Elected
9	Jasper van Dijk	1,338	Elected
10	Jimmy Dijk	1,757	Replacement
11	Sunita Biharie	5,953	
12	Hanne Drost	1,867	
13	Nicole Temmink	2,370	Replacement
14	Murat Memiş	1,364	
15	Sarah Dobbe	1,810	
16	Hans Boerwinkel	851	
17	Fenna Feenstra	1,922	
18	Nina de Ridder	1,157	
19	Frank Futselaar	457	Replacement
20	Bert Peterse	562	
21	Martijn Stoutjesdijk	245	
22	Tiers Bakker	199	
23	Jordy Clemens	1,725	
24	Sara Murawski	889	
25	Gerrie Elfrink	223	
26	Arnout Hoekstra	306	
27	Michel Verschuren	214	
28	Lieke van Rossum	607	
29	Lies van Aelst	353	
30	Bram Roovers	297	
31	Marloes Piepers	745	
32	Erik Flentge	66	
33	Hans van Hooft	184	
34	Eric van den Broek	247	
35	Iris van de Kolk	352	
36	Sebastiaan van den Hout	60	
37	Thomas van Halm	145	
38	David de Vreede	279	
39	Arda Gerkens	126	
40	Spencer Zeegers	232	
41-48	Regional candidates		

=== Socialist Party: Regional candidates ===
Regional candidates for Socialist Party
Candidate	Votes	Result	Position on identical lists in electoral districts				
Candidate	Votes	Result	1	2	3	4	5
Remine Alberts	77				41		
Lesley Arp	82					42	
Iván Beij	87					44	
Annet Belt	168			41			
Robert Bos	94		44				
Mathijs ten Broeke	203			47			
Jan Broekema	330		42				
Taylan Cicek	154					43	
Theo Coşkun	76					47	
Annelies Futselaar	513		45				
Roos van Gelderen	213					41	
Anja Goossens	277						41
Nico Heijmans	89						42
Henk Hensen	127		46				
Mariska ten Heuw	545		48				
Wim Hoogervorst	134				42		
Laurens Ivens	52				48		
Paulus Jansen	50			48			
Dennis de Jong	119					46	
Ruud Kuin	17				47		
Heidi Lascaris-Bouhlel	130				44		
Marianne de Leeuw	344						43
Anne-Marie Mineur	127			46			
Petra Molenaar	163			44			
Willeke van Ooijen	109			42			
Gonnie Oosterbaan	129			43			
Remi Poppe	94					48	
Lenny Roelofs	159					45	
Angelique Schoonewille	307		41				
Denise van Sluijs	133			45			
Eric Smaling	29				46		
Cynthia Smeets	1,045						45
Sem Stroosnijder	132						48
Henri Swinkels	108						44
Lian Veenstra	223		47				
Alexander Vervoort	279						46
Ramon Vos	470		43				
Erik de Vries	244						47
Jakob Wedemeijer	33				45		
Sibel Özen-Özoğul	192				43		

== 7: Labour Party ==
Candidate list for the Labour Party
Position	Candidate	Votes	Result
1	Lilianne Ploumen	401,880	Elected
2	Khadija Arib	52,493	Elected
3	Henk Nijboer	23,512	Elected
4	Attje Kuiken	19,543	Elected
5	Kati Piri	6,330	Elected
6	Joris Thijssen	2,666	Elected
7	Barbara Kathmann	4,780	Elected
8	Gijs van Dijk	2,053	Elected
9	Habtamu de Hoop	10,092	Elected
10	Songül Mutluer	4,896	Replacement
11	Mohammed Mohandis	1,420	Replacement
12	Kirsten van den Hul	4,533	
13	Julian Bushoff	2,811	Replacement
14	Kavish Bisseswar	2,824	
15	Charlotte Brand	6,549	
16	Sofyan Mbarki	1,643	
17	Mikal Tseggai	4,841	
18	Bart van Bruggen	924	
19	Christa Oosterbaan	3,061	
20	Barbara Oomen	6,757	
21	Inge Oosting	2,649	
22	Jasper Kuntzelaers	1,621	
23	Mirthe Biemans	1,311	
24	Matthijs van Neerbos	556	
25	Alptekin Akdogan	901	
26	Attiya Gamri	1,428	
27	Iris Vrolijks	1,707	
28	Abassin Nessar	1,274	
29	Maarten van den Bos	453	
30	Fatihya Abdi	1,493	
31	Stan Peters	690	
32	Lenna Vromans	783	
33	Rebekka Tselms	344	
34	Marcelle Buitendam	257	
35	Loes Ypma	520	
36	Jerzy Soetekouw	890	
37	Bas Bijlsma	211	
38	Marieke van Duijn	480	
39	Joke de Kock	468	
40	Yasin Torunoglu	621	
41	Aya Selman	1,140	
42	Marc Newsome	274	
43	Yara Hümmels	1,519	
44	Marco Eestermans	196	
45	Peter Zwiers	671	
46	Michiel Emmelkamp	111	
47	Amma Asante	739	

=== Labour Party: Regional candidates ===
Regional candidates for Labour Party
Candidate	Votes	Result	Position per electoral district																			
Candidate	Votes	Result	1	2	3	4	5	6	7	8	9	10	11	12	13	14	15	16	17	18	19	20
Adam Ahajaj	69																		48			
Samir Ahraui	29													48								
Dania Al-Obaidi	40						49															
Hedy d'Ancona	266										50	49										49
Rosalie Bedijn	134																49					
Stefan Brau	133												50									
Laura Broekhuizen	459		49																			
Tjeerd van Dekken	193		48																			
Arjen van Drunen	86																		50			
Sjoerd Feitsma	386			48																		
Manon Fokke	466																				49	
Carolien Gehrels	53										48											
Stella van Gent	346			50																		
Roelie Goettsch	275				48																	
Sultan Günal-Gezer	106																			48		
Sophie Heesen	66																48					
Julie d’ Hondt	88									48												
Willem de Jager	66						48															
Anne Janssen	170								49													
Abdelhaq Jermoumi	93																50					
Hamit Karakus	139														50							
Peter Kerris	143							50	50													
Antoinette Knoet	103																			49		
Drees Kroes	309					50																
Steven Lammering	83														48							
John Leerdam	12																					48
Merle van Leusden-Brüning	642																				48	
Chris Maas	41																	49				
Marit Maij	23													49								
Eefke Meijerink	499					49																
Erik van Merrienboer	239																			50		
Bea Mieris	296																		49			
Richard Moti	370														49							
Rob van Muilekom	107									49												
Marinka Mulder	182							48	48													
Jeltje van Nieuwenhoven	123													50								
Houkje Rijpstra	408			49																		
Janny Roggen	222				50																	
Reshma Roopram	160															49						
Bé Schollema	550		50																			
Theo Schouten	271					48																
Jan Smeets	365																				50	
Hans Spekman	288									50												
Wouter Struijk	287															50						
Elvira Sweet	100										49											
Mark Tuit	119				49																	
Xander den Uyl	113											48										
Rien van der Velde	64						50															
Paul Verbruggen	162												49									
Kees Verburg	53																	50				
Laszlo van de Voorde	95																	48				
Peter de Vrij	99												48									
Rita Weeda	17							49														
Hayri Yildiz	69															48						

== 8: Christian Union ==
Candidate list for the Christian Union
Position	Candidate	Votes	Result
1	Gert-Jan Segers	238,225	Elected
2	Carola Schouten	47,008	Elected
3	Mirjam Bikker	8,519	Elected
4	Don Ceder	10,318	Elected
5	Pieter Grinwis	1,240	Elected
6	Stieneke van der Graaf	11,497	Replacement
7	Eppo Bruins	4,261	
8	Nico Drost	1,080	Replacement
9	Hermen Vreugdenhil	889	
10	Dirjanne van Drongelen	3,834	
11	Frank Visser	545	
12	Simone Kennedy-Doornbos	1,600	
13	Bert Tijhof	1,112	
14	Bina Chirino	4,573	
15	Johanna Koffeman-Kramer	987	
16	Gerdien Rots	1,445	
17	Alwin te Rietstap	929	
18	Efraïm Hart	718	
19	Carlijn Niesink	1,183	
20	Gert Jan Bent	348	
21	Elly van Wageningen	476	
22	Jan Henk Verburg	446	
23	Marijke Heuvelink	380	
24	Tobias Holtman	353	
25	Inge Jongman-Mollema	479	
26	Francis van der Mooren	403	
27	Andries Bouwman	422	
28	Marieke Visser	365	
29	Anil Kumar	235	
30	Arend Palland	302	
31	Hadassa Meijer-IJtsma	540	
32	Thomas van Arnhem	379	
33	Maroeska Veldkamp-Magré	377	
34	Sander Huisman	180	
35	Ben Bloem	312	
36	Tirtsa Kamstra-van Dam	170	
37	Thera de Haan-de Jong	295	
38	Lubbert van den Heuvel	169	
39	Esther Kaper-Hartenberg	289	
40	Marco Vermin	107	
41	Daphne Steenbergen	180	
42	Cees Paas	127	
43	Nathalie Nede	294	
44	Henk Willem van Dorp	124	
45	Frans Blok	68	
46	Anne Westerduin-de Jong	252	
47	Els van Dijk	681	
48	Jurjen de Groot	54	
49	Mirjam Kollenstaart	600	
50	Henk Stoorvogel	1,905	

== 9: Party for the Animals ==
Candidate list for the Party for the Animals
Position	Candidate	Votes	Result
1	Esther Ouwehand	282,525	Elected
2	Christine Teunissen	15,323	Elected
3	Leonie Vestering	6,992	Elected
4	Frank Wassenberg	7,128	Elected
5	Lammert van Raan	3,464	Elected
6	Eva van Esch	14,744	Elected
7	Eva Akerboom	10,103	Replacement
8	Pascale Plusquin	5,838	
9	Maarten van Heuven	1,095	
10	Johnas van Lammeren	1,552	
11	Marco van der Wel	811	
12	Ines Kostić	10,013	
13	Luuk van der Veer	1,193	
14	Carla van Viegen	1,411	
15	Kirsten de Wrede	4,567	
16	Falco van Hassel	795	
17	Leo de Groot	1,005	
18	Jaap Hollebeek	368	
19	Robert Barker	285	
20	Anjo Travaille	318	
21	Jaap Rozema	1,263	
22	Cynthia Pallandt	2,048	
23	Leonie Gerritsen	847	
24	Anne-Miep Vlasveld	1,452	
25	Trees Janssens	908	
26	Suzanne Onderdelinden	929	
27	Janine Visser	1,280	
28	Lester van der Pluijm	275	
29	Caroline de Groot	1,044	
30	Bart Kuijer	447	
31	Siska Peeks	851	
32	Marjolijn Veenstra	591	
33	Lianne Raat	453	
34	Wesley Pechler	526	
35	Luuk Folkerts	385	
36	Mensje van der Steen	320	
37	Maryam Hassouni	2,811	
38	Eva Meijer	532	
39	Bibi Dumon Tak	462	
40	Miryanna Boom	432	
41	Babette van Veen	1,265	
42	Chatilla van Grinsven	727	
43	Naphassa Parinussa	1,057	
44	Klaas Knooihuizen	99	
45	Barbara Stok	870	
46	Guus Kuijer	450	
47	Anoek Nuijens	250	
48	Lisa Stel	711	
49	Anton Corbijn van Willenswaard	529	
50	Marianne Thieme	6,406	

== 10: 50PLUS ==
Candidate list for 50PLUS
Position	Candidate	Votes	Result
1	Liane den Haan	80,533	Elected
2	Raymond Brood	2,581	
3	Ellen Verkoelen	4,890	
4	Martin Nijkamp	678	
5	Henk van Tilborg	1,446	
6	Jaap Haasnoot	562	
7	Marc van Rooij	722	
8	Ruud van Acquoij	707	
9	Ron van Reenen	305	
10	Noëlle Sanders	1,825	
11	Alfons Leerkes	138	
12	Linda Verschuur-Otter	1,451	
13	Jan Frans Brouwers	293	
14	Geert Tomlow	255	
15	Willem Willemse	455	
16	Ton Lammertink	238	
17	Adriana Hernández	664	
18	Bennie van Est	1,485	
19	Hans Bongers	286	
20	John van Engelen	209	
21	Johan Hessing	195	
22	Nicoline Maarschalk Meijer	621	
23	Hans Vlak	178	
24	Hylke ten Cate	171	
25	Nico de Vos	270	
26	Leendert Lodder	128	
27	Chris Veeze	501	
28	Theo Hoppenbrouwers	297	
29	Frans Mol	235	
30	Joep Taks	216	
31	Peter van Lier	164	
32	Herman Nota	209	
33	Gerard Timmerman	212	
34	Frans Crouwel	117	
35	Ad Franse	113	
36	Coen Verboom	151	
37	Willem Dekker	140	
38	Jan-Willem van Es	86	
39	Gijs Schuurman	325	
40	Léonie Sazias	2,650	

== 11: Reformed Political Party ==
Candidate list for the Reformed Political Party
Position	Candidate	Votes	Result
1	Kees van der Staaij	193,605	Elected
2	Chris Stoffer	4,690	Elected
3	Roelof Bisschop	4,263	Elected
4	André Flach	1,834	
5	Diederik van Dijk	722	
6	Wouter van den Berg	414	
7	Geert Schipaanboord	359	
8	Johnny Lukasse	488	
9	Jan Kloosterman	325	
10	Nathanaël Middelkoop	1,440	
11	Arie Rijneveld	1,180	
12	Maarten Slingerland	235	
13	Wim van Duijn	438	
14	Dick Both	151	
15	Harry van der Maas	146	
16	Hans Tanis	163	
17	Ewart Bosma	585	
18	Joost Veldman	123	
19	Marco Oosterwijk	279	
20	Leendert de Knegt	282	
21	Gert van Leeuwen	198	
22	Tom Bakker	188	
23	Wim Kok	359	
24	Steven van Westreenen	401	
25	Peter Noordergraaf	128	
26	Ad Dorst	102	
27	Ardjan Boersma	110	
28	Jan Kuijers	327	
29	Henk van der Wind	738	
30	Rick van der Waerdt	179	
31	Henk Bulten	127	
32	Arnold Versteeg	418	
33	Lambert Kisteman	120	
34	Arnoud Proos	350	

== 12: Denk ==
Candidate list for Denk
Position	Candidate	Votes	Result
1	Farid Azarkan	107,212	Elected
2	Tunahan Kuzu	70,374	Elected
3	Stephan van Baarle	2,449	Elected
4	Natasha Mohamed-Hoesein	3,826	
5	Charifa Zemouri	3,082	
6	Isaura Carrilho	5,839	
7	Ahmet Erdoğan	4,600	
8	Nur Icar	3,333	
9	Enes Sariakçe	639	
10	Gürcü Polat-Işıktaş	1,816	
11	Mandy Heikamp-El Khoulati	306	
12	Doğukan Ergin	1,577	
13	Ahmet Kaya	2,378	
14	Ibrahim Ghazi	868	
15	Paulina Smit	319	
16	Arief Khedoe	300	
17	Dennis Belfor	705	
18	Omar El Boussaïdi	339	
19	Marcel Everduim	110	
20	Taha Çoban	412	
21	Ahmed El Hadioui	753	

== 13: Forum for Democracy ==
Candidate list for Forum for Democracy
Position	Candidate	Votes	Result
1	Thierry Baudet	245,323	Elected
2	Wybren van Haga	241,193	Elected
3	Olaf Ephraim	989	Elected
4	Hans Smolders	5,344	Elected
5	Simone Kerseboom	7,025	Elected
6	Gideon van Meijeren	602	Elected
7	Frederik Jansen	4,331	Elected
8	Pepijn van Houwelingen	430	Elected
9	Ralf Dekker	536	Replacement
10	Joyce Vastenhouw	956	
11	Arjan de Kok	3,316	
12	Dennis Boom	398	
13	Joris van den Oetelaar	897	
14	Anton de Lange	284	
15	Samuel Jong	206	
16	Silvio de Groot	175	
17	Andreas Bakir	745	
18	Daniël Osseweijer	561	
19	Carola Dieudonné	1,525	
20	Martin Bos	335	
21	Erwin Jousma	375	
22	Nynke Koopmans-van der Veen	2,121	
23	Yanick Chevalier	215	
24	Robin de Keijzer	319	
25	Lex Cornelissen	375	
26	Bart van der Werf	242	
27	Sam van der Pol	222	
28	Tom Rotmans	278	
29	Hendrikus Velzing	391	
30	Melina van der Velden	241	
31	Ab Kuijer	63	
32	Harm van Essen	94	
33	Fred Walravens	114	
34	Carlos Klazinga	209	
35	Ruby Driessen	232	
36	Wouter Verbraak	132	
37	Floris van der Knoop	45	
38	Johnny Bos	162	
39	Geert Jeelof	98	
40	Johan Talsma	910	
41	Jasper van der Voort	146	
42	Johan Dessing	84	
43	Peter Vermaas	79	
44	Pieter Mink	58	
45	Peter Verstegen	154	
46	Gert Jan Mulder	37	
47	Hans Hugenholtz	58	
48	Robert Jan Staartjes	87	
49	Anton van Schijndel	62	
50	Paul Frentrop	309	

== 14: BIJ1 ==
Candidate list for BIJ1
Position	Candidate	Votes	Result
1	Sylvana Simons	58,068	Elected
2	Quinsy Gario	2,409	
3	Rebekka Timmer	8,993	
4	Jeanette Chedda	4,457	
5	Daryll Landbrug	664	
6	Michantely de Jong	4,224	
7	Lennon Fokkens	295	
8	Nihâl Altmiş	1,356	
9	Yvette Luhrs	729	
10	Petra Kramer	734	
11	Yuval Gal	100	
12	Bart Mijland	185	
13	Lysanne Charles	640	
14	Miko Carels	249	
15	Vayhishta Miskin	452	
16	Gloria Wekker	2,142	
17	Anousha Nzume	451	
18	Romana Vrede	1,090	

== 15: JA21 ==
Candidate list for JA21
Position	Candidate	Votes	Result
1	Joost Eerdmans	197,637	Elected
2	Nicki Pouw-Verweij	16,302	Elected
3	Derk Jan Eppink	2,966	Elected
4	Maarten Goudzwaard	1,380	Replacement
5	Stefan Berlijn	509	
6	Leon Baten	782	
7	Jan Cees Vogelaar	5,261	
8	Yael Potjer	398	
9	Michiel Hoogeveen	337	
10	Maryam Soltani	1,278	
11	Willem Rutjens	803	
12	Esther van Schaik	2,079	
13	Matthijs Sandmann	118	
14	Thomas Blinde	451	
15	Eelco van Hoecke	413	
16	Mieke Andriese	209	
17	Ruud Burlet	904	
18	Johan Almekinders	760	
19	Gert-Jan Ransijn	132	
20	Wouter Weijers	114	
21	Swier Copinga	519	
22	Elly Mulder	359	
23	Ronald Zoutendijk	73	
24	Simon Ceulemans	55	
25	Loek van Wely	301	
26	Roy Blijlevens	414	
27	Xander Eversdijk	194	
28	Rob Roos	222	
29	Ronald Sörensen	254	
30	Annabel Nanninga	11,396	

== 16: Code Orange ==
Candidate list for Code Oranje
Position	Candidate	Votes	Result
1	Richard de Mos	24,002	
2	Peter Plasman	2,321	
3	Tanya Hoogwerf	3,952	
4	Ruud Koornstra	485	
5-50	Regional candidates		
Total			

=== Code Orange: Regional candidates ===
Regional candidates for Code Oranje
Candidate	Votes	Result	Position per electoral district																			
Candidate	Votes	Result	1	2	3	4	5	6	7	8	9	10	11	12	13	14	15	16	17	18	19	20
Petra Ackermans	217		22	16	15	15	12	11	11	18	28	18	39					44	39		23	26
Martine de Bas	51								48					33	24	16		33		47		
Bas Berkhof	29														49	47	46					
Frans Biemans	35							18											15	14	12	
Bert Blase	140		50	50	50	50	50	50	50	50	50	50	50	50	47	50	48	50	49	49	49	50
Richard van den Bovenkamp	118		14	14	14	11	15	14	14	26	44	28	27	32	30	30	37	41	42	45	29	25
Arja Brink	127		26	26	25	26	17	30		15	13	13	12	37	32	36	34		47	29	44	34
Vanessa Bruin	150		32	32	31	34	36	36	39	34	25	30	28	16	11	26	15	16	28	30	30	15
Martijn van Butselaar	209		17	15	16	16	20	7	7	17	16	20	19	28	25	29	27	17	21	22	13	13
Sebas Diekstra	544		8	7	8	8	8	8	8	8	8	7	8	8	8	8	5	8	8	8	8	8
Laurens van Doorn	35		24	24	23	24	26	27	23	21	23	24	22	25	14	24	25	22	23	27	18	20
Bart van Drunen	10													47	13	23						
Jeffrey van der Elst	43		44	39	39		43		49	33	34	39	37		22	17	12	34	35	41		
Rabella de Faria	37												49									11
Femke Flietstra	353		19	20	18	20	23	25	19	19	17	17	13	29	26	31	29	18	22	25	19	17
Jolanda Gaal	110		49	48	48	49	45	48	45	31	40			18	36	18	14	48	34		38	43
Lorraine Groeneveld	115													12		27	20					40
Sylvia Hamerslag	217		16	17	22	25	28	28	30	29	12	14	11	36	33	37	32	49	46		46	28
Raymond van Haren	28		47	34	34	36	38	38	42	37	27	32	30	23	18	13	22	26	30		35	42
Ans Hartnagel	56														50	48	50					
Josette Hogewoning	91		33	33	32	35	37	37	40	36	26	31	29	19	15	11	18	24	29	34	34	41
Ingeborg Hoogveld	852		6	6	6	5	6	6	6	6	7	8	7	5	5	5	6	6	6	6	6	6
John Janson	39		36	38	38	42	42	43	38	32	33	38	36	20	16	15	11	32	19	24	36	37
Gerrit de Jonge	150		13	13	13	12	14	13	13	24	43	27	26	44	45	44	44	40	41	44	28	
Sander Jonker	68		25	25	24	18	11	16	27	11	24	25	24	31	29	34	31	29	25	28	22	24
Hemmie Kerklingh	39		41	49	49	29	16	32	33	14	11	12	17	34	31		35	46	38	33	42	27
Hans-Peter Klazenga	32		48	43	41	41	31	42	36	39	35	35	34	15	37	20	13	31	36	39	39	38
Ruud Kleefman	36		40	42	43	45	47	46		46	39	42	47		39			11	27			45
Harry Kleinen	59		45	44	44	46		49	29	44	45		48	40				12	11	18	26	47
Mieke de Kok	111																			15		
John van Kooten	273																				7	
Pim Kraan	93		39	41	42	44	46	45	47	45	38	41	46	48	38	38		7	26	42		44
Theo Kwakman	79		27	27	26	27	22	31	32	27	14	16	14					47				
Jack van Limpt	26																			16		
Rien Luijkx	108		30	30	29	32	33	20	25	41	49	46	41	42	44	42	41	36	16	13	16	33
Ward Meijroos	134		37	37	37	40	41	41	37	16	32	37	35	14	19	19	8	30		38	37	
Jelle Meinesz	72													11								
Dries Mosch	21														9							
Hilbrand Nawijn	38																49					
Tineke Nieboer	212		11	8	7	13	18	23	15		41	48	44	45	46	45	45	42	43	46	47	23
Wim van Overveld	79		42	45	45	47	48	47	28	43	46	44	43	39	40	40	38	13	7	17	24	30
Robert Pestman	395		7	9	11	14	19	24	16	49	37	49	45			46	43	43	44	48	48	22
Dre Rennenberg	99																		50	50	50	
Martijn Rieter	160		23	23	19	21	25	19	22	22	20	23	23	30	28	32	30	20	14	11	14	19
Jordy Schaap	95		43		33	39	30	33	35	48	15	11	16				26				40	39
Eddy Silva	105			35	35	37	39	39	41	35	31	33	31	24	20	14	24	27	31	35	33	7
Ralf Sluijs	116		34	46	46	48	49	34	46	30	29	34	32	10	35	25	16	28	32	37	41	48
Wil van Soest	211		31	31	30	33	35	35	34	12	6	6	6	35	34	33	36	38	37	31	43	12
Jan van der Starre	85		46	47	47	28	29	29	31	28	18	15	15	38				45	45	32	45	35
Peter van Steensel	89		29	29	28	31	34	22	26	42	48	47	42	43	43	43	42	37	17	12	15	32
Peter Stehouwer	58											43		46		39	40	14	12	19	25	31
John Struijlaard	24		18	19		19	27		18	23	19	19	18	17	12	22	17	15	20	20	17	14
Hannie Stuurman	299		9	11	9	9	9	9	9	9	9	9	9	9	7	9	9	9	9	9	9	9
Johan Stuut	189		12	12	12	7	13	12	12	25	42	26	25	27	41	35	33	39	40	43	27	16
Ronald Tol	15													49	48	49	47		48			49
Peter van der Velden	74		35	36	36	38	40	40	43	38	30	36	33	22	17	12	19	25		36	32	46
Cor Verbeek	252		28	28	27	30	32	17	24	40	47	45	40	41	42	41	39	35	13	7	11	29
Joan Versantvoort	31																			40		
Mick de Vlieger	1,695		5	5	5	6	5	5	5	5	5	5	5	6	6	6	7	5	5	5	5	5
Harry Wagemakers	61		38	40	40	43	44	44	44	47	36	40	38	26	23	7	23	23	18	23	31	36
Koert Westerman	346		21	21	21	22	21	21	21	7	21	21	21	21	21	21	21	21	33	21	21	21
Rogier van Wijk	93		15	18	17	17	7	15	17	13		29										
Damiën Zeller	88		20	22	20	23	24	26	20	20	22	22	20	13	27	28	28	19	24	26	20	18
Öner Çatalpinar	155		10	10	10	10	10	10	10	10	10	10	10	7	10	10	10	10	10	10	10	10

== 17: Volt Netherlands ==
Candidate list for the Volt Netherlands
Position	Candidate	Votes	Result
1	Laurens Dassen	135,272	Elected
2	Nilüfer Gündoğan	41,352	Elected
3	Ernst Boutkan	2,783	Replacement
4	Marieke Koekkoek	37,093	Elected
5	Martin Gravelotte	763	
6	Bibi Wielinga	6,242	
7	Floris Eigenhuis	2,044	
8	Ilca Italianer	4,286	
9	Fons Janssen	1,398	
10	Sylvia van Laar	2,503	
11	Itay Garmy	948	
12	Marleen Ramaker	3,650	
13	Joris van Oppenraaij	625	
14	Sandra Griffejoen	754	
15	Jeroen van Iterson	1,134	
16	Sarah de Koff	2,590	
17	Frank Toeset	1,040	
18	Michelle van Zanten	567	
19	Thomas van der Meer	1,797	
20	Sacha ten Hove	1,449	
21	Friso Datema	370	
22	Ger van Eeden	145	
23	Jeroen Koendjbiharie	671	
24	Robine van Eck	303	
25	Theo Doreleijers	346	
26	Elske Kroesen	371	
27	Katya Lenskaya	685	
28	Reinier van Lanschot	1,299	

== 18: NIDA ==
Candidate list for NIDA
Position	Candidate	Votes	Result
1	Nourdin El Ouali	16,565	
2	Elsa van de Loo	7,750	
3	Nurullah Gerdan	416	
4	Fatima Aboulouafa	946	
5	Elvin Rigters	105	
6	Jacqueline Echtermeijer	156	
7	Mohamed Abdulahi	3,112	
8	Sanaa Abarghaze	204	
9	Adeel Mahmood	877	
10	Nancy Rijssel	116	
11	Mounir Kasmi	258	
12	Sobana Sheikh Rashid	356	
13	Almira Henić	261	
14	Assamau’al Saidi Rabah	152	
15	Asma Halusi	206	
16	Alihan Uzun	186	
17	Layla Klioual	73	
18	Emre Şahin	240	
19	Youssra Ebnolfaqih	116	
20	Önder Duran	52	
21	Mohammed Akkari	182	
22	Hassan Buyatui	172	
23	Aytaç Alpdoğu	121	
24	Michał Hajkowski	16	
25	Stephan Kuipers	59	
26	Leyla Cakir	180	
27	Fariz Akkouh	74	
28	Marinah Butt	365	
29	Bas van Noppen	113	
30	Hasib Moukaddim	165	
31	Halil Karaaslan	240	

== 19: Pirate Party ==
Candidate list for the Pirate Party
Position	Candidate	Votes	Result
1	Matthijs Pontier	14,028	
2	Ji Yong Dijkhuis	954	
3	Saira Sadloe	2,663	
4	David van Deijk	487	
5	Jasmijn Boeken	1,313	
6	Wietze Brandsma	285	
7	Petra Downs-Hovestadt	343	
8	Mark van Treuren	116	
9	Astrid Abendroth	227	
10	Danny Werner	57	
11	André Linnenbank	97	
12	Dmitri Schrama	127	
13	Leontien Wafelman	265	
14	Dylan Hallegraeff	112	
15	Frank Wijnans	54	
16	Tjerk Feitsma	42	
17	Bob Sikkema	84	
18	Edy Bouma	78	
19	Robert Kwakkelstein	235	
20	Thijs Ligthart	89	
21	Peter ter Haak	95	
22	Melchior Philips	134	
23	Dave Borghuis ook genaamd op de Borg	206	
24	Rick Piepers	87	
25	Teunis van Nes	59	
26	Mirjam van Rijn	200	
27	Dirk Poot	102	
28	Metje Blaak	277	

== 20: Libertarian Party ==
Candidate list for the Libertarian Party
Position	Candidate	Votes	Result
1	Robert Valentine	3,338	
2	Jeroen Weber	149	
3	Roos Schoenmakers	557	
4	Arnoud Kuipers	121	
5	Wijnand Groenen	37	
6	Nathan Bouscher	39	
7	Willem Buising	39	
8	Yu Mei O	217	
9	Saskia van Balen	97	
10	Marco Nijweide	32	
11	Willem Cornax	31	
12	Pallieter Koopmans	12	
13	Peter Hartkamp	21	
14	Romy de Man	43	
15	Nicki de Haaij	12	
16	Lola de Grunt	35	
17	Gianni Kalkman	19	
18	Nando Jansen	24	
19	Ria Winkelhorst	23	
20	Rutger Hanssens	37	
21	Tom Huijs	30	
22	Arno Inen	9	
23	Sander Fischer	6	
24	Joeri Jungschlager	36	
25	Quintus Backhuijs	14	
26	Rik Kleinsmit	20	
27	Roald Schoenmakers	16	
28	Jip Meijer	9	
29	Roman van Ree	14	
30	Loes Engels	38	
31	Arno Wellens	471	

== 21: JONG ==
Candidate list for JONG
Position	Candidate	Votes	Result
1	Jaron Tichelaar	9,032	
2	Christinemindel ten Napel	1,654	
3	Andreas Klein	751	
4	Shane Pattipeilohy	253	
5	Amber Cornelissen	858	
6	Benito Walker	315	
7	Feline van der Louw	400	
8	Samir el- Baramawi	159	
9	Dennis Goedhart	236	
10	Kaya van den Dikkenberg	234	
11	Lars Hobma	169	
12	Sophie Brügemann	283	
13	Jasper van Veen	90	
14	Noël Silalahi	69	
15	Elisha Geertsma	147	
16	Jacob de Groot	132	
17	Joyce van Boekel	370	
18	Jan Geelen	145	

== 22: Splinter ==
Candidate list for Splinter
Position	Candidate	Votes	Result
1	Femke Merel van Kooten-Arissen	27,301	
2	Marjan Schnetz	770	
3	Fabian van Hal	403	
4	Giovanni Angiolini Trapanese	103	
5	Ingrid Keyser	262	
6	Shad Raouf	358	
7	Marise Schot	366	
8	Elisabeth van Leeuwen	198	
9	René Jan Veldwijk	127	
10	Magda Łuczycki	100	
11	Mauritius Wijffels	95	
12	Meiny Prins	245	

== 23: Farmer-Citizen Movement ==
Candidate list for the Farmer-Citizen Movement
Position	Candidate	Votes	Result
1	Caroline van der Plas	56,205	Elected
2	Femke Wiersma	25,588	
3	Erik Stegink	4,497	
4	Derk Evert Waalkens	2,324	
5	Wim Jaspers	1,505	
6	Elly van Wijk	840	
7	Robert Veldhuis	533	
8	Ad Baltus	1,383	
9	Jan Brok	962	
10	Monique Flipsen-Verhagen	953	
11	Ad Merks	291	
12	Robin van Lint	371	
13	Dario Prinsen	876	
14	Wilbert van Lanen	527	
15	Ron van Essen	411	
16	Kees Hanse	1,019	
17	Arno Vael	592	
18	Janet Mensink-Smit	1,102	
19	Han van ’t Hof	192	
20	Gert-Jan Minderhoud	197	
21	Jan-Jorch van Dijk	246	
22	Willem van den Elzen	335	
23	Frank Timmermans	1,345	
24	Gert van Dellen	921	
25	Henk Vermeer	364	
26	Wim Groot Koerkamp	740	

== 24: NLBeter ==
Candidate list for the NLBeter
Position	Candidate	Votes	Result
1	Esther van Fenema	6,165	
2	Ton van Haperen	454	
3	Janneke Wittekoek	1,052	
4	Ronald Mann	90	
5	Ingrid Hartog	95	
6	Gerrit Breteler	80	
7	Meindert Bolt	61	
8	Igor Monzón	82	
9	Anneke Tromp	79	
10	Steffie Jansen	187	
11	Fred Schonewille	37	
12	Maurice Leeser	42	
13	Klaas van Veen	95	
14	Elly Koning	138	

== 25: Henk Krol List ==
Candidate list for the Henk Krol List
Position	Candidate	Votes	Result
1	Henk Krol	8,043	
2	Rosa Molenaar	409	
3	Dick van Zanten	79	
4	Arjan van der Hout	50	
5	Manitou Jansen	58	
6	Bert Kannegieter	79	
7	Justiënne de Lange-Wendt	52	
8	Rob Cohen	35	
9	Daan Pruimboom	79	
10	Wilma de Mooij	32	
11	Jan Sikking	27	
12	Bart Schuitenmaker	21	
13	Marco van den Boomgaard	17	
14	Leen van Toor	14	
15	John Geven	43	
16	Ger de Groot	10	
17	Janneke Koning	36	
18	Joop Boonstra	18	
19	Betty Gerber	38	
20	Huub Slangen	26	
21	Monique Kortenoeven	37	
22	Frank Engelman	61	

== 26: OpRecht ==
Candidate list for OpRecht
Position	Candidate	Votes	Result
1	Michael Ruperti	1,983	
2	Dirk Jan Keijser	92	
3	Dannij van der Sluijs	124	
4	José Imlabla	1,538	
5	Robert van den Bout	339	
6	Jan Nieboer	201	
7	Peter van Welij	25	
8	Ferdinand van de Zande	24	
9	Robert Brunke	38	
10	Alexander Stienstra	35	
11	Vinesh Khoenkhoen	179	
12	Nicole Martens	162	
13	Richard Zijlstra	15	
14	Jan Rhebergen	33	
15	Erik Verbrugh	11	
16	Maurice Vissers	571	
17	Robert van Gemeren	79	

== 27: Jezus Leeft ==
Candidate list for Jezus Leeft
Position	Candidate	Votes	Result
1	F.I.A. van der Spek	4,115	
2	J.A.C. van Ooijen	513	
3	M.J. Westhoven	387	

== 28: Proud of the Netherlands ==
Candidate list for the Proud of the Netherlands
Position	Candidate	Votes	Result
1	Sander van den Raadt	7,500	
2	Dana van Kessel	1,790	
3	Jac Amand	106	
4	Sabina Achterbergh	1,166	
5	Henk Smits	436	
6	Sebastiaan Veenstra	420	
7	Lodewijk Koenen	46	
8	Sheila Neijman	283	
9	Johan Rijbroek	43	
10	Luud Klarenbeek	367	
11	Maikel Kat	172	
12	Willem Sikkema	96	
13	Erwin van Oosterom	245	
14	Vera Verhagen	187	
15	Joop Dekker	68	
16	Colinda Cordés	68	
17	Arjan Gelder	205	

== 29: Ubuntu Connected Front ==
Candidate list for the Ubuntu Connected Front
Position	Candidate	Votes	Result
1	R.P. Vaarnold	424	
2	V.E. Sno	169	
3	K.L.L. Cuvalay	141	
4	L.J. Fer	41	
5	B.D. Doesburg	18	
6	H.D. Tjon A Kon	73	
7	C.A. Woodley	234	
8	M.D. Vlet	77	
9	S. Miguel	120	
10	A. Kassa	45	
11	D.G.C. Riedewald	47	
12	P.A.M. Ploeg	13	
13	C.T. Lopes	102	
14	J. Ovunda	32	
15	G.J. Mac Intosch	75	
16	L.O. Igbonugo	35	
17	M.J.D.L.C. Sillé	48	
18	H.V. Mijnals	106	
19	R.A.R. Biekman	80	

== 30: Heart for Freedom ==
Candidate list for Heart for Freedom
Position	Candidate	Votes	Result
1	Anna Zeven	3,993	
2	Willem Engel	2,869	
3	Mordechai Krispijn	539	
4	Koen Verhagen	150	
5	Theo Vos	18	
6	Christian Kromme	18	
7	Paul Brenkman	40	
8	Steven de Oude	42	
9	Ferenc Honkoop	41	
10	Felix Tangelder	18	
11	Omar Tegel	58	
12	Simcha de Haan	52	
13	Inez van Baarsen	53	
14	Melissa de Ruijter	61	
15	Ramona Kwestro	40	
16	Lisa van Archipel	68	
17	Rick Artz	10	
18	Edward Kleinjan	39	
19	Wilko Huiden	12	
20	Ab Gietelink	56	
21	Kees van der Pijl	100	

== 31: Party of Unity ==
Candidate list for the Party of Unity
Position	Candidate	Votes	Result
1	Arnoud van Doorn	617	
2	Zeliha Gundem-Sen	33	
3	Jolisa Brouwer	15	
4	Daniyal Baksh	9	
5	Mejdi Dakhlaoui	33	
6	Judith Kraak	4	
7	Liesbeth Hofman	19	
8	Laila Akka	17	
9	Nancy Reijnhout	21	
10	Sener Aslan	36	

== 32: The Party Party ==
Candidate list for The Party Party
Position	Candidate	Votes	Result
1	Johan Vlemmix	3,744	

== 33: Free and Social Netherlands ==
Candidate list for Free and Social Netherlands
Position	Candidate	Votes	Result
1	Bas Filippini	516	
2	Irene van der Marel	156	
3	Giliam Kuijpers	113	
4	Katie Janssen	49	
5	Theo Vos	13	
6	Christian Kromme	9	
7	Felix Tangelder	11	
8	Norbert Klein	12	
9	Kees van Driel	14	
10	Christian ter Veer	49	

== 34: We are the Netherlands ==
Candidate list for We are the Netherlands
Position	Candidate	Votes	Result
1	Erwin Versteeg	302	
2	Wim Elsthout	22	
3	Georges Scheffer	19	
4	Menno Jas	14	
5	Lesley de Séra	39	
6	Miro Schäfer	19	
7	Daniëlle de Vries	37	
8	Johan Mulder	15	
9	Adriana Gilles	14	
10	Yvette Hensen	72	

== 35: Modern Netherlands ==
Candidate list for Modern Netherlands
Position	Candidate	Votes	Result
1	Niels Heeze	103	
2	Chris Truong	22	
3	Luisa Arcila Arrieta	16	
4	Charlton Labad	20	
5	Wendy Jagai	8	
6	Jerrel van Duyne	15	
7	Brian Golinelli	8	
8	Dheeraj Gayadien	13	
9	Rik Sinnige	2	
10	Senso Rieskin	38	

== 36: The Greens ==
Candidate list for The Greens
Position	Candidate	Votes	Result
1	Otto ter Haar	50	
2	Angela Zikking	28	
3	Johan Lammering	5	
4	Nora Borsboom	2	
5	Christiaan van Utrecht	1	
6	Paul Berendsen	3	
7	Reina van Zwoll	3	
8	Rijndert Doting	3	
9	Adriaan Smeekes	1	
10	Tom Bakkers	6	
11	Sybrand Andringa	1	
12	Luuk Hofman	2	
13	David Blik	2	
14	Vera ter Haar-van Oyen	12	

== 37: Party for the Republic ==
Candidate list for the Party for the Republic
Position	Candidate	Votes	Result
1	Bruno Braakhuis	144	
2	Okke de Lint	6	
3	Jeff de Kleijn	2	
4	René Zwaap	18	
5	Thom Straatsma	15	
6	Siebren Klein	22	
7	Mieke de Graaf	28	
8	Serge van Duijnhoven	2	
9	Ed Heesbeen	2	
10	Paul Damen	2	
11	Rob Muntz	14	

== See also ==
- List of members of the House of Representatives of the Netherlands, 2021–2023

== Source ==
- Kiesraad (16 April 2021). "Proces-verbaal verkiezingsuitslag Tweede Kamerverkiezing 2021" (PDF) (in Dutch).
