= Hülya Kat =

Dutch politician

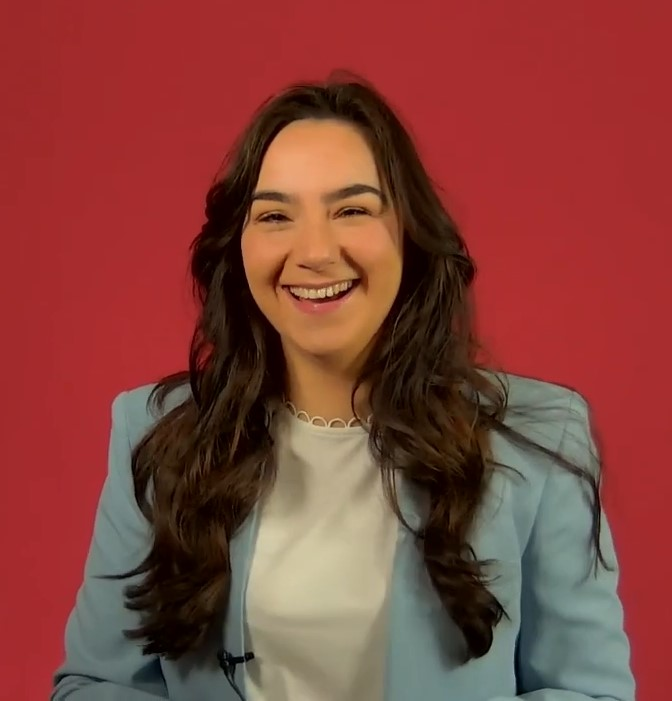

Member of the House of Representatives
- In office 31 March 2021 – 5 December 2023

Member of the Amsterdam municipal council
- In office 30 May 2018 – 31 March 2021
- Preceded by: Mascha ten Bruggencate

Member of the Velsen municipal council
- In office 11 March 2010 – 22 February 2018
- Succeeded by: Bas de Ruig

Personal details
- Born: 1 August 1983 (age 43) IJmuiden, Netherlands
- Party: Democrats 66
- Education: University of Groningen
- Website: hulyakat.nl

Hülya Kat (born 1 August 1983) is a Dutch politician, serving as a member of the House of Representatives on behalf of the social liberal party Democrats 66 (D66). She was a member of the Velsen municipal council between 2010 and 2018, when she was elected to the Amsterdam council. Kat won a seat in the House in the 2021 general election.

== Early life and education ==
Kat was born in 1983 in the North Holland port town of IJmuiden to Turkish-born parents, who had come to the Netherlands in 1970. She grew up in that town and in Santpoort-Noord with her two younger brothers, and she attended the Haarlem secondary school Erasmus College. Kat studied law at the University of Groningen between 2002 and 2009 with intellectual property law as specialization and returned to her parents in IJmuiden afterwards.

== Career ==
She joined Democrats 66 in 2009 and first appeared on the ballot in the 2010 municipal election in Velsen as the party's fifth candidate. D66 won four municipal council seats, but Kat was elected despite this result because of her preference votes. At the time, Kat also volunteered at the Velsen animal ambulance. She became chair of the municipality's John van Dijk Fund, which aims to engage young people in politics, shortly after her election. Kat's focus in the council was on safety and public order, and she was re-elected in 2014 as D66's third candidate. She was also placed 38th on the party list in the 2017 general election. Kat received 2,685 preference votes, but she was not elected due to D66 winning nineteen seats.

She moved to the Dutch capital of Amsterdam in 2018, while she was working as an HR officer at a cleaning company. Kat was D66's ninth candidate in Amsterdam in the 2018 municipal election, which was held a month after she had left the Velsen municipal council. Her party won eight seats in Amsterdam, but Kat did end up in the municipal council in May 2018, when another D66 member left the council. She became her party's spokesperson for economic affairs, port, airport, and spatial planning and the chair of the mobility, air quality, and water committee. She also started working as a senior staff and organizational advisor at the Amsterdam district court in June 2018.

Kat ran again for member of parliament in the 2021 general election, being placed seventeenth on the party list. She received 15,620 preference votes and was sworn into the House of Representatives on 31 March. She was replaced in the Amsterdam municipal council that same day, and she left her job at the district court. In the House, Kat's specializations were poverty, debts, and the childcare benefits scandal, the Participation Act, and law, and she is on the Committees for Credentials, Defence, Finance, Justice and Security (chair), Public Expenditure, and Social Affairs and Employment (vice chair). In October 2021, she also took over Rens Raemakers's position on the committee of the parliamentary inquiry into natural gas extraction Groningen. She was her party's lijstduwer in Amsterdam in the 2022 municipal elections. Following reports in March 2022 about an administrator who had embezzled money from debtors he was managing the finances of, Kat suggested changes to the system. She proposed for municipalities to provide a central point for help in case of high debts, which would create a three-year plan to get out of debt and to prevent a repeat. This is supposed to prevent debts continuing for many years, which could be in the financial interest of the administrator. In late 2022, the House of Representatives passed a motion by Kat to have the government provide free period products to low-income households. Another amendment co-filed by Kat was carried to shorten the term for personal debt restructuring from three to one and a half years.

Kat has been part of the board of directors of UNESCO Centrum Nederland, which provides development aid, since 2012.

== Personal life ==
She moved from Amsterdam to The Hague, while a member of parliament, and she is a supporter of the football club AZ Alkmaar.

== Electoral history ==
Electoral history of Hülya Kat
Year	Body	Party	Pos.	Votes	Result		Ref.
Year	Body	Party	Pos.	Votes	Party seats	Individual	Ref.
2021	House of Representatives	Democrats 66	17	15,620	24	Won	
2023	House of Representatives	Democrats 66	17	1,907	9	Lost	
