= Lisa van Ginneken =

Member of the Dutch House of Representatives

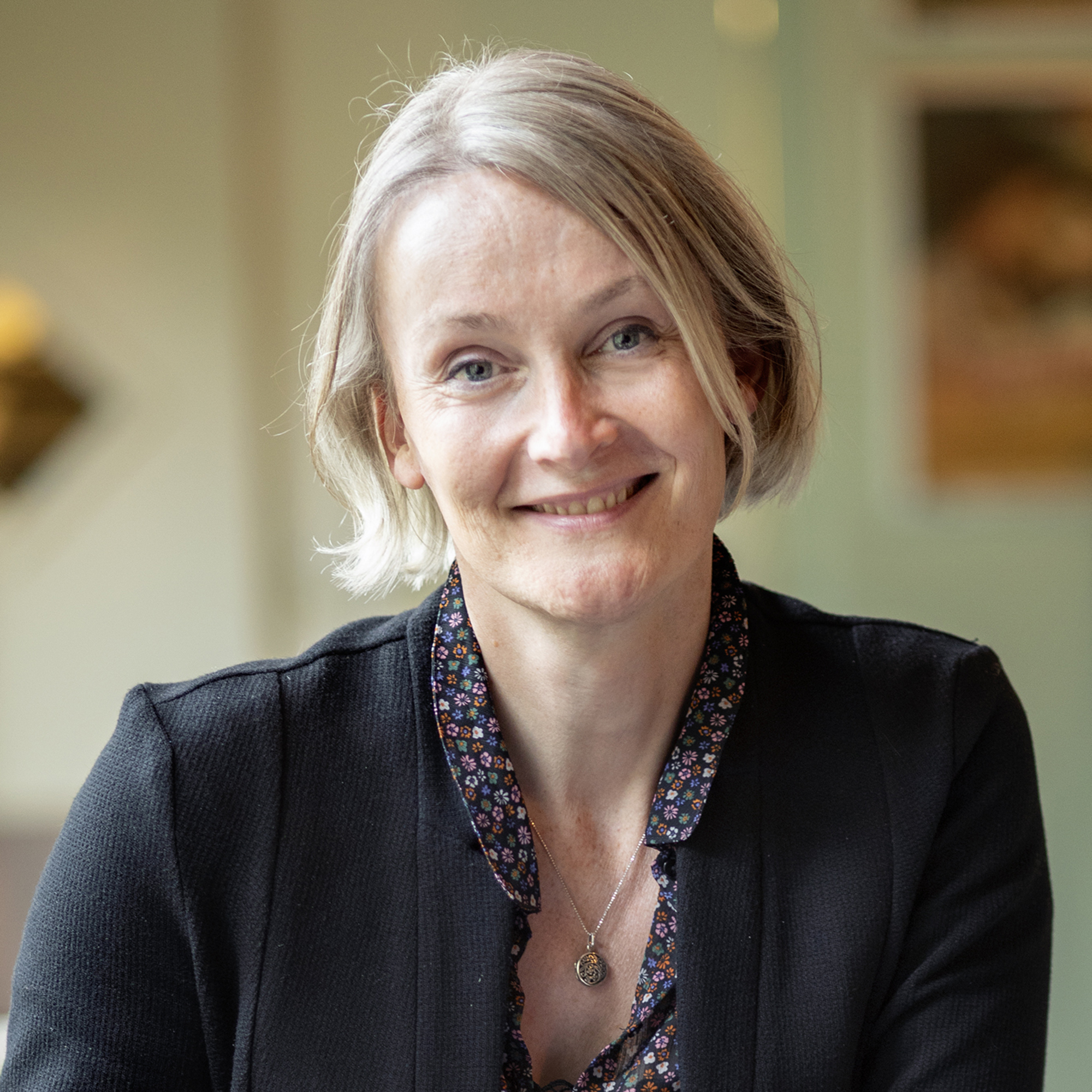
- Van Ginneken in 2019

Member of the House of Representatives
- In office 31 March 2021 – 5 December 2023

Personal details
- Born: June 28, 1972 (age 54) Oosterhout, Netherlands
- Party: Democrats 66
- Children: 1
- Education: West-Brabant University of Applied Sciences
- Website: www.lisavanginneken.nl

Lisa Mianti van Ginneken (pronounced [ˈlisaː vɑŋ ˈɣɪnəkə(n)]; born 28 June 1972) is a Dutch politician of the social liberal party Democrats 66 (D66). She worked as a software developer and later gave organizational trainings. She started serving as chair of the organization Transvisie in 2017. She became a member of parliament after the 2021 general election. Van Ginneken is the first transgender person to be elected into the Dutch House of Representatives, where she is her party's spokesperson for IT, privacy, family law, and mobility.

== Early life and career ==
Van Ginneken was born and raised in Oosterhout, North Brabant with her two older sisters, and her father was an electrician. She attended its secondary school Mgr. Frencken College at havo level for seven years. While a teenager, she developed games for the Commodore 64 to earn some extra money. Between 1991 and 1995, she studied business informatics at the West-Brabant University of Applied Sciences. Van Ginneken started her career as a software developer at TAS Groep and became a manager and consultant at Inter Access Cens in 1997. She subsequently worked for Verdonck Klooster & Associates as a senior consultant in the years 2000–2006. Van Ginneken founded her own business, Grip op ICT, in the latter year, working as a consultant, coach, and trainer. She owned another company, cnxy, where she served as an organizational change manager, coach, and trainer starting in 2014.

In October 2017, Van Ginneken became chair of Transvisie, an advocacy group that represents the interests of transgender persons in the Netherlands, beside her job. She had served there as a coordinator since 2016 and had also been a board member for about half a year. Van Ginneken also became a member of the advisory board of the Netherlands Institute for Human Rights in October 2019.

== Politics ==
In the 2021 Dutch general election, she was elected into the House of Representatives. She was the 22nd candidate on D66's party list and received 10,969 preference votes. Van Ginneken had decided to run for office because of comments by Thierry Baudet, the leader of the conservative and populist party Forum for Democracy, during the campaign for the 2019 provincial elections. She campaigned on giving transgender and intersex people more say in their medical procedures and on limiting the power of technology corporations.

Van Ginneken was sworn into the House on 31 March 2021 as the first transgender member in its history. She simultaneously left Transvisie and the Netherlands Institute for Human Rights. Van Ginneken was D66's spokesperson for ICT, digital government, intelligence agencies, privacy, family law, identity, roads, mobility, railways, and public transport. She is a member of the Committees for Agriculture, Nature and Food Quality; for Digital Affairs; for Economic Affairs and Climate Policy; for Foreign Trade and Development Cooperation; for Infrastructure and Water Management; for the Interior; and for Justice and Security as well as of the Benelux Parliament and the Building Advice Committee, which advises on the renovation of the Binnenhof. In an interview, she argued for investing more in the European technology industry, calling the continent's technological dependency on the United States and China a threat to privacy protection. She filed an amendment to the Transgender Act in late 2021, which would make it possible for non-binary persons to have an "X" in their government ID as their gender designation without the intervention of a judge. The Council of State advised negatively on the amendment for legal reasons, and Van Ginneken subsequently drafted a bill instead. She also defended a revised Transgender Act that was proposed by the fourth Rutte cabinet and that would remove the requirement for a statement by a psychologist or psychiatrist to change one's legal gender. Van Ginneken said that the barrier leaves the impression that transgender people are not able to make this decision by themselves and that its removal would aid in self-development. She discarded worries about men changing their gender to enter women's changing rooms, noting that passports are not checked at the door.

She received the 2021 Pride Award in the category Well-known LGBTI+ Hero. The chair of the jury, Cornald Maas, called the fact that she is the House's first female transgender member "important and historic". Van Ginneken announced in November 2022, that she would leave social media platform Twitter, as healthy debate was being undermined by hateful comments according to her.

== Personal life ==
Van Ginneken is divorced and has a son. She moved to Amsterdam shortly after her divorce and has lived there since. Van Ginneken has also resided in Breda and Zoetermeer. She is transgender, and her transition to a woman started in 2014. She underwent sex reassignment surgery in Thailand in June 2016.

Van Ginneken is an actress and stage manager in amateur theater.

== Electoral history ==
Electoral history of Lisa van Ginneken
Year	Body	Party	Pos.	Votes	Result		Ref.
Year	Body	Party	Pos.	Votes	Party seats	Individual	Ref.
2021	House of Representatives	Democrats 66	22	10,969	24 / 150	Won	
2023	House of Representatives	Democrats 66	12	11,122	9 / 150	Lost	
2026	Amsterdam Municipal Council	Democrats 66	38	98	8 / 45	Lost	
