= Hatte van der Woude =

Dutch politician (born 1969)

Member of the House of Representatives
- Incumbent
- Assumed office 31 March 2021

Alderwoman in Delft
- In office 13 June 2018 – 22 March 2021
- Succeeded by: Lennart Harpe

Municipal councillor of Delft
- In office 27 September 2012 – 10 November 2016
- Preceded by: Leja van der Hoek
- Succeeded by: Dimitri van Rijn

Personal details
- Born: 18 September 1969 (age 57) Haarlem, Netherlands
- Party: People's Party for Freedom and Democracy
- Children: 3
- Education: University of Amsterdam; University of Montpellier
- Occupation: Politician; policy officer; lecturer

Hatta Hannelore "Hatte" van der Woude (born 18 September 1969) is a Dutch politician who has represented the conservative-liberal People's Party for Freedom and Democracy (VVD) in the House of Representatives since 2021. She started her career in Vietnam and Singapore and later worked for The Hague University of Applied Sciences as a researcher, lecturer and policy advisor. Van der Woude was politically active in Delft's municipal council (2012–2016) and as an alderwoman in the city's municipal executive (2018–2021) prior to being elected to the House of Representatives in the 2021 general election.

== Early life and career ==
Van der Woude was born in 1969 in Haarlem. She attended the Gouda secondary school Antonius College at vwo level in the years 1981–88 and subsequently started studying French language and literature at the University of Amsterdam. She moved to France after receiving her propedeuse to study foreign languages at the University of Montpellier. She went back to the University of Amsterdam after another year in 1990 and received a degree in European studies five years later.

Van der Woude started her career as a freelance market research editor and moved to Ho Chi Minh City in Vietnam in 1997 to take a job as research consultant and journalist for a business called Mekong Sources. She became a pre-sales consultant for Exact Software, which is located in Singapore, in 2001. After a year and a half at that company, she returned to the Netherlands and did not hold any positions for some time.

Van der Woude started working as a researcher at The Hague University of Applied Sciences in 2007 and investigated innovation management in small and medium-sized enterprises as well as internationalization. She became a lecturer in the latter field two years later. She stopped teaching in 2011 to serve as an internationalization policy officer at the institution and was promoted to senior policy advisor at its Academy for Masters & Professional Courses in 2014. Van der Woude left the applied sciences university three years later to work for the General Intelligence and Security Service (AIVD) as an analyst. She stepped down from that position upon her appointment as alderwoman in 2018.

== Politics ==
Van der Woude was the VVD's sixth candidate in Delft in the 2010 municipal elections. She was not elected but she did become a committee member of the municipal council with a focus on safety, sustainability, housing, waste management, participation, and youth care. When another councilor stepped down in September 2012, she became a full member of the council, and she served as her party's spokesperson for youth care, sports, education, housing, and safety. Van der Woude was re-elected in 2014 after she had been placed third on the party list. She resigned in late 2016, halfway through her term, because of the combined workload of her job and her council membership.

She became an alderwoman in Delft's new municipal executive, which was formed after the 2018 municipal elections in June, with responsibility over education, youth, and integration. Van der Woude worked on a housing project at the location of a former hospital with about 350 units called Bethelpark and on plans to merge six primary schools in Tanthof into three and to house them in a single building. Two opposition parties threatened to file a motion of no confidence against her and another alderwoman because of concerns by residents about the mergers, and the plans were later abandoned due to their costs. Van der Woude also promoted technical vmbo and mbo education in the municipality, saying that the hometown of Delft University of Technology needed skilled workers, and cooperated with educational institutions to investigate a new such location in Schieoevers. While an alderwoman, Van der Woude was a board member of the Vereniging van Zuid Hollandse Gemeenten (Association of South Holland municipalities).

She ran for member of the House of Representatives in the 2021 general election as the VVD's 32nd candidate. She was elected and received 2,312 preference votes. She was sworn into the House on 31 March and had resigned from her position as alderwoman the week before. Her specialties are higher education, science policy, teacher training and policy, DUO, RCE, Nationaal Archief, and emancipation. She is a member of the Interparliamentary Committee on the Dutch Language Union and of the Committees for Finance and for Education, Culture and Science. In the House, Van der Woude worked with other parties on a bill to ban conversion therapy, and she successfully called for a risk analysis of foreign interference in higher education and science by countries such as China, Iran, and Russia. Furthermore, she was critical of the increasing number of international students at Dutch universities and proposed to allow these institutions to limit their number to prevent uncontrolled internationalization.

== Personal life ==
Van der Woude is married, has two daughters and one son, and resides in Delft. Sea sailing is one of her hobbies.

== Electoral history ==
Electoral history of Hatte van der Woude
Year	Body	Party	Pos.	Votes	Result		Ref.
Year	Body	Party	Pos.	Votes	Party seats	Individual	Ref.
2021	House of Representatives	People's Party for Freedom and Democracy	32	2,312	34 / 150	Won	
2022	Delft Municipal Council	People's Party for Freedom and Democracy	39 (Note: Van der Woude participated as a lijstduwer.)	20	3 / 39	Lost	
2026	Delft Municipal Council	People's Party for Freedom and Democracy	33	7	3 / 39	Lost	
