= Peter de Groot =

Member of the Dutch House of Representatives

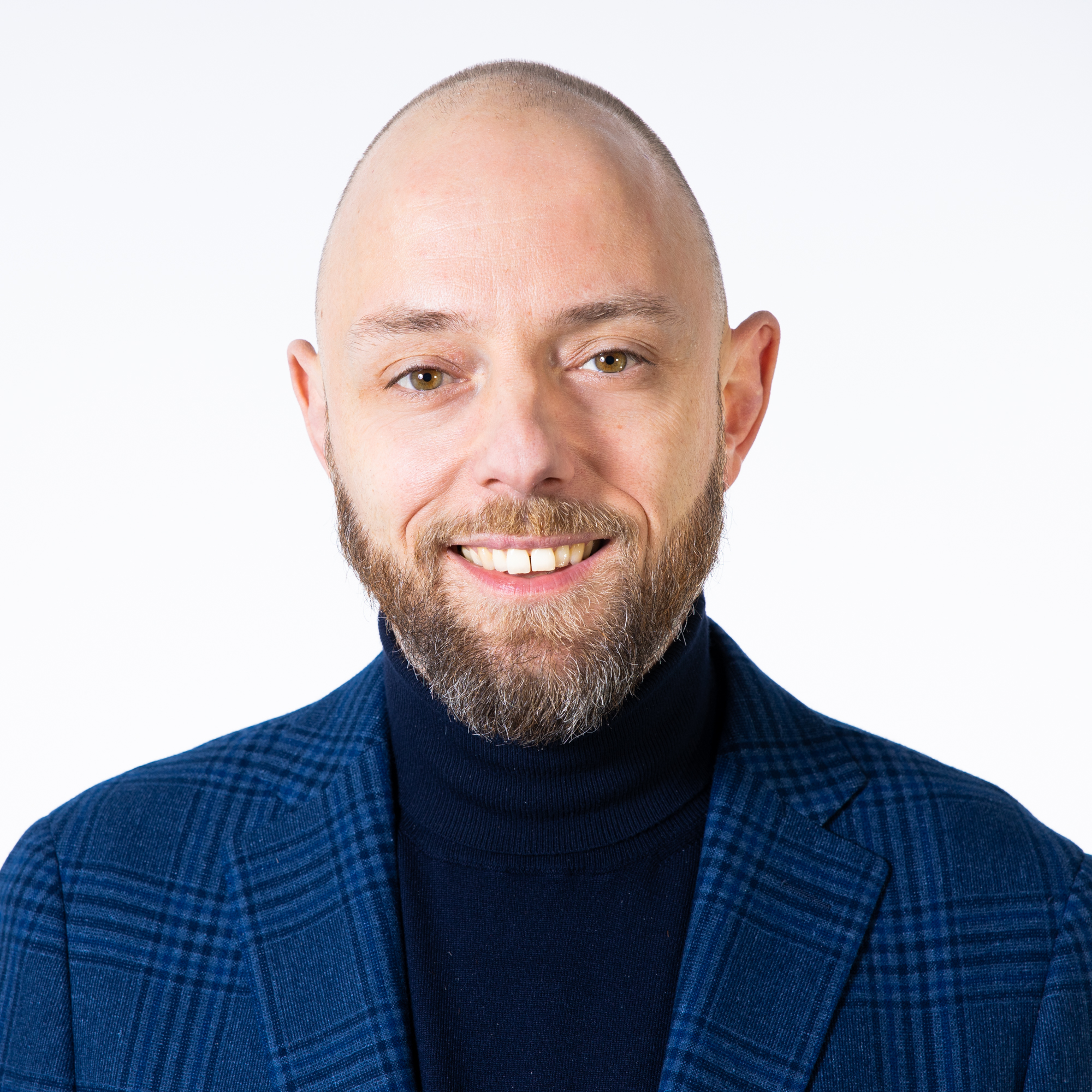
- De Groot in 2020

Member of the House of Representatives
- Incumbent
- Assumed office 31 March 2021

Member of the Harderwijk municipal council
- In office 27 March 2014 – 22 April 2021
- Succeeded by: David Korver

Personal details
- Born: Peter Christiaan de Groot; 9 May 1980 (age 46) Harderwijk, Netherlands
- Party: People's Party for Freedom and Democracy
- Children: 2
- Education: Delft University of Technology

Peter Christiaan de Groot (born 9 May 1980) is a Dutch politician, who has been serving as a member of the House of Representatives since the 2021 general election. He is a member of the conservative liberal People's Party for Freedom and Democracy (VVD), and he also served on the Harderwijk municipal council between 2014 and 2021.

== Early life and career ==
He was born in 1980 in the Gelderland town Harderwijk and grew up in its neighborhood Tweelingstad. His father worked as a building contractor. De Groot studied engineering and policy analysis at the Delft University of Technology. He subsequently started working at infrastructure construction company Strukton Civiel, serving as a strategy and marketing manager between 2014 and his election to the House in 2021.

== Politics ==
De Groot became an active member of the Harderwijk-Hierden VVD in 2009 and was placed seventh on the VVD's party list in the 2010 municipal election in Harderwijk. He did not receive a seat in the municipal council due to his party winning six seats. He was elected to the Harderwijk council in the next municipal election in 2014, when he was his party's third candidate. De Groot served as vice caucus leader of the VVD until he became caucus leader in June 2017, succeeding Bert van Bijsteren. De Groot was re-elected in 2018 as the VVD's second candidate and remained caucus leader.

He ran for member of parliament in the 2021 general election, appearing 24th on the VVD's party list. He was sworn into the House of Representatives on 31 March, having received 1,093 preference votes. He simultaneously vacated his seat in the Harderwijk municipal council. In the House, De Groot became the VVD's spokesperson for infrastructure excluding aviation, shipping, and public transport. His portfolio changed to housing and construction when the fourth Rutte cabinet was installed in January 2022.

A motion by De Groot was carried to facilitate the transformation of holiday parks with few tourists into places of permanent residence in order to address a housing shortage in the Netherlands. When Minister of Housing and Spatial Planning Hugo de Jonge presented a bill in early 2023 that would allow the minister to require municipalities to have at least 30% of new housing units be public housing, De Groot expressed criticism. He said that too much public housing was being constructed in cities such as Amsterdam and that more homes were required for the middle class. De Groot called the plans absurd and added that De Jonge was planning to roll out future deprived neighborhoods all over the country. He took back his words during a debate the following week after they had caused tension amongst the coalition parties.

Following his re-election in November 2023, De Groot served as the VVD's spokesperson for housing, aviation, shipping, water management, and gas extraction from the Groningen field.

=== House committee assignments ===
==== 2021–2023 term ====
- Committee for Agriculture, Nature and Food Quality
- Committee for Infrastructure and Water Management
- Committee for the Interior
- Public Expenditure committee

==== 2023–present term ====
- Committee for Infrastructure and Water Management (chair)
- Committee for the Interior
- Committee for Housing and Spatial Planning

== Personal life ==
De Groot has a wife called Rosalie and two children. He resides in Harderwijk.

== Electoral history ==
Electoral history of Peter de Groot
Year	Body	Party	Pos.	Votes	Result		Ref.
Year	Body	Party	Pos.	Votes	Party seats	Individual	Ref.
2021	House of Representatives	People's Party for Freedom and Democracy	24	1,093	34	Won	
2023	House of Representatives	People's Party for Freedom and Democracy	22	1,515	24	Won	
2025	House of Representatives	People's Party for Freedom and Democracy	16	2,049	22	Won	
