= Sarah Dobbe =

Dutch politician (born 1979)

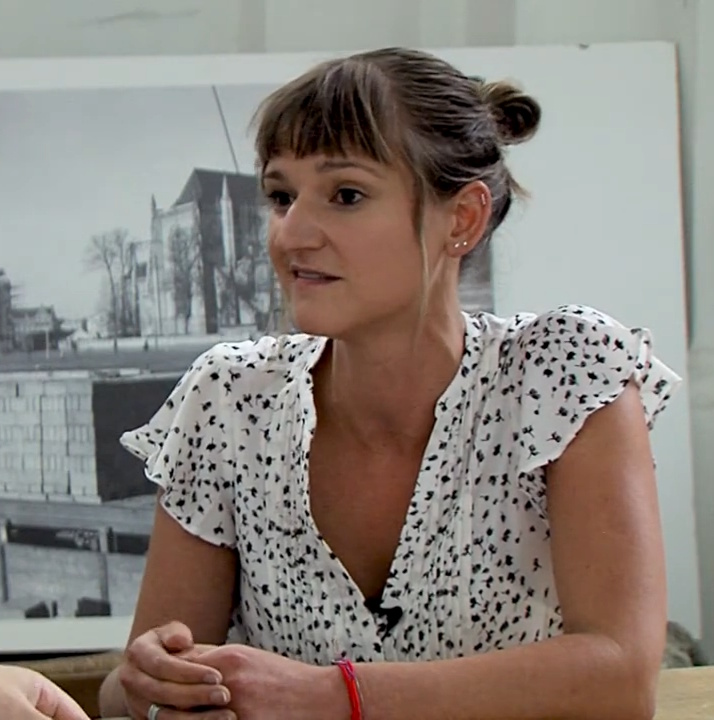

Member of the House of Representatives
- Incumbent
- Assumed office 13 December 2023
- Preceded by: Lilian Marijnissen

Personal details
- Born: 5 April 1979 (age 47) Zwolle, Netherlands
- Party: Socialist Party

Sarah Dobbe (born 5 April 1979) is a Dutch politician representing the Socialist Party who has been a member of the House of Representatives of the Netherlands since December 2023. She replaced party leader Lilian Marijnissen who resigned, and she has served as her party's spokesperson for healthcare, foreign affairs, development cooperation, and emancipation.

== House committee assignments ==
- Committee for Foreign Trade and Development
- Committee for Foreign Affairs

== Electoral history ==
Electoral history of Sarah Dobbe
Year	Body	Party	Pos.	Votes	Result		Ref.
Year	Body	Party	Pos.	Votes	Party seats	Individual	Ref.
2021	House of Representatives	Socialist Party	15	1,810	9 / 150	Lost	
2023	House of Representatives	Socialist Party	6	4,629	5 / 150	Lost (Note: Dobbe was appointed to the body later during the term due to a vacancy.)	
2025	House of Representatives	Socialist Party	3	12,554	3 / 150	Won	
2026	Arnhem Municipal Council	Socialist Party	21 (Note: Dobbe participated as a lijstduwer.)	94	2 / 39	Lost	
