= Chris van Dam =

Dutch politician

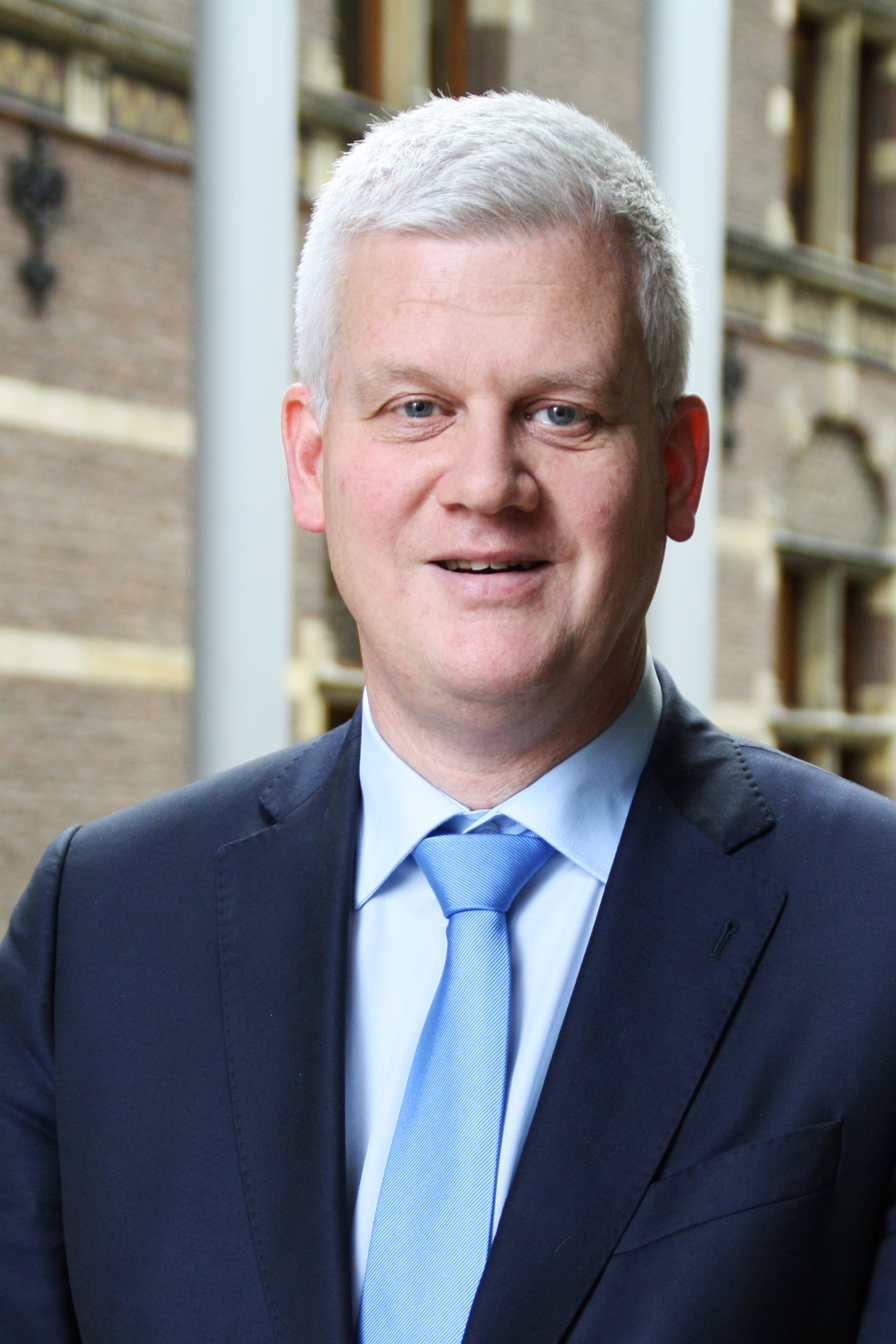

Member of the House of Representatives
- In office 23 March 2017 – 31 March 2021

Personal details
- Born: Christiaan Jan Lodewijk van Dam; 9 July 1963 (age 62) Wilp, Netherlands
- Party: Christian Democratic Appeal
- Occupation: Police officer

Christiaan Jan Lodewijk "Chris" van Dam (born 9 July 1963) is a Dutch politician, policeman and prosecutor who served as a member of the House of Representatives from 2017 to 2021. He is a member of the Christian Democratic Appeal (CDA).

== Biography ==
Chris van Dam was a police officer for 12 years in The Hague before becoming a prosecutor. He mainly worked in Amsterdam, where he was deputy head officer at the public ministry's local branch from 2014 to 2016 before moving back to The Hague to occupy the same position there.

Elected to the House of Representatives in 2017 for the Christian Democratic Appeal, he has cautioned against the overuse of facial recognition technology as a parliamentarian, suggesting that it is "to the detriment of human values", as people become mere data points.

== Electoral history ==
Electoral history of Chris van Dam
Year	Body	Party	Pos.	Votes	Result		Ref.
Year	Body	Party	Pos.	Votes	Party seats	Individual	Ref.
2021	House of Representatives	Christian Democratic Appeal	47	9,360	15	Lost	
