= Rudmer Heerema =

Dutch politician (born 1978)

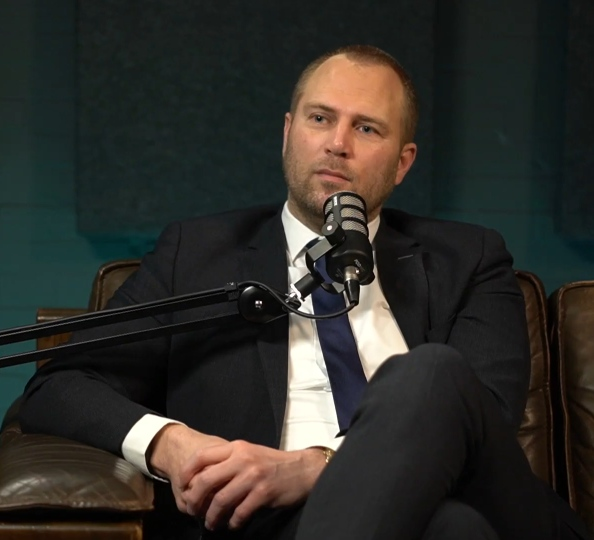

Member of the House of Representatives
- In office 3 September 2013 – 23 March 2017
- In office 31 October 2017 – 5 December 2023

Personal details
- Born: 2 February 1978 (age 48) Groningen
- Party: People's Party for Freedom and Democracy
- Occupation: Politician

Rudmer Heerema (born 2 February 1978, in Groningen) is a Dutch politician of the People's Party for Freedom and Democracy.

Heerema grew up and worked in Alkmaar, where he worked as a physical exercise teacher and was a city councillor from 2006. On 31 July 2013 Heerema was officially declared a member of the Dutch House of Representatives as the successor of Johan Houwers. He started his term on 3 September 2013. His term in office ended on 23 March 2017. He once again became member on 31 October 2017.

== Electoral history ==
Electoral history of Rudmer Heerema
Year	Body	Party	Pos.	Votes	Result		Ref.
Year	Body	Party	Pos.	Votes	Party seats	Individual	Ref.
2021	House of Representatives	People's Party for Freedom and Democracy	29	2,119	34 / 150	Won	
2026	Alkmaar Municipal Council	People's Party for Freedom and Democracy	34 (Note: Heerema participated as a lijstduwer.)	19	4 / 39	Lost	
