= Joeri Pool =

Dutch politician (born 1993)

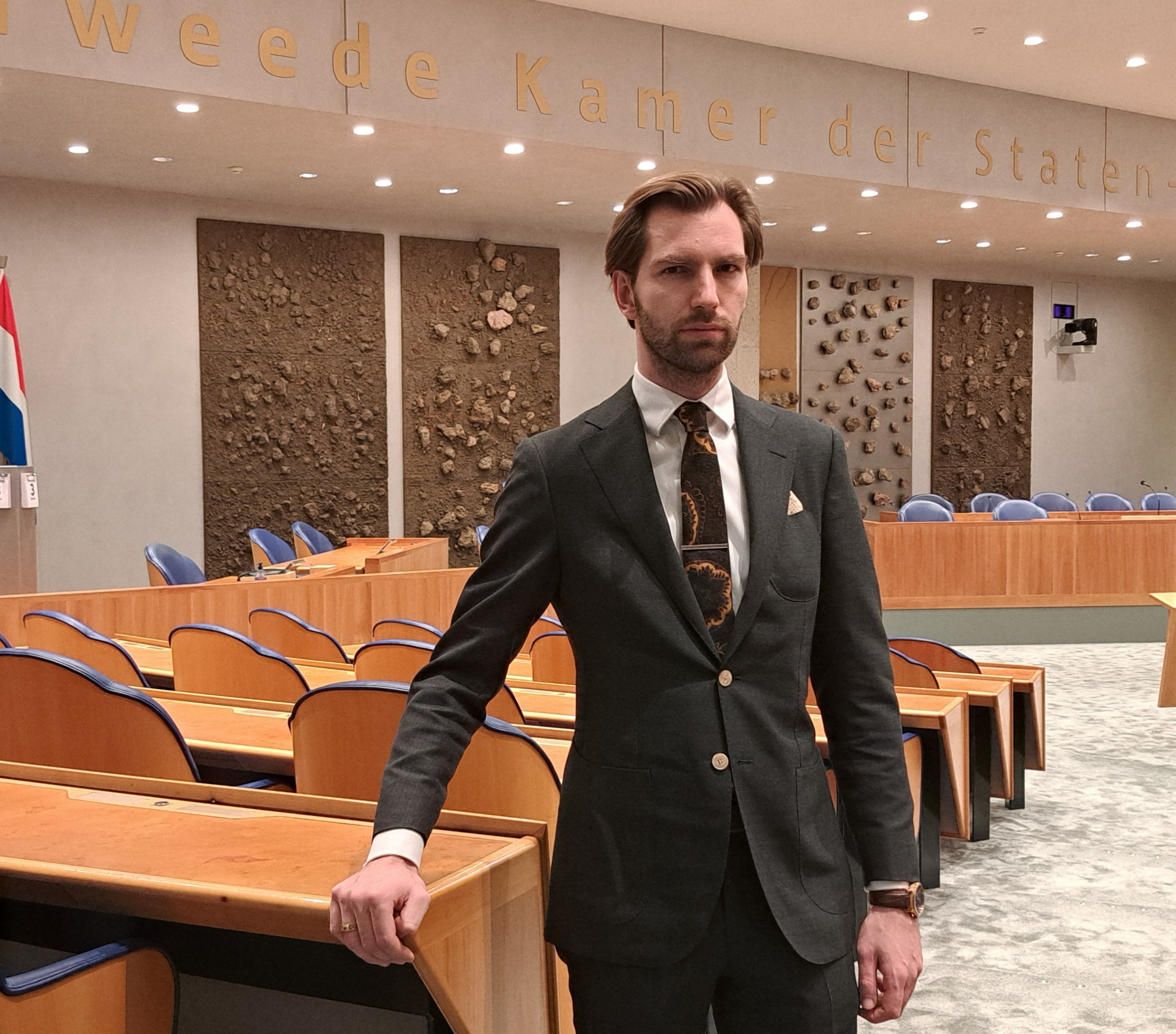
- Pool in 2024

Member of the House of Representatives
- In office 6 December 2023 – 11 November 2025

Member of the Provincial Council of Overijssel
- In office 29 March 2019 – 30 March 2023

Personal details
- Born: 22 February 1993 (age 33) Zwolle, Netherlands
- Party: PVV
- Education: Koninklijke Militaire Academie; Utrecht University
- Occupation: Politician

Joeri Pool (born 22 February 1993) is a Dutch politician of the Party for Freedom (PVV). He was a member of the Provincial Council of Overijssel from 2019 to 2023 and was a member of the House of Representatives from 2023 to 2025. He was the PVV's spokesman on defense and national security.

== Biography ==
=== Early life and education ===
Pool was born in Zwolle in 1993. He attended the Koninklijke Militaire Academie (Royal Military Academy) in Breda on a six month basic military training course before studying a bachelor's degree in history and then a master's degree in political science at the Utrecht University. After graduating he worked within the IT sector.

=== Political career ===
Pool worked as a senior policy officer for the PVV's parliamentary faction and was elected to the Provincial Council of Overijssel in 2019. In 2021, he submitted an application to become mayor in his hometown of Kampen becoming the first PVV politician to directly seek mayorship and said his decision was due to crime and antisocial behaviour from residents of a nearby asylum centre.

During the 2023 Dutch general election, Pool was elected to the House of Representatives on the PVV's list. In his February 2024 maiden speech, he argued the Dutch government was endangering national security through its support of Ukraine during that country's invasion by Russia. He referred to the Dutch policy as a stream of provocations towards Russia. This drew sharp criticism from other parties in the House, and fellow PVV MP Raymond de Roon later called Pool's comments reductive.

In the general election of 29 October 2025, Pool was not re-elected.

=== House committee assignments ===
- Committee for Justice and Security (chair)
- Committee for European Affairs
- Committee for Foreign Trade and Development
- Committee for Foreign Affairs
- Committee for Defence

== Electoral history ==
Electoral history of Joeri Pool
Year	Body	Party	Pos.	Votes	Result		Ref.
Year	Body	Party	Pos.	Votes	Party seats	Individual	Ref.
2021	House of Representatives	Party for Freedom	28	233	17	Lost	
2023	House of Representatives	Party for Freedom	37	296	37	Won	
2025	House of Representatives	Party for Freedom	31	204	26	Lost	
