= Romke de Jong =

Dutch politician (born 1984)

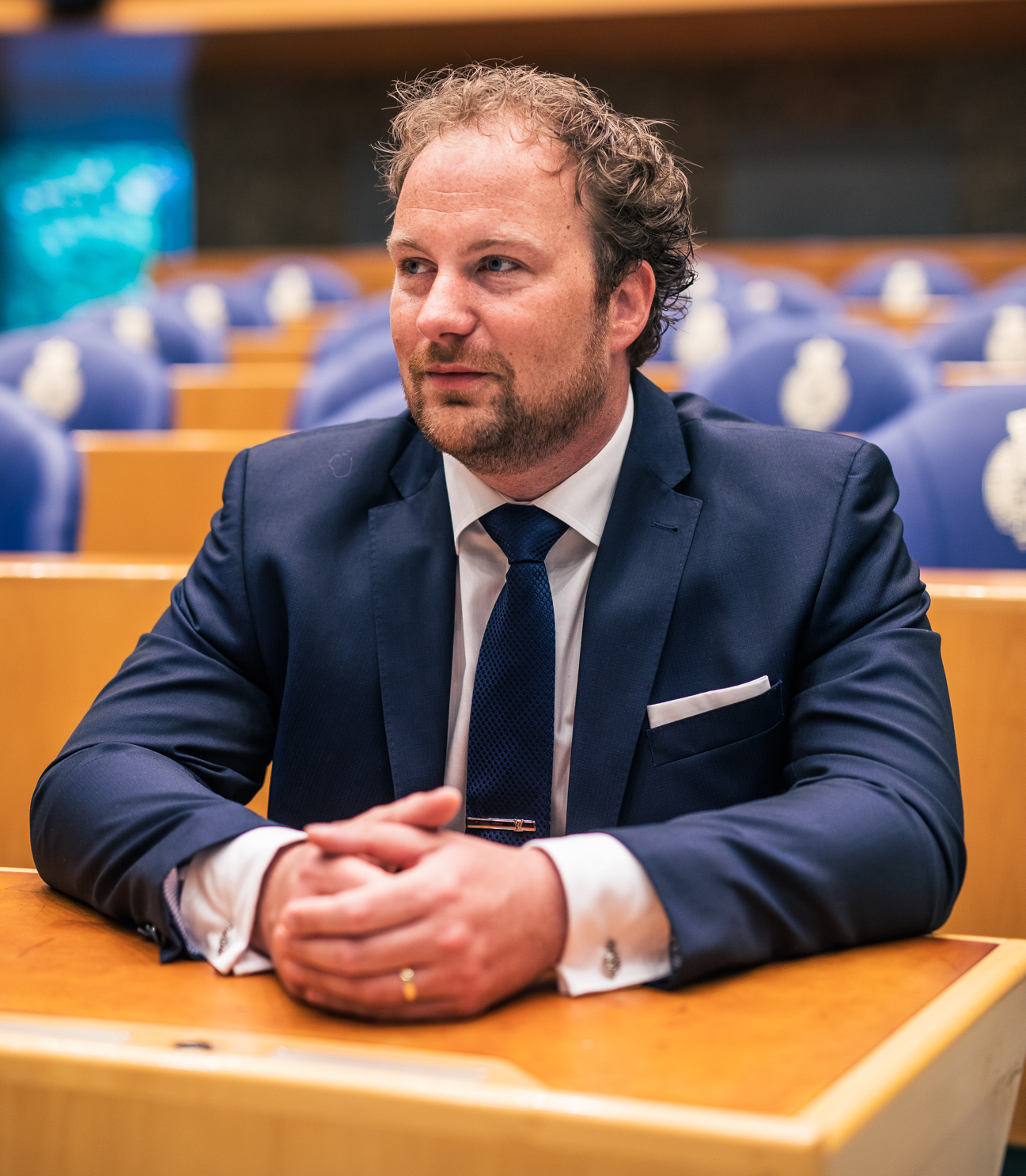
- De Jong in the House of Representatives

Member of the House of Representatives
- Incumbent
- Assumed office 31 March 2021

Member of the States of Friesland
- In office 28 March 2019 – 21 April 2021
- Succeeded by: Danny van der Weijde

Member of the Opsterland municipal council
- In office March 2010 – 4 December 2017
- Succeeded by: Maaike de Lang

Personal details
- Born: Romke Harke de Jong; 5 April 1984 (age 42) Heerenveen, Netherlands
- Party: Democrats 66
- Children: 3
- Education: Hanze University of Applied Sciences
- Website: romkedejong.nl

Romke Harke de Jong (born 5 April 1984) is a Dutch entrepreneur and politician of the social liberal party Democrats 66 (D66). He took over and expanded his father's ice cream catering company and served on the municipal council of Opsterland in Friesland between 2010 and 2018. De Jong became a member of the States of Friesland the following year, and he was elected to the House of Representatives in the 2021 general election.

== Early life and non-political career ==
De Jong was born in 1984 in the Friesland city of Heerenveen and grew up in the nearby town of Gorredijk. His father was the owner of a restaurant and a Gorredijk ice cream catering company, founded by Romke's grandfather in 1947, called De Jong's IJs. His father also served as an Opsterland municipal councilor and alderman for D66 in the 1990s. De Jong started working for De Jong's IJs in his teenage years, and he studied commercial economics at the Hanze University of Applied Sciences in Groningen.

In 2006, while studying, he became co-owner of De Jong's IJs. De Jong and his father expanded their company by constructing a larger factory and by starting a franchise chain of ice cream and chocolate shops under the name Lilly's. Several locations were opened in 2009, most of them located in the northern provinces of the Netherlands. A Lilly's store on the Caribbean island Bonaire was opened in early 2011. The number of locations kept increasing to over ten until a spike was reached. Lilly's had six stores left in 2016, while the production capacity of De Jong's IJs was being raised. De Jong also invested to make his factory carbon neutral. His father temporarily took over as CEO when he became an MP in 2021.

== Politics ==
=== Local and provincial ===
De Jong was a member of Young Democrats, Democrats 66's independent youth wing, after a short period at the Labour Party. He ran for Opsterland municipal councilor in the 2006 municipal elections as the third candidate of the new local party Opsterlanders, which had come into existence due to a merger of Opsterland Anders and the local chapters of D66 and GroenLinks. De Jong did not become a council member, as Opsterlanders won one seat.

D66 left the partnership Opsterlanders in the run-up to the 2010 municipal election in Opsterland. De Jong was D66's lead candidate and was elected to the municipal council. He was re-elected in 2014 as D66's lead candidate, and he was again the only member of his party in the municipal council. D66 became part of the governing coalition in Opsterland but left after the party had lost faith in an alderman in March 2016. De Jong gave up his seat in the municipal council in December 2017 to focus on his business.

He re-entered politics in the 2019 provincial election in Friesland, when he was elected to the Provincial Council of Friesland as D66's lead candidate. De Jong campaigned on constructing the Lelylijn, a proposed railway between Lelystad and Groningen. In the States Provincial, he introduced a bill to reduce regulations on wind turbine construction by local communities, but it did not receive a majority.

=== House of Representatives ===
In the 2021 general election, De Jong was D66's 24th candidate. During the campaign, he said that he wanted the Netherlands to become a frontrunner in achieving a circular economy and that he wanted the government to financially support that transition. De Jong was elected with 2,280 preference votes and was sworn into the House of Representatives on 31 March. He vacated his seat in the Provincial Council of Friesland the following month, and he also left his ice cream company. In the House, De Jong is D66's spokesperson for economic affairs, labor market, SMEs, foreign trade, tourism, innovation, space travel, declining regions, competition, taxes, customs, state benefits, and state ownership.

In 2022, in order to increase the tax burden on wealthy individuals, he called for a hike in the tax rate for income from substantial interests in companies, which is referred to as box 2 in the Dutch tax system. He also proposed for the government to stand as a guarantor for loans intended to make small and medium-sized enterprises more sustainable in order to make it easier to obtain such loans at banks. He advised to appropriate €50 million to €100 million for this purpose, and he later came with plans together with Thierry Aartsen (VVD) to establish a €150-million guarantor fund for microfinancing of sustainability projects in light of raising interest rates. To address personnel shortages in multiple sectors, De Jong was in favor of welcoming more foreign workers to the Netherlands; D66 was the only major party supportive of plans by the European Commission to ease entry requirements for workers from Egypt, Tunisia, and Morocco.

As part of the Dutch farmers' protests, demonstrators blocked the entryways of De Jong's ice cream factory for the entirety of 2 July 2022 using tractors to prevent deliveries from coming through. Politicians of D66 had earlier proposed to halve the Netherlands' livestock in order to protect nature reserves from reactive nitrogen emissions and in order to allow for the construction of homes and infrastructure following a verdict by the Council of State that those emissions had to be lowered. De Jong refused to comply with the demand of the farmers to have a discussion, saying he only has conversations when there is decency and mutual respect. When the collapse of the fourth Rutte cabinet triggered a snap election in November 2023, De Jong announced he would not run for re-election, citing his young family.

==== Committee assignments ====
- Committee for Agriculture, Nature and Food Quality
- Committee for Digital Affairs
- Committee for Economic Affairs and Climate Policy
- Committee for Finance
- Committee for Foreign Trade and Development Cooperation
- Committee for Infrastructure and Water Management
- Committee for Social Affairs and Employment
- Public Expenditure Committee

== Personal life ==
De Jong lives in the Friesland town of Gorredijk, where he has lived his entire life except for when he studied in Groningen. He has a wife called Wendel and three sons, the last of whom was born in March 2021.

== Electoral history ==
Electoral history of Romke de Jong
Year	Body	Party	Pos.	Votes	Result		Ref.
Year	Body	Party	Pos.	Votes	Party seats	Individual	Ref.
2021	House of Representatives	Democrats 66	24	2,280	24	Won	
