= Daan de Neef =

Dutch politician (born 1977)

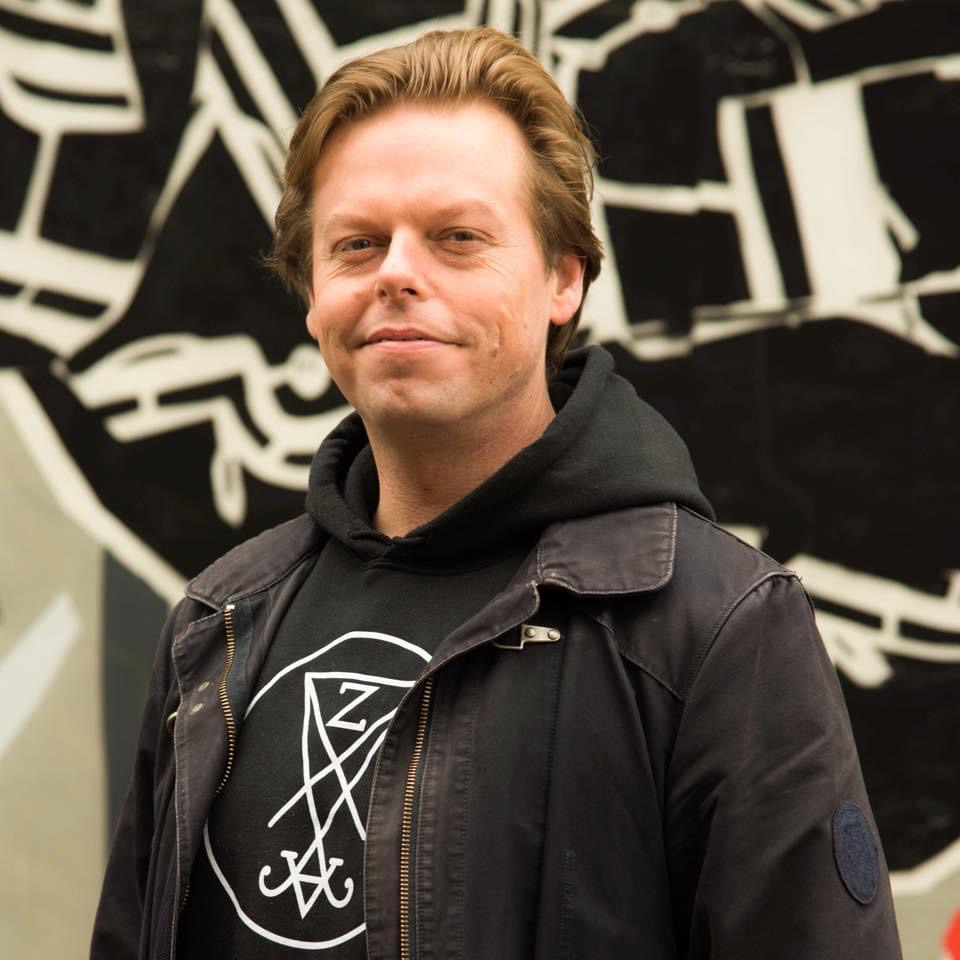
- De Neef in 2018

Member of the House of Representatives
- In office 31 March 2021 – 6 September 2022
- Succeeded by: Martijn Grevink

Member of the Breda municipal council
- In office 29 March 2018 – 1 April 2021
- Succeeded by: Ton Overeem

Personal details
- Born: Daniël de Neef; 15 September 1977 (age 49) Rotterdam, Netherlands
- Party: Party for the Animals (since 2022)
- Other political affiliations: People's Party for Freedom and Democracy (until 2022)
- Education: Utrecht University of Applied Sciences

Daniël "Daan" de Neef (born 15 September 1977) is a Dutch speechwriter and former politician. A member of the conservative liberal People's Party for Freedom and Democracy (VVD), De Neef was a political staffer of the VVD and owned a speech consultancy. He held a seat in the Breda municipal council starting in 2018 and was elected to the House of Representatives in the 2021 general election. De Neef stepped down the following year and switched to the Party for the Animals (PvdD) shortly after.

== Early life and career ==
=== Education and speechwriting ===
De Neef was born and raised in Rotterdam, living in its neighborhood Oosterflank. He attended the secondary school MAVO Kralingen and studied journalism at the Utrecht University of Applied Sciences. He also studied philosophy in 2010 for one year at Leiden University.

Starting in 2003, De Neef worked as a press secretary of the VVD's House caucus. He has told in an interview that he decided to join the VVD for its openness towards people with different beliefs. He mentioned he found progressives dogmatic and Christian politicians exclusive. He enjoyed his role for the VVD despite his occasional disagreements. De Neef was the editor of the 2004 book Ode aan de vrijheid (Ode to freedom), which contains introductions to liberal philosophers by prominent VVD members including Jozias van Aartsen, Frits Bolkestein, Ayaan Hirsi Ali, and Geert Wilders, the latter of whom left the party around the time of the book's publication. Another book by De Neef was published in 2008 called Canon van de filosofie. It lists the 76 most important philosophical works based on the opinions of 24 professors, and it was an initiative of Filosofie Magazine. He also served on the municipal council of Nieuwerkerk aan den IJssel.

While working for the VVD's House caucus, De Neef occasionally wrote speeches for Prime Minister Mark Rutte. He left his job to become a speechwriter at the Ministry of Social Affairs and Employment.

=== Local and national politics ===
De Neef was placed 56th on the VVD's party list in the 2010 general election. He received 183 preference votes and was not elected, as his party won 31 seats. Shortly after, De Neef returned from the ministry to the VVD, where he was responsible for the communication between Mark Rutte's office and the party's House caucus. He was the VVD's seventh candidate in Breda in the 2018 municipal elections and was elected to the council. De Neef's focus was on sustainability, nature, animal welfare, public space, and education. In the council, he proposed introducing a community service officer concerned solely with animal issues. He also founded and ran a speech and presentation consultancy called Epic Empire, and he simultaneously served as adjunct secretary for communication of the Raad voor Dierenaangelegenheden (Animal affairs council) starting in March 2020.

De Neef again ran for member of parliament in the 2021 general election as the VVD's 34th candidate. He was also part of the committee that wrote the party's election program. The VVD won exactly 34 seats, causing De Neef to get elected, and he personally received 928 votes. De Neef was sworn into the House of Representatives on 31 March and was the VVD's spokesperson for youth policy, the Youth Act, youth health care, civilian service, and sheltered housing (formerly also occupational safety and health, poverty, and credit counseling). He was on the Committees for Agriculture, Nature and Food Quality; for Health, Welfare and Sport; and for Social Affairs and Employment. De Neef announced on 31 August 2022 that he would leave the VVD after eighteen years and vacate his seat in the House of Representatives. In a statement, he said that he could no longer defend the party's lack of compassion when dealing with asylum seekers, referring to its response to capacity problems at the Dutch application center in Ter Apel. Besides, he was struggling with the VVD's position on animal welfare. De Neef was succeeded by Martijn Grevink on 6 September 2022, and he became a member of the Party for the Animals on 4 October, World Animal Day. He admitted he had always voted for that party with two exceptions on which he had cast his ballot for the VVD.

De Neef took a job as advisor at a strategic communication consultancy in June 2023. When the collapse of the fourth Rutte cabinet in July 2023 triggered a snap election in November, De Neef was picked to lead the campaign of the Party for the Animals. However, he stepped down on 11 September when the party's board would not nominate party leader Esther Ouwehand as the lead candidate in the snap election due to an internal conflict. De Neef declared that he could not work for a board that is treating Ouwehand in that manner. Following more criticism, the board resigned and Ouwehand was reinstated as lead candidate. De Neef decided to return as campaign leader. The NRC reported that his initial appointment to the post had been part of the conflict, as De Neef and Ouwehand were close friends.

== Personal life ==
While a member of parliament, De Neef moved from Breda to The Hague, and he has before lived in Rotterdam and The Hague. He is vegan, and since 2020 he has been in a relationship with Leonie Gerritsen, a member of the Party for the Animals who is a municipal councilor in The Hague and who was her party's 23rd candidate in the 2021 general election. A fan of death, black, and doom metal, De Neef was the singer of heavy metal band Concedo Nulli. His favorite band is Amenra.

== Electoral history ==
Electoral history of Daan de Neef
Year	Body	Party	Pos.	Votes	Result		Ref.
Year	Body	Party	Pos.	Votes	Party seats	Individual	Ref.
2021	House of Representatives	People's Party for Freedom and Democracy	34	928	34	Won	
