= Carline van Breugel =

Dutch politician (born 1994)

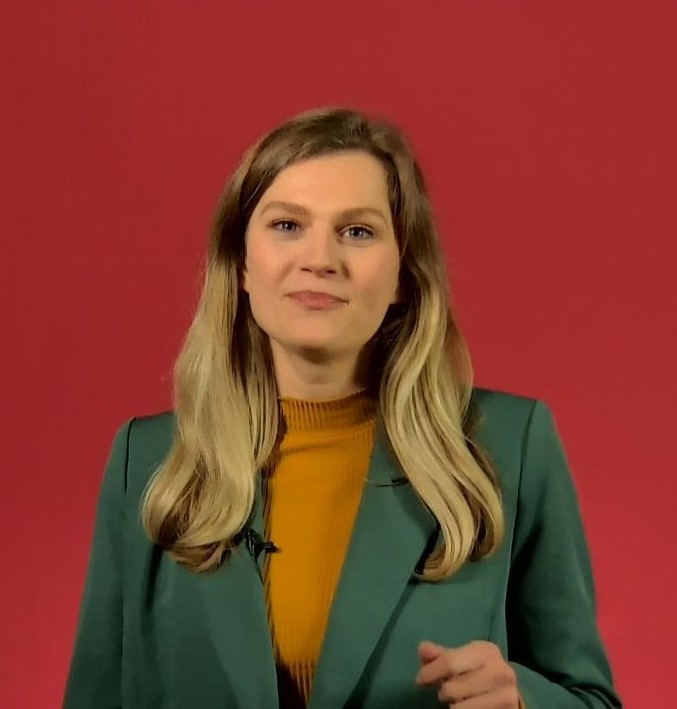
- Van Breugel in 2021

Member of the House of Representatives
- In office 25 October 2023 – 5 December 2023

Personal details
- Born: 22 October 1994 (age 31) Eindhoven, Netherlands
- Party: Democrats 66

Carline van Breugel (born 22 October 1994) is a Dutch politician for Democrats 66.

== Electoral history ==
Electoral history of Carline van Breugel
Year	Body	Party	Pos.	Votes	Result		Ref.
Year	Body	Party	Pos.	Votes	Party seats	Individual	Ref.
2021	House of Representatives	Democrats 66	32	15,004	24	Lost (Note: Van Breugel was appointed to the body later during the term due to a vacancy.)	
2023	House of Representatives	Democrats 66	24	1,997	9	Lost	
