= Bart Smals =

Dutch politician (born 1970)

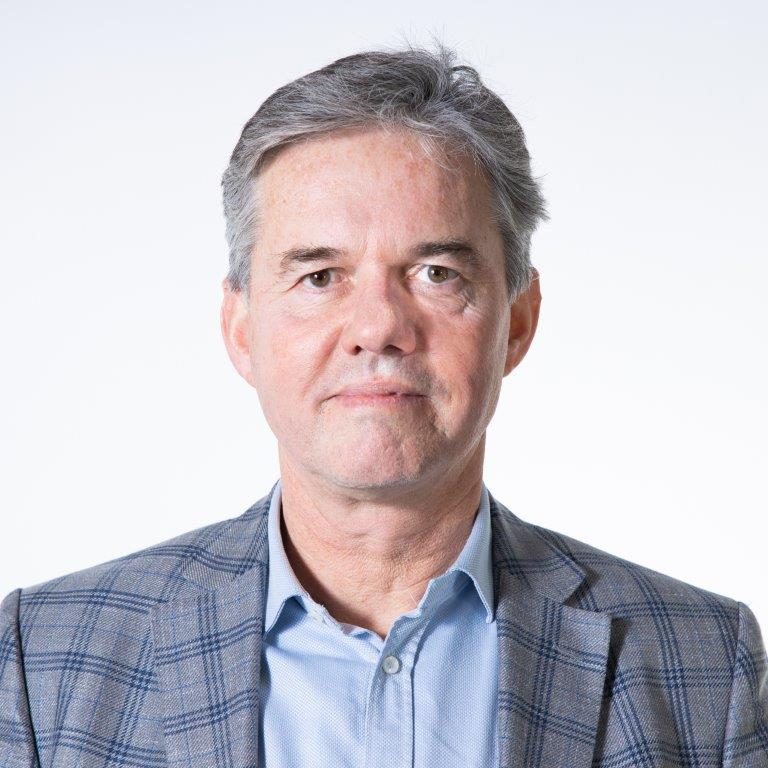

Member of the House of Representatives
- Incumbent
- Assumed office 3 July 2019

Personal details
- Born: 5 April 1970 (age 56) Breda, Netherlands
- Party: People's Party for Freedom and Democracy
- Education: Utrecht University
- Occupation: Politician

Bart Max Geert Smals (born 5 April 1970) is a Dutch politician serving as a member of the House of Representatives since 2019. A member of the People's Party for Freedom and Democracy (VVD), he previously chaired the party group in the municipal council of Delft from 2014 to 2019.

A pharmacist by trade, he grew up in Apeldoorn. He studied at Utrecht University before moving to Maarssenbroek.

== Electoral history ==
Electoral history of Bart Smals
Year	Body	Party	Pos.	Votes	Result		Ref.
Year	Body	Party	Pos.	Votes	Party seats	Individual	Ref.
2021	House of Representatives	People's Party for Freedom and Democracy	35	736	37 / 150	Lost (Note: Smals was appointed to the body later during the term due to a vacancy.)	
2026	Delft Municipal Council	People's Party for Freedom and Democracy	32 (Note: Smals participated as a lijstduwer.)	13	3 / 39	Lost	
