= Noortje Thijssen =

Dutch politician

- Noortje Thijssen in 2023

Member of the Senate
- Incumbent
- Assumed office 13 June 2023

Personal details
- Born: Noortje Carolien Thijssen; 20 September 1983 (age 43) Gouda, Netherlands
- Party: GroenLinks (until 2026); PvdA (2023–2026); PRO (since 2026)
- Children: 1
- Education: Utrecht University (2001–2006); University of Amsterdam (2006–2012)

Noortje Carolien Thijssen (born 20 September 1983) is a Dutch politician and former lobbyist. She has been a member of the Dutch Senate since 13 June 2023 for GroenLinks and since 2026 for Progressief Nederland (PRO). She is also co-director of the Scientific Bureau Solidarity, a think tank linked to PRO, having previously been director of the Scientific Bureau GroenLinks from 2020 to 2026.

== Early life ==
Noortje Thijssen was born on 20 September 1983 in Gouda. After completing her secondary education in Leiden in 2001, Thijssen began studying sociology at Utrecht University, graduating in December 2005–January 2006. She then studied social sciences at the University of Amsterdam, obtaining her PhD in 2012, with a thesis on the ideals of the 1960s. From 2014 to 2020, Thijssen worked as senior advisor and partner for public affairs and lobbying firm Public Matters, and from 2020 to 2021 she was the owner of the firm Voor Impact.

== Political career ==
Thijssen began her political career as a member of GroenLinks, working as a policy advisor for the GroenLinks group in the House of Representatives from 2006 to 2014. In 2006, Thijssen was co-secretary of the committee that wrote the electoral manifesto of GroenLinks for the 2006 Dutch general election.

Thijssen was one of the leaders of the Klub Kobalt movement, named after a café in Amsterdam where it was founded, in 2013. Its manifesto called for significant changes within GroenLinks, including closer cooperation with green entrepreneurs and other figures within Dutch society, and abandoning ideology in favor of organizing "apolitical idealists" around individual issues. In 2017, Thijssen participated in the candidate selection commission for the 2017 Dutch general election, and was chair of the committee to select candidates for the 2019 European Parliament election.

In 2020, Thijssen became interim director of the Scientific Bureau GroenLinks, the party's think tank, becoming full director a year later. In 2023, Thijssen teamed up with Tim 'S Jongers, director of the Wiardi Beckman Stichting with the goal of revitalizing the political left in the Netherlands. The pair collaborated on a 2023 book Het tij keren. Samen voor een hoopvolle toekomst, the 2023 Willem Dreeslezing, and worked on the 2023 electoral manifesto for the GroenLinks-PvdA alliance. That same year, Thijssen became a member of the Labour Party (PvdA) in addition to her membership of GroenLinks. She was also a writer of the ideological program of Progressief Nederland in 2025 and 2026.

=== Senate ===
Thijssen became a member of the Dutch Senate on 13 June 2023. As a senator, Thijssen focuses on infrastructure, water management, and the environment.

== Personal life ==
Thijssen is married, and has one daughter.
