= Wim Jaspers =

Dutch politician

Member of the Senate
- Incumbent
- Assumed office 13 June 2023

Personal details
- Born: W.C.P.H. Jaspers; 27 April 1961 (age 65) Geldrop, Netherlands
- Party: BBB
- Other political affiliations: List Someren-Heide; List Working on Water
- Children: 3

W.C.P.H. "Wim" Jaspers (born 27 April 1961) is a Dutch horse farmer and politician. He has been a member of the Dutch Senate for the Farmer-Citizen Movement (BBB) since 13 June 2023.

== Early life ==
Wim Jaspers was born on 27 April 1961 in Geldrop. He was born into a farming family. Until 2006, Jaspers operated a pig and dairy farm together with his brother. Since 2013, Jaspers has been the owner of a horse farm in the village of Someren-Heide, and has led an association dedicated to protecting the Dutch Draft and Haflinger horse breeds on both the national and regional level. From 2015 to 2019, he was a member of the executive board of the De Dommel water board. Jaspers has worked at a tree nursery since 2019. He also led the Southern Netherlands branch of the LTO Nederland for fifteen years.

== Political career ==
Jaspers first entered politics in the municipality of Someren where he resides, being elected to the municipal council in 2002. He is a member of the local political party List Someren-Heide (LSH), having served as a member of the party leadership since 2021. Jaspers left the municipal council in 2010 to become an alderman, responsible for the environment, water, and spatial planning, which he remained until 2014. He subsequently returned to the municipal council for a short period between March to May 2014.

Jaspers became involved with the Farmer-Citizen Movement (BBB) from an early stage, affiliating the LSH to the BBB and personally inviting BBB leader Caroline van der Plas to his town for a work visit in 2021. For the 2021 Dutch general election, Jaspers was placed fifth on the BBB's electoral list, but he was not elected. That same year, Jaspers joined the national executive of the BBB, in which he served until 2024. In 2023, Jaspers was elected to the Senate for the BBB. As a senator, Jaspers has focused on agriculture and education, and has served as treasurer of the BBB Senate group since 1 October 2025. He has been a deputy member of the Benelux Parliament since 2025.

== Personal life ==
Jaspers is married, and has one son and three daughters. He is a Catholic, and has been part of the leadership of a local Catholic parish.
