= Janny Bakker-Klein =

Dutch politician

Member of the Senate
- Incumbent
- Assumed office 13 June 2023

Personal details
- Born: Jannetje Bakker; 6 January 1960 (age 66) Huizen, Netherlands
- Party: CDA
- Children: 1
- Education: Utrecht University (1988-1995); Erasmus University Rotterdam (2008-2019)

Jannetje "Janny" Bakker-Klein (born 6 January 1960) is a Dutch politician and government official. She has been a member of the Dutch Senate since 13 June 2023 for the Christian Democratic Appeal (CDA).

== Early life ==
Janny Bakker was born on 6 January 1960 in Huizen. She completed healthcare training as a general nurse at the Diakonessenziekenhuis in Naarden and as a surgical assistant at the Onze Lieve Vrouwe Gasthuis in Amsterdam. After completing these training programs, she started working as an operating room assistant at the Academic Hospital Utrecht. From 1988 to 1993, she studied Dutch law, followed by law, administration, and management for the next two years at Utrecht University, where she graduated in 1995.

After finishing her studies, she worked as a policy officer at the Dutch Patients and Consumers Federation until 1999, and then as director of the Dutch Kidney Foundation until 2006.

== Political career ==
In 2002, Bakker-Klein was elected as a municipal councilor for the municipality of Huizen, and from June 2006, Bakker-Klein served as alderwoman and deputy mayor. As an alderwomen, she was responsible for finance, health, housing and land, and social affairs. She was a member of the national executive board of the Christian Democratic Appeal (CDA) for some time starting in November 2014. In June 2018, Bakker-Klein stepped down as alderwoman. After her term as alderwoman, Bakker-Klein became chair of the board of directors of the Kennisinstituut Movisie in September 2018. In December 2019, she obtained her PhD from the Erasmus University Rotterdam with her dissertation "Anders kijken. Een zoek naar responsiviteit in het sociaal domein".

On June 13, 2023, Bakker-Klein was sworn in as a member of the Senate, representing the CDA. Her maiden speech focused on the connection between people's lived experiences and the "systemic world" of government. As a senator, Bakker-Klein has focused on finances and taxation, as well as social affairs.

== Personal life ==
Bakker is married and has a son.

== Awards ==
Bakker is a member of the Order of Orange-Nassau, as a result of her volunteer work.
