= Rens Raemakers =

Dutch politician (born 1991)

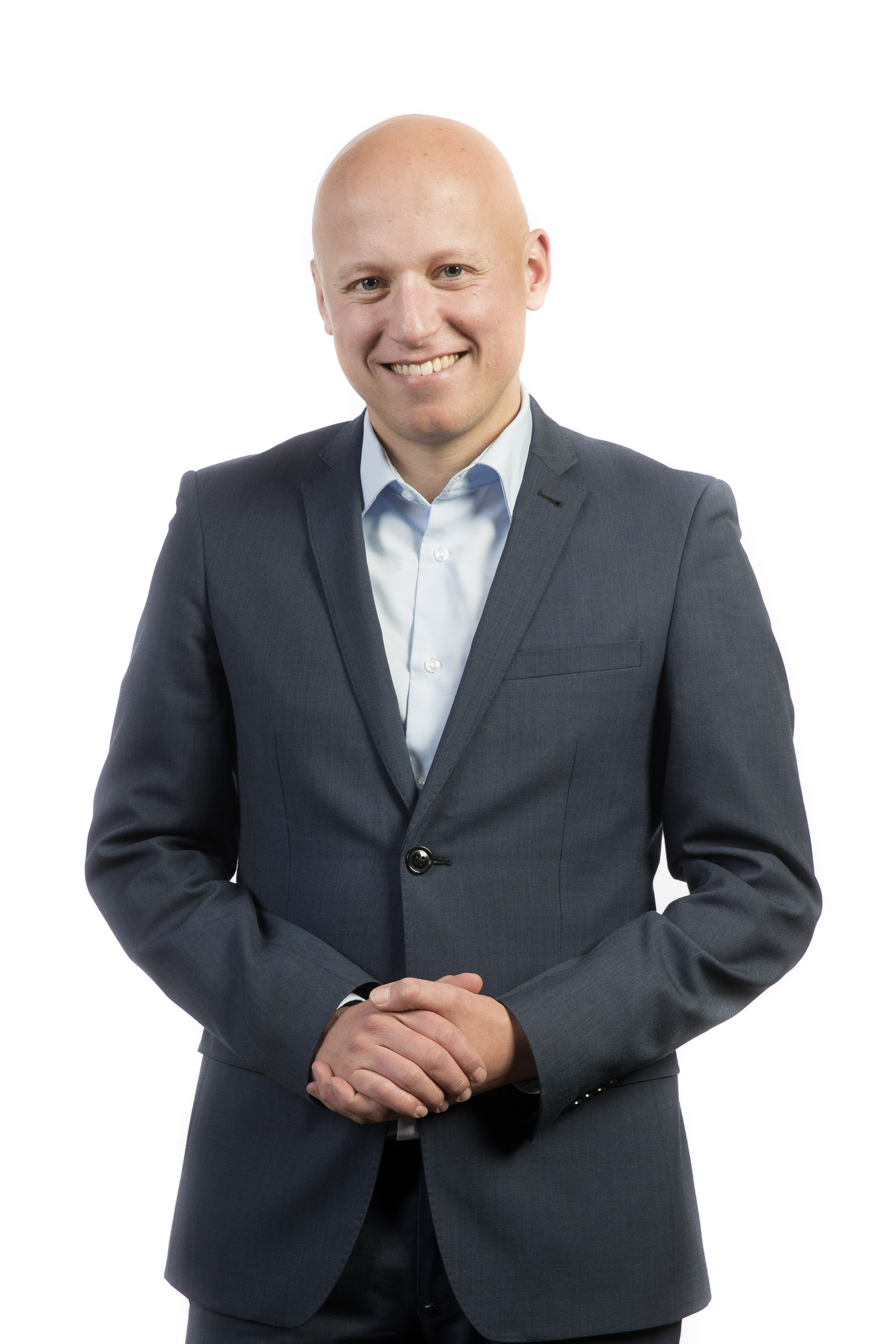

Member of the House of Representatives
- In office 23 March 2017 – 13 January 2020
- In office 13 May 2020 – 25 October 2021
- In office 16 February 2022 – 5 December 2023

Personal details
- Born: March 27, 1991 (age 35) Netherlands
- Party: Democrats 66

Rens Raemakers (born 27 March 1991) is a Dutch politician from the Democrats 66.

== Electoral history ==
Electoral history of Rens Raemakers
Year	Body	Party	Pos.	Votes	Result		Ref.
Year	Body	Party	Pos.	Votes	Party seats	Individual	Ref.
2021	House of Representatives	Democrats 66	19	9,699	24	Won	
