= Joris van den Oetelaar =

Dutch politician

Member of the Senate

Member of the States of North Brabant
- Incumbent
- Assumed office 28 March 2019
- Incumbent
- Assumed office 11 June 2019

Personal details
- Born: 1965 (age 60–61) Amsterdam, Netherlands
- Party: Forum for Democracy

Joris van den Oetelaar (born 1983) is a Dutch politician of the Forum for Democracy (FvD) party and a Member of the Senate since 2023.

He worked in publishing before joining the FvD at the time of its founding and was elected to the Provincial Council of North Brabant in 2019. He has served in the Senate for the FvD since the 2023 Dutch Senate election.
