= Communist Workers Organisation (Netherlands) =

The Communist Workers Organisation (Dutch: Kommunistische Arbeidersorganisatie, or KAO) was a communist group in the Netherlands. It was founded as the Marxist-Leninist Rotterdam Group (Groep Rotterdam marxistisch-leninistisch in March 1972 by a group of dissidents from the Communist Unity Movement of the Netherlands (marxist-leninist) (KEN (ml)), following the departure of the 'Proletarian' wing of the KEN (ml) in October 1971. (This proletarian wing would later evolve into the Socialist Party.)

The Groep Rotterdam rapidly changed its name to Communists Circle of Rijnmond (marxist-leninist) (Kommunisten Kring Rijnmond (marxistisch-leninistisch), abbreviated KKR (ml)). According to a Dutch internal security service (BVD) estimate the KKR (ml) had 17 members in 1972.

In 1974 KKR (ml) renamed itself to the Communist Organisation of Rotterdam and Surroundings (marxist-leninist) (Kommunistische Organisatie Rotterdam en Omstreken (marxistisch-leninistisch), abbreviated KORO (ml)). The following year the name of the organization was changed once again, now to KAO. The shift from KORO (ml) to KAO marked, in the understanding of the group itself, a step from being a local organisation to a national party-building one.

The same year, the KAO was engaged in unity talks held amongst the Dutch fringe left. This included the KEN (ml), the organisation of which the KAO was a split, as well as several other organisations that had split from the KEN (ml):

- the Group of Marxist-Leninists/Red Dawn (GML),
- the Communist Circle of Breda (marxist-leninist) (KKB (ml))
- the League of Dutch Marxist-Leninists (BNML).

Excluded from these talks were the Socialist Party (that had moved away from the Maoist orthodoxy), Red Youth (which had developed a terroristic orientation) and the Marxist-Leninist Party of the Netherlands (a BVD proxy).

GML excluded itself from the process due to their rejection of unity with KEN (ml), and KEN (ml) could not arrive at a comprise with the other groups due to their persistence on claiming hegemony over the other factions. In 1978 KAO merged with the two remaining factions, the BNML and KKB (ml) to form the Communist Workers Organisation (marxist-leninist) (KAO (ml)).

== Literature ==
- Harmsen, G. (1982): Nederlands Kommunisme. Gebundelde opstellen, Nijmegen, Sun. ISBN 90-6168-193-6
