= Opinion polling for the 2025 Dutch general election =

In the run-up to the 2025 Dutch general election, various organisations carried out opinion polling to gauge voting intentions in the Netherlands. Results of such polls are displayed in this list.

The date range for these opinion polls are from the 2023 Dutch general election, held on 22 November, to the 2025 election. Four main pollsters performed opinion polls on voting intentions in the Netherlands during this period, these being: I&O Research, Ipsos, Peil.nl and Verian. I&O Research and Ipsos merged in January 2024, polling separately until July when they decided to poll together under the name Ipsos I&O. Peil.nl does not give percentages, only showing seats while the other pollsters do include percentages.

== Political polling in the Netherlands ==
The political polling industry in the Netherlands is generally considered reliable. Absolute Total Raw Error in selected past elections has ranged from 11.8% to 16.0%, comparable to the European average. Documented conflicts of interest are rare, although peil.nl has been criticized for underrepresenting certain demographic groups in its samples.

== Projections ==
=== Graphical summary ===
The averages in the graphs below were constructed using polls listed below conducted by the four major Dutch pollsters. The trendlines show local regressions representing seat totals (not vote percentages).

=== Seats ===
There are 150 seats in total, 76 seats are needed for a majority. Parties are denoted with a dash if no indication is given of their level in the polls.

Polling firm	Fieldwork date	Sample size	PVV (Note: Part of the Schoof cabinet until 3 June 2025)	GL/PvdA	VVD (Note: Part of the Schoof cabinet)	NSC (Note: Part of the Schoof cabinet until 22 August 2025)	D66	BBB	CDA	SP	Denk	PvdD	FvD	SGP	CU	Volt	JA21	50+	Lead	Ref
2025 election	29 Oct 2025	–	26	20	22	0	26	4	18	3	3	3	7	3	3	1	9	2	Tie	
Ipsos I&O	29 Oct 2025	–	25	20	23	0	27	4	19	3	3	3	6	3	2	1	9	2	2	
Peil.nl	28 Oct 2025	~8,000	23	23	22	0	22	4	20	4	4	3	7	3	2	2	9	2	Tie	
Verian	27–28 Oct 2025	1,151	29	25	16	0	24	3	19	5	3	2	6	3	3	2	8	2	4	
Ipsos I&O	25–28 Oct 2025	2,505	23	23	17	1	23	5	19	4	3	4	6	3	3	2	11	3	Tie	
Peil.nl	24 Oct 2025	7,500+	29	24	20	0	17	4	22	4	4	3	6	3	2	2	9	1	5	
Ipsos I&O	23–24 Oct 2025	2,745	26	23	16	0	22	4	20	4	3	4	5	3	3	3	12	2	3	
Verian	17–20 Oct 2025	1,473	34	25	15	0	16	2	23	4	3	3	4	3	2	3	12	1	9	
Peil.nl	17 Oct 2025	7,500–	28	24	16	0	17	4	24	4	4	3	6	3	3	2	11	1	4	
Ipsos I&O	13–15 Oct 2025	2,455	29	22	14	0	18	4	25	4	3	4	4	3	3	3	12	2	4	
Verian	10–13 Oct 2025	1,566	31	25	14	0	14	4	23	4	2	3	5	3	3	4	13	2	6	
Peil.nl	10 Oct 2025	7,000+	31	25	15	0	14	4	22	4	4	3	5	3	3	3	13	1	6	
Ipsos I&O	3–6 Oct 2025	2,079	31	22	13	0	14	4	24	4	4	5	4	4	2	4	13	2	7	
Peil.nl	3 Oct 2025	–	30	27	13	0	12	4	23	6	4	3	5	3	3	3	13	1	3	
Verian	26–29 Sep 2025	1,074	34	23	14	0	11	3	23	7	3	4	4	4	4	4	11	1	11	
Ipsos I&O	26–29 Sep 2025	1,935	31	23	14	0	15	5	25	4	4	4	4	3	2	4	11	1	6	
Peil.nl	26 Sep 2025	–	29	27	15	0	11	4	23	6	4	3	5	3	3	3	13	1	2	
Peil.nl	19 Sep 2025	–	29	26	16	0	12	4	22	7	4	3	5	3	3	3	12	1	3	
Ipsos I&O	13–15 Sep 2025	1,920	32	23	14	0	13	4	24	6	4	4	4	3	3	3	12	1	8	
Peil.nl	6 Sep 2025	–	28	28	15	0	10	6	24	7	4	3	5	3	3	3	11	0	Tie	
Ipsos I&O	29 Aug – 1 Sep 2025	1,991	31	23	15	1	11	6	25	6	4	6	3	3	3	4	9	0	6	
	1 Sep 2025	Eddy van Hijum is chosen as lead candidate of NSC																		
	30 Aug 2025	Lidewij de Vos succeeds Thierry Baudet as lead candidate of FvD																		
Verian	22–25 Aug 2025	1,574	33	26	15	0	10	4	22	7	4	4	4	3	5	4	9	0	7	
Peil.nl	25 Aug 2025	6,000	30	29	15	0	10	7	22	7	4	3	4	4	3	3	9	0	1	
	22 Aug 2025	NSC leaves the government coalition																		
Peil.nl	8–9 Aug 2025	–	28	28	16	0	11	6	24	8	4	4	4	4	3	3	7	0	Tie	
Ipsos I&O	25–28 Jul 2025	1,735	27	24	20	1	12	4	24	6	4	6	3	4	4	4	7	0	3	
Verian	25–28 Jul 2025	1,505	30	29	23	1	10	2	23	7	2	4	4	3	3	2	7	0	1	
Peil.nl	26 Jul 2025	–	29	27	19	0	10	5	21	8	4	5	4	4	3	3	8	0	2	
Peil.nl	5 Jul 2025	–	29	28	20	0	9	4	21	7	4	4	4	4	3	3	10	0	1	
Verian	20–23 Jun 2025	1,796	32	26	26	1	8	3	20	5	3	4	3	3	3	4	9	0	6	
Peil.nl	20–21 Jun 2025	–	30	29	22	0	8	3	21	7	4	4	4	4	3	3	8	0	1	
Ipsos I&O	13–16 Jun 2025	1,969	30	29	24	2	11	4	21	5	3	6	3	3	3	3	3	0	1	
Verian	6–9 Jun 2025	1,594	33	25	26	1	10	3	20	6	4	5	3	3	5	4	2	0	7	
Peil.nl	6–7 Jun 2025	–	31	30	24	1	8	2	19	7	4	4	4	4	3	4	5	0	1	
Ipsos I&O	5–6 Jun 2025	1,957	30	26	23	2	12	4	18	5	3	8	5	4	3	3	4	0	4	
	3 Jun 2025	PVV leaves government coalition, and the Schoof cabinet becomes demissionary																		
Peil.nl	31 May 2025	–	31	30	25	1	8	2	18	7	4	4	5	4	3	4	4	0	1	
Verian	23–26 May 2025	1,567	28	28	30	2	10	2	18	8	4	5	3	3	3	3	3	0	2	
Ipsos I&O	9–12 May 2025	1,877	29	28	26	1	12	4	17	6	4	6	4	3	3	3	4	0	1	
Verian	25–28 Apr 2025	1,574	29	27	28	1	12	3	18	6	4	5	4	3	5	3	2	0	1	
Peil.nl	25–26 Apr 2025	–	28	29	26	1	8	3	19	8	4	4	5	4	3	4	4	0	1	
	18 Apr 2025	Nicolien van Vroonhoven succeeds Pieter Omtzigt as NSC leader																		
Ipsos I&O	11–14 Apr 2025	1,990	28	27	26	2	10	5	18	6	4	7	4	3	3	4	4	0	1	
Peil.nl	4 Apr 2025	–	29	29	25	2	9	3	19	7	4	4	5	4	3	3	4	0	Tie	
Peil.nl	29 Mar 2025	–	29	28	26	2	9	3	18	7	4	4	5	4	3	4	4	0	1	
Verian	21–24 Mar 2025	1,564	31	27	28	2	10	2	15	8	4	5	4	4	4	4	2	0	3	
Ipsos I&O	14–17 Mar 2025	2,127	30	27	25	2	11	3	18	6	4	7	3	3	4	3	4	0	3	
Peil.nl	7–8 Mar 2025	–	30	27	23	3	11	4	18	7	4	4	5	4	3	4	3	0	3	
Verian	21–24 Feb 2025	1,578	34	27	24	2	13	4	14	8	3	5	2	4	4	4	2	0	7	
Peil.nl	21–22 Feb 2025	–	32	24	21	3	12	4	17	8	4	5	5	4	4	4	3	0	8	
Ipsos I&O	14–17 Feb 2025	2,382	34	24	20	3	11	4	16	8	3	8	4	4	3	5	3	0	10	
Verian	24–27 Jan 2025	1,556	38	24	22	3	11	4	16	7	3	5	4	3	3	5	2	0	14	
Peil.nl	24–25 Jan 2025	–	34	24	21	3	12	5	16	7	4	5	5	4	4	4	2	0	10	
Ipsos I&O	17–20 Jan 2025	2,267	35	24	21	2	13	6	16	7	5	6	3	3	3	4	2	0	11	
Verian	24–28 Dec 2024	1,583	38	26	23	2	10	4	16	6	4	5	4	2	3	5	2	0	12	
Peil.nl	13–14 Dec 2024	–	35	25	20	3	11	6	15	7	4	5	5	4	4	4	2	0	10	
Ipsos I&O	6–9 Dec 2024	1,925	37	23	22	3	13	5	14	7	4	7	3	3	3	4	2	0	14	
Verian	22–25 Nov 2024	1,551	41	26	22	3	11	5	13	7	3	5	3	3	4	3	1	0	15	
Peil.nl	22–23 Nov 2024	–	38	25	19	3	11	7	14	6	4	4	5	4	4	4	2	0	13	
Ipsos I&O	9–11 Nov 2024	2,020	38	26	22	3	12	5	12	8	4	7	3	3	3	3	1	0	12	
Peil.nl	8–9 Nov 2024	–	38	25	19	4	11	7	13	6	4	4	5	4	4	4	2	0	13	
Verian	25–28 Oct 2024	1,604	39	24	23	4	10	7	12	6	4	7	3	3	4	3	1	0	15	
Ipsos I&O	18–21 Oct 2024	2,143	38	25	21	4	11	5	11	7	3	8	4	3	4	4	2	0	13	
Peil.nl	11–12 Oct 2024	–	37	26	20	4	11	7	13	6	4	4	4	4	4	4	2	0	11	
Peil.nl	27–28 Sep 2024	–	40	26	19	5	11	7	12	5	4	4	4	4	4	4	1	0	14	
Ipsos I&O	20–23 Sep 2024	1,950	41	25	18	6	10	5	11	5	4	7	4	3	4	5	2	0	16	
Verian	20–23 Sep 2024	1,607	41	27	23	3	9	7	10	6	3	5	4	3	4	4	1	0	14	
Ipsos I&O	13–16 Sep 2024	2,208	42	24	20	7	11	5	10	6	3	6	5	2	4	4	1	0	18	
Peil.nl	13–14 Sep 2024	5,000+	38	26	20	7	11	7	11	6	4	4	3	4	4	4	1	0	12	
Verian	23–26 Aug 2024	1,594	39	27	23	9	11	6	8	7	4	4	3	3	3	3	0	0	12	
Ipsos	26–29 Jul 2024	1,016	40	27	21	11	10	8	9	3	4	5	3	3	2	3	1	0	13	
Peil.nl	5–6 Jul 2024	–	38	25	19	8	11	8	11	6	4	4	3	4	4	4	1	0	13	
	2 Jul 2024	The Schoof cabinet is sworn in																		
Peil.nl	28–29 Jun 2024	–	41	26	17	8	10	8	11	6	4	4	3	4	3	4	1	0	15	
Ipsos	21–24 Jun 2024	1,017	44	27	20	12	12	6	6	3	3	5	3	3	2	3	1	0	17	
I&O Research	14–17 Jun 2024	1,979	42	27	18	7	11	7	9	5	3	7	3	4	3	4	0	0	15	
	6 Jun 2024	2024 European Parliament election in the Netherlands																		
Peil.nl	5–6 Jun 2024	–	43	25	19	8	10	8	10	5	3	4	4	3	3	4	1	0	18	
Peil.nl	31 May – 1 Jun 2024	–	42	25	19	7	10	8	10	6	3	4	5	3	3	4	1	0	17	
Ipsos	24–27 May 2024	2,048	48	24	19	11	10	7	6	3	3	6	3	3	3	3	1	0	24	
I&O Research	17–21 May 2024	2,141	46	26	17	8	10	7	7	5	3	5	3	4	4	4	1	0	20	
Peil.nl	17–18 May 2024	–	45	25	18	7	10	8	10	6	3	4	4	3	3	3	1	0	20	
I&O Research	9–12 May 2024	1,839	47	26	18	8	10	6	7	5	2	5	3	4	4	4	1	0	21	
Peil.nl	3–4 May 2024	–	46	25	17	8	10	8	9	7	3	3	4	3	3	3	1	0	21	
Ipsos	26–29 Apr 2024	1,011	45	23	20	11	11	8	5	4	4	5	4	4	3	2	1	0	22	
Peil.nl	19 Apr 2024	8,500	50	25	15	8	10	7	9	7	3	3	3	3	3	3	1	0	25	
Ipsos	22–25 Mar 2024	1,016	49	24	20	11	10	6	6	4	3	4	3	3	3	2	2	0	25	
Peil.nl	22 Mar 2024	–	49	25	15	9	10	7	9	7	3	3	3	3	3	3	1	0	24	
Peil.nl	8 Mar 2024	–	49	25	15	10	10	7	9	7	3	3	3	3	3	2	1	0	24	
Ipsos	23–26 Feb 2024	1,022	49	25	19	11	11	8	6	3	4	4	3	3	2	1	1	0	24	
I&O Research	9–12 Feb 2024	2,752	49	25	17	9	9	7	7	5	2	5	3	4	3	4	1	0	24	
Peil.nl	9 Feb 2024	6,000	52	25	13	11	10	8	8	6	3	3	3	3	3	2	0	0	27	
Peil.nl	2–3 Feb 2024	4,500+	50	25	13	15	10	7	7	6	3	3	3	3	3	2	0	0	25	
Ipsos	26–29 Jan 2024	1,025	45	25	19	18	11	6	5	3	3	4	3	3	2	2	1	0	20	
Peil.nl	19–20 Jan 2024	5,500+	49	23	12	17	10	9	6	6	3	3	3	3	3	3	0	0	26	
Peil.nl	22 Dec 2023	–	48	22	13	18	11	9	6	5	3	3	3	3	3	3	0	0	26	
Ipsos	15–18 Dec 2023	1,052	47	22	18	19	9	8	4	3	4	5	3	3	3	2	0	0	25	
	13 Dec 2023	Jimmy Dijk succeeds Lilian Marijnissen as SP leader																		
I&O Research	8–11 Dec 2023	2,952	43	23	16	20	10	8	5	5	2	5	3	3	3	4	0	0	20	
Peil.nl	1–2 Dec 2023	–	42	22	16	19	11	10	6	5	3	3	3	3	3	3	1	0	20	
2023 election	22 Nov 2023	–	37	25	24	20	9	7	5	5	3	3	3	3	3	2	1	0	12	

*: Exit poll.

=== Vote share ===
Polling firm	Fieldwork date	Sample size	PVV	GL/PvdA	VVD	NSC	D66	BBB	CDA	SP	Denk	PvdD	FvD	SGP	CU	Volt	JA21	50+	Others	Lead	Ref
2025 election	29 Oct 2025	–	16.7%	12.8%	14.2%	0.4%	16.9%	2.6%	11.8%	1.9%	2.4%	2.1%	4.5%	2.3%	1.9%	1.1%	5.9%	1.4%	1.1%	0.2%	
Verian	27–28 Oct 2025	1,070	18.5%	15.9%	10.3%	0.3%	15.8%	2.4%	12.4%	3.5%	2.3%	1.6%	3.9%	2.0%	2.0%	1.5%	5.7%	1.8%	–	2.6%	
Ipsos I&O	25–28 Oct 2025	2,505	14.8%	15.0%	10.9%	0.7%	15.4%	3.2%	12.7%	2.7%	2.3%	2.6%	4.0%	2.4%	2.2%	1.6%	7.4%	2.1%	–	0.4%	
Ipsos I&O	23–24 Oct 2025	2,745	16.7%	15.0%	10.4%	0.5%	14.4%	2.7%	12.6%	2.8%	2.4%	3.0%	3.6%	2.5%	2.2%	2.2%	7.7%	1.3%	–	1.7%	
Ipsos I&O	13–15 Oct 2025	2,455	18.5%	13.8%	8.8%	0.7%	11.7%	2.9%	15.9%	3.0%	2.4%	3.1%	3.1%	2.3%	2.3%	2.1%	7.9%	1.6%	–	2.6%	
Ipsos I&O	3–6 Oct 2025	2,079	20.2%	14.0%	8.5%	0.6%	9.3%	2.6%	15.7%	2.6%	3.0%	3.6%	2.9%	2.6%	1.9%	3.0%	8.2%	1.3%	–	4.5%	
Verian	26–29 Sep 2025	1,074	22.0%	14.6%	9.3%	0.4%	7.1%	2.4%	15.3%	4.5%	2.0%	3.1%	3.0%	2.8%	2.6%	2.9%	7.3%	1.0%	–	6.7%	
Ipsos I&O	26–29 Sep 2025	1,935	19.8%	14.8%	9.3%	0.4%	9.9%	3.6%	15.5%	2.9%	2.7%	2.8%	3.1%	2.5%	1.8%	2.7%	7.3%	0.8%	–	4.3%	
Ipsos I&O	13–15 Sep 2025	1,920	19.9%	14.6%	9.2%	0.2%	8.5%	2.7%	15.3%	4.0%	2.8%	3.0%	2.8%	2.2%	2.4%	2.3%	8.0%	1.0%	–	4.6%	
Ipsos I&O	29 Aug – 1 Sep 2025	1,991	19.5%	14.8%	9.7%	0.7%	7.4%	4.1%	16.1%	4.3%	2.6%	3.8%	2.0%	2.0%	2.3%	2.9%	6.1%	–	–	3.4%	
Verian	22–25 Aug 2025	1,432	21.1%	16.9%	9.9%	0.4%	6.9%	2.7%	14.6%	5.0%	2.6%	3.1%	2.7%	2.1%	3.5%	2.6%	6.1%	–	–	4.2%	
Ipsos I&O	25–28 Jul 2025	1,735	17.4%	15.2%	12.6%	1.2%	8.1%	3.0%	15.1%	4.0%	2.9%	3.8%	2.1%	2.6%	2.6%	2.5%	4.9%	–	–	2.2%	
Verian	25–28 Jul 2025	1,505	19.7%	18.4%	15.0%	0.9%	6.4%	1.7%	14.6%	4.6%	1.9%	2.8%	2.8%	2.3%	2.5%	1.3%	5.1%	–	–	1.3%	
Verian	20–23 Jun 2025	1,796	20.8%	16.9%	16.5%	0.8%	5.3%	2.1%	13.3%	3.2%	2.2%	3.0%	2.3%	2.3%	2.2%	3.0%	6.2%	–	–	4.1%	
Ipsos I&O	13–16 Jun 2025	1,969	19.2%	18.3%	15.4%	1.3%	7.2%	2.8%	13.6%	3.6%	2.4%	4.1%	2.2%	2.5%	2.2%	2.3%	2.4%	–	–	0.9%	
Ipsos I&O	5–6 Jun 2025	1,957	19.0%	16.7%	14.8%	1.7%	8.2%	2.6%	11.8%	3.5%	2.3%	5.2%	3.2%	2.6%	2.2%	2.4%	2.8%	–	–	2.3%	
Verian	23–26 May 2025	1,567	18.4%	17.9%	19.4%	1.5%	6.6%	1.9%	11.9%	5.1%	3.0%	3.2%	2.0%	2.3%	2.4%	2.2%	2.2%	–	–	1.0%	
Ipsos I&O	9–12 May 2025	1,877	18.3%	18.1%	16.7%	1.2%	7.7%	2.6%	11.1%	4.0%	2.5%	4.4%	2.8%	2.5%	2.4%	2.3%	2.6%	–	–	0.2%	
Verian	25–28 Apr 2025	1,574	18.8%	17.3%	18.1%	0.8%	7.8%	2.4%	12.2%	4.1%	2.7%	3.4%	3.0%	2.5%	3.2%	2.2%	1.4%	–	–	0.7%	
Ipsos I&O	11–14 Apr 2025	1,990	17.9%	16.8%	16.4%	1.3%	6.7%	3.5%	11.7%	3.6%	2.9%	4.6%	3.0%	2.1%	2.3%	2.5%	2.7%	–	–	1.1%	
Verian	21–24 Mar 2025	1,564	19.9%	17.4%	18.2%	1.8%	6.4%	1.6%	9.6%	5.7%	3.1%	3.7%	3.1%	2.8%	2.6%	2.8%	1.5%	–	–	1.7%	
Ipsos I&O	14–17 Mar 2025	2,382	19.2%	16.9%	15.5%	1.7%	7.2%	2.3%	11.2%	4.3%	3.1%	4.3%	2.4%	2.2%	2.6%	2.3%	2.7%	–	–	2.3%	
Verian	21–24 Feb 2025	1,578	21.9%	17.4%	15.3%	1.7%	8.4%	2.6%	9.5%	5.6%	2.5%	3.4%	1.7%	2.9%	2.9%	2.8%	1.5%	–	–	4.5%	
Ipsos I&O	14–17 Feb 2025	2,382	21.9%	15.4%	12.6%	2.1%	6.9%	2.9%	10.1%	5.1%	2.2%	5.6%	2.8%	2.6%	2.2%	3.1%	1.9%	–	–	6.5%	
Verian	24–27 Jan 2025	1,556	24.2%	15.8%	14.4%	2.2%	7.3%	3.0%	10.2%	4.5%	2.5%	3.5%	2.7%	2.3%	2.4%	3.5%	1.6%	–	–	8.2%	
Ipsos I&O	17–20 Jan 2025	2,267	22.0%	15.5%	13.4%	1.9%	8.2%	3.8%	10.1%	4.6%	3.2%	4.3%	2.2%	2.4%	2.5%	2.6%	1.7%	–	–	6.5%	
Verian	24–28 Dec 2024	1,583	24.3%	16.9%	15.3%	1.8%	6.8%	3.1%	10.4%	4.0%	2.8%	3.5%	2.6%	1.7%	2.3%	3.3%	1.3%	–	–	7.4%	
Ipsos I&O	6–9 Dec 2024	1,925	23.2%	14.2%	14.1%	2.1%	8.7%	3.3%	8.7%	4.5%	2.5%	4.9%	2.1%	2.1%	2.3%	2.8%	1.5%	–	–	9.0%	
Verian	22–25 Nov 2024	1,551	26.5%	16.9%	14.4%	2.2%	7.1%	3.8%	8.5%	4.5%	2.1%	3.5%	2.4%	2.2%	3.0%	2.0%	0.9%	–	–	9.6%	
Ipsos I&O	9–11 Nov 2024	2,020	23.7%	16.2%	13.9%	2.3%	7.6%	3.7%	7.3%	5.2%	2.7%	4.8%	2.3%	2.2%	2.4%	2.2%	0.8%	–	–	7.5%	
Verian	25–28 Oct 2024	1,604	25.6%	15.5%	14.7%	2.8%	6.9%	4.6%	7.8%	3.9%	3.1%	5.0%	2.2%	2.2%	2.8%	2.1%	1.0%	–	–	10.1%	
Ipsos I&O	18–21 Oct 2024	2,143	24.8%	16.7%	13.5%	2.7%	7.3%	3.6%	7.1%	4.8%	2.4%	5.2%	2.9%	2.1%	2.9%	2.6%	1.4%	–	–	8.1%	
Ipsos I&O	20–23 Sep 2024	1,950	25.9%	16.1%	11.8%	4.0%	6.9%	3.8%	7.4%	3.8%	2.6%	5.0%	3.0%	2.3%	2.5%	3.4%	1.4%	–	–	9.8%	
Verian	20–23 Sep 2024	1,607	26.7%	17.5%	15.0%	2.0%	5.9%	4.9%	7.0%	4.1%	2.2%	3.6%	2.6%	2.1%	2.8%	2.8%	0.8%	–	–	9.2%	
Ipsos I&O	13–16 Sep 2024	2,208	27.0%	15.7%	13.2%	4.4%	7.4%	3.8%	6.2%	4.4%	2.1%	4.3%	3.1%	1.8%	2.8%	3.0%	0.7%	–	–	11.3%	
Verian	23–26 Aug 2024	1,594	24.9%	17.5%	15.0%	5.9%	7.3%	3.8%	5.6%	4.4%	2.8%	3.0%	2.2%	2.2%	2.3%	2.5%	0.5%	–	–	7.4%	
Ipsos	26–29 Jul 2024	1,016	25.8%	17.3%	13.4%	7.3%	6.5%	5.2%	5.7%	2.2%	2.7%	3.6%	2.3%	2.2%	1.8%	2.2%	0.8%	–	0.9%	8.5%	
Ipsos	21–24 Jun 2024	1,017	27.7%	17.3%	13.1%	7.7%	7.8%	3.8%	4.4%	2.5%	2.3%	3.2%	2.3%	2.3%	1.8%	1.9%	1.2%	–	0.7%	10.4%	
I&O Research	14–17 Jun 2024	1,979	27.3%	17.6%	12.0%	4.6%	7.4%	4.8%	6.3%	3.2%	1.9%	4.5%	2.0%	2.6%	2.5%	2.7%	0.6%	–	0.6%	9.7%	
EP elections	6 Jun 2024	–	17.0%	21.1%	11.4%	3.8%	8.4%	5.4%	9.5%	2.2%	–	4.5%	2.5%	3.7%	2.9%	5.1%	0.7%	0.9%	2.0%	4.1%	
Peil.nl	5–6 Jun 2024	–	26.7%	16.0%	12.3%	5.2%	6.6%	5.3%	6.6%	3.4%	2.2%	3.2%	2.8%	2.4%	2.0%	2.7%	1.0%	–	1.6%	10.7%	
Ipsos	24–27 May 2024	2,048	30.5%	15.2%	12.1%	7.2%	6.8%	5.0%	4.1%	2.4%	2.4%	4.2%	2.4%	2.2%	1.9%	2.0%	0.9%	–	0.6%	15.3%	
I&O Research	17–21 May 2024	2,141	29.6%	16.6%	11.5%	5.7%	6.7%	4.6%	4.8%	3.5%	2.0%	3.3%	2.2%	2.8%	2.7%	2.8%	0.8%	–	0.3%	14.0%	
I&O Research	9–12 May 2024	1,839	30.0%	16.7%	11.8%	5.1%	6.4%	4.1%	4.9%	3.6%	1.8%	3.7%	2.5%	2.6%	2.6%	3.1%	0.8%	–	0.3%	14.5%	
Ipsos	26–29 Apr 2024	1,011	28.7%	14.7%	12.7%	7.4%	6.9%	5.5%	3.6%	2.9%	2.8%	3.6%	2.8%	2.8%	1.9%	1.6%	1.2%	–	0.9%	14.0%	
Ipsos	22–25 Mar 2024	1,016	31.1%	15.6%	12.6%	7.0%	6.6%	4.2%	4.1%	2.8%	2.3%	3.1%	2.3%	2.1%	2.3%	1.7%	1.3%	–	0.8%	15.5%	
Ipsos	23–26 Feb 2024	1,022	31.1%	15.9%	12.4%	7.0%	7.0%	5.4%	4.3%	2.2%	3.1%	2.9%	2.1%	2.4%	1.5%	1.1%	0.8%	–	0.6%	15.2%	
I&O Research	9–12 Feb 2024	2,752	31.0%	16.5%	11.1%	6.3%	6.3%	4.5%	4.5%	3.2%	1.8%	3.2%	2.2%	2.6%	2.5%	3.0%	0.7%	–	0.6%	14.5%	
Ipsos	26–29 Jan 2024	1,025	28.4%	16.0%	12.2%	11.9%	6.9%	4.2%	3.4%	2.4%	2.5%	3.0%	2.1%	2.2%	1.7%	1.7%	0.9%	–	0.5%	12.4%	
Ipsos	15–18 Dec 2023	1,052	29.8%	13.8%	11.5%	12.4%	6.1%	5.1%	2.6%	2.5%	3.1%	3.3%	1.9%	2.3%	1.9%	1.8%	0.6%	–	1.3%	16.0%	
I&O Research	8–11 Dec 2023	2,952	27.4%	14.6%	10.4%	12.5%	6.6%	5.5%	3.4%	3.6%	1.8%	3.3%	2.2%	2.3%	2.2%	2.9%	0.6%	–	0.7%	12.8%	
2023 election	22 Nov 2023	–	23.5%	15.5%	15.1%	12.8%	6.3%	4.6%	3.3%	3.1%	2.3%	2.2%	2.2%	2.1%	2.0%	1.7%	0.7%	0.5%	1.1%	8.0%	

=== Specific samples ===
==== Muslim voters ====
The following poll sampled just Muslim voters in the Netherlands.

Polling firm	Fieldwork date	Sample size	GL/PvdA	SP	Denk	PvdD	Others/Don't Know	Lead	Ref
Het Opiniehuis	16–19 Nov 2024	970	12%	5%	64%	4%	16%	52%	

==== Bi-cultural voters ====
The following poll sampled just Dutch voters with a bicultural background.

Polling firm	Fieldwork date	Sample size	PVV	GL/PvdA	VVD	D66	CDA	SP	Denk	PvdD	CU	Volt	JA21	BIJ1	Others	Don't Know	Lead	Ref
Het Opiniehuis	26 Sep – 5 Oct 2025	1,007	3%	18%	3%	3%	1%	2%	32%	11%	1%	2%	1%	3%	–	19%	14%	

==== Voters in Limburg ====
The following poll sampled just Dutch voters in the province of Limburg.

Polling firm	Fieldwork date	Sample size	PVV	GL/PvdA	VVD	NSC	D66	BBB	CDA	SP	Denk	PvdD	FvD	SGP	CU	Volt	JA21	50+	Others	Lead	Ref
2025 election	29 Oct 2025	–	25.6%	10.5%	14.0%	0.4%	14.0%	2.6%	13.3%	2.0%	1.2%	1.5%	4.8%	0.1%	0.4%	0.8%	6.1%	1.9%	1.2%	11.6%	
Peil.nl	24 Oct 2025	–	28.3%	14.1%	9.6%	0.3%	10.3%	4.0%	13.8%	3.3%	1.2%	1.5%	4.5%	0.1%	0.3%	0.9%	5.8%	0.9%	1.1%	14.2%	
EP elections	6 Jun 2024	–	24.4%	17.1%	10.1%	3.8%	6.8%	5.1%	16.0%	2.5%	–	3.6%	2.9%	0.2%	0.5%	3.7%	0.6%	1.7%	1.1%	7.3%	
2023 election	22 Nov 2023	–	33.3%	13.5%	13.8%	14.1%	4.8%	4.4%	3.4%	3.7%	1.2%	1.7%	2.3%	0.1%	0.3%	1.0%	0.6%	0.6%	1.1%	19.2%	

==== Voters in North Brabant ====
The following poll sampled just Dutch voters in the province of North Brabant.

Polling firm	Fieldwork date	Sample size	PVV	GL/PvdA	VVD	NSC	D66	BBB	CDA	SP	Denk	PvdD	FvD	SGP	CU	Volt	JA21	50+	Others	Lead	Ref
2025 election	29 Oct 2025	–	19.1%	10.1%	16.7%	0.3%	17.8%	2.4%	13.0%	1.9%	1.8%	1.5%	4.0%	0.5%	0.6%	1.0%	6.7%	1.8%	2.9%	1.3%	
Peil.nl	24 Oct 2025	–	20.2%	12.1%	14.4%	0.3%	12.6%	4.0%	14.5%	3.6%	1.8%	1.6%	4.2%	0.4%	0.5%	1.4%	6.4%	1.0%	–	5.7%	
EP elections	6 Jun 2024	–	19.4%	19.1%	13.7%	3.6%	8.9%	5.3%	11.6%	2.7%	–	3.6%	2.3%	0.9%	0.9%	5.0%	0.6%	1.5%	1.0%	0.3%	
2023 election	22 Nov 2023	–	26.9%	13.0%	18.1%	12.8%	6.6%	4.4%	3.5%	4.1%	1.8%	1.8%	1.9%	0.4%	0.6%	1.6%	0.7%	0.6%	1.6%	8.8%	

==== Voters in Zeeland ====
The following poll sampled just Dutch voters in the province of Zeeland.

Polling firm	Fieldwork date	Sample size	PVV	GL/PvdA	VVD	NSC	D66	BBB	CDA	SP	Denk	PvdD	FvD	SGP	CU	Volt	JA21	50+	Others	Lead	Ref
2025 election	29 Oct 2025	–	17.6%	9.1%	13.6%	0.3%	12.0%	3.1%	13.3%	1.7%	0.8%	1.3%	5.2%	10.2%	2.7%	0.6%	6.1%	1.6%	0.7%	4.0%	
Peil.nl	24 Oct 2025	–	18.1%	9.9%	10.4%	–	8.9%	5.0%	16.8%	–	–	–	5.1%	–	–	–	6.3%	–	–	1.3%	
EP elections	6 Jun 2024	–	16.9%	15.0%	10.1%	3.0%	5.0%	8.0%	10.6%	2.0%	–	3.1%	2.7%	15.5%	3.5%	2.4%	0.6%	1.0%	1.0%	1.4%	
2023 election	22 Nov 2023	–	23.9%	11.1%	14.7%	12.2%	4.1%	5.9%	4.3%	3.1%	0.8%	1.8%	2.5%	9.7%	2.9%	0.7%	0.7%	0.6%	1.1%	9.2%	

==== Voters in Groningen ====
The following poll sampled just Dutch voters in the city of Groningen.

Polling firm	Fieldwork date	Sample size	PVV	GL/PvdA	VVD	NSC	D66	BBB	CDA	SP	Denk	PvdD	FvD	SGP	CU	Volt	JA21	50+	Others	Lead	Ref
2025 election	29 Oct 2025	–	8.4%	24.0%	10.3%	0.4%	24.4%	1.2%	8.6%	4.6%	0.8%	4.0%	3.0%	0.6%	2.2%	2.1%	3.5%	0.8%	0.9%	0.4%	
OOG	15–20 Oct 2025	2,180	11.4%	26.8%	4.3%	0.3%	12.5%	1.7%	8.0%	8.3%	0.3%	5.0%	2.7%	0.6%	1.7%	3.2%	3.6%	–	–	14.3%	
EP elections	6 Jun 2024	–	7.3%	36.1%	7.9%	2.8%	11.4%	1.8%	5.3%	3.5%	–	7.9%	1.8%	0.9%	3.2%	8.0%	0.5%	0.4%	1.1%	24.7%	
2023 election	22 Nov 2023	–	13.2%	30.5%	10.6%	11.6%	9.0%	2.3%	2.1%	4.3%	0.9%	4.1%	2.0%	0.5%	2.6%	3.8%	0.7%	0.3%	1.5%	17.3%	

== See also ==
- Opinion polling for the 2017 Dutch general election
- Opinion polling for the 2021 Dutch general election
- Opinion polling for the 2023 Dutch general election
