= League of Dutch Marxist–Leninists =

League of Dutch Marxist–Leninists (Dutch: Bond van Nederlandse Marxisten-Leninisten) was a communist organisation in the Netherlands.

By the time of the 21st party congress of the Communist Party of the Netherlands in 1964, two pro-China fractions existed inside the party. One was the Marxist-Leninist Centre in Rotterdam. The other was a group based in Amsterdam which published the periodical Rode Vlag (Red Flag). The Rode Vlag-group was led by Chris Bischot, a district level leader of CPN. In December 1964, Bischot was expelled from CPN, along with the leaders of MLC.

Initially, there were talks on a merger between the two dissident communist factions. Such plans could not develop further, mainly because of the perception held by the Rode Vlag-group that the CPN could still be converted into a revolutionary party.

In 1966, the Rode Vlag-group started another periodical, Rode Jeugd (Red Youth). Through Rode Jeugd. Through the militant messages given in Rode Jeugd, the group expanded. It gained supporters in IJmuiden, Kampen, Eindhoven, The Hague and Rotterdam.

But Rode Jeugd would also give problems to the Rode Vlag-group. A clash of generations erupted, and in October 1967 the Rode Jeugd-group broke away and formed a separate organization called Rode Jeugd.

In 1969, the group around Rode Vlag constituted BNML. By this time they had completely left the ambition to reform the CPN. Rode Vlag became the central organ of BNML. BNML also started Rood Metal (Red Metal) as a periodical of workers.

By 1970, BVD estimated the BNML membership to around 40. The real figure was probably significantly higher.

In 1972, BNML was joined by the Red Youth (marxist-leninist), which had broken away from Rode Jeugd.

Bischot died in 1973.

In the mid-1970s, BNML played an important role in conducting debates on a possible merger of the various marxist-leninist factions. Excluded from the talks were the Socialist Party (who had moved away from the Maoist orthodoxy), Red Youth (which had developed into a terroristic orientation) and the Marxist-Leninist Party of the Netherlands (which was in reality, a BVD proxy). Thus the remaining organizations were the Communist Unity Movement of the Netherlands (marxist-leninist) (KEN(ml)), the Group of Marxist-Leninists/Red Dawn (GML), the Communist Circle of Breda (marxist-leninist) (KKB(ml)) and the Communist Workers Organisation (KAO). GML excluded itself from the process due to their rejection of unity with KEN(ml), and KEN(ml) could not arrive at a comprise with the other groups due to their persistence on claiming hegemony over the other factions. In 197,8 BNML merged with KAO and KKB(ml) to form the Communist Workers Organisation (marxist-leninist) (KAO(ml)).
