= Chris Petersen (disambiguation) =

Chris Petersen (born 1964) is a former American college football coach.

Chris Petersen or Christopher Petersen may also refer to:

- Chris Petersen (baseball) (born 1970), American baseball player
- Chris Petersen (born 1983), American guitarist for metal band Cellador
- Pseudonym of Pieter Boevé

== See also ==
- Christopher Peterson (disambiguation)
