= Red Youth =

Red Youth may refer to:

- Red Youth (Norway)
- Red Youth (Netherlands)
- Red Youth (Marxist–Leninist)
