= Nico Schrevel =

Dutch politician

Nico Schrevel (1933–2000) was a Dutch political activist.

Schrevel grew up in a Dutch Reformed family. He was active in the youth organization of the Labour Party. In the early 1960s he was active in the Communist Party of the Netherlands (CPN) in Rotterdam as department secretary, but was expelled from this party in 1966, together with Daan Monjé, because of open Maoist sympathies. Via the Marxist–Leninist Center (MLC), which they founded during their CPN membership, renamed Marxist–Leninist Center in the Netherlands (MLCN) in 1965, Schrevel and Monjé tried to influence the CPN and individual members of that party to opt for Maoism. When that failed, from 1967 onward they aimed for the formation of their own Maoist party, the Communist Unity Movement of the Netherlands (Marxist–Leninist) (KPN-ML) founded in 1970.

After an ideological conflict in 1971, the party split, as did the paths of Schrevel and Monjé. Schrevel's group continued as KEN(ml). Monjé and his associates formed the KPN/ML, which would be renamed the Socialist Party a year later. Schrevel did not want to sit on the board of a new party and left both the party and active politics a short time later, after experiencing another schism. He was later the European director of marketing and sales at an American multinational in coatings for film and paper for many years.
