= Hans van Hooft Sr. =

Dutch politician (1941–2026)

Leader of the Socialist Party
- In office 1 October 1986 – 20 May 1988
- Preceded by: Daan Monjé
- Succeeded by: Jan Marijnissen

Chairman of the Socialist Party
- In office 22 October 1971 – 20 May 1988
- Preceded by: Office established
- Succeeded by: Jan Marijnissen

Personal details
- Born: 25 November 1941 Kerkdriel, German-occupied Netherlands
- Died: 17 June 2026 (aged 84) Nijmegen, Netherlands
- Occupation: Politician · Metalworker

Hans van Hooft Sr. (25 November 1941 – 17 June 2026) was a Dutch politician. After serving on the Nijmegen city council for the Socialist Party (SP) from 1976 to 2002, he was an alderman in this city until 2010.

== Career ==
Van Hooft attended the HBS in Nijmegen and studied medicine at the Catholic University of Nijmegen. During his studies he was a member of the Pacifist Socialist Party (PSP) for some time. In 1969 he finished his studies and started working in a factory. In 1971 he obtained a welding diploma.

In 1970 Van Hooft became a member of the Communist Unity Movement of the Netherlands (Marxist–Leninist) (KEN-ML). When this party split in 1971, he was one of the founders of the Communist Party of the Netherlands (Marxist-Leninist) (KPN-ML), the party which would be renamed Socialist Party a year later. Van Hooft was a member of the Nijmegen city council from 1976 to 2002. From its foundation until 1987, Van Hooft was party chairman of the SP. He was also lead candidate in the parliamentary elections of 1981, 1982 and 1986. As chairman and as party leader, Van Hooft was succeeded by Jan Marijnissen in 1988. From 1994 to 2002 he was a political assistant of the SP in the House of Representatives. From 2002 to 2010 he was alderman in Nijmegen with the portfolio of Neighbourhoods, Public Space, Games and Social Relief.

== Personal life and death ==
Hans van Hooft Sr. was the father of Hans van Hooft Jr., who was the SP faction leader in the Nijmegen city council between 2002 and 2024.

Van Hooft died in a hospital in Nijmegen after colon surgery on 17 June 2026, at the age of 84.
