= Communist Workers Organisation =

Communist Workers Organisation may refer to:

- Communist Workers' Organisation (UK), the British section of the Internationalist Communist Tendency
- Communist Workers Organisation (Marxist–Leninist)
- Communist Workers Organisation (Netherlands)
