= BNML =

BNML may refer to:

- Bandai Namco Music Live
- League of Dutch Marxist-Leninists
- Burlington Northern (Manitoba) Ltd.
