= CWO =

CWO may refer to:

- Cadet Warrant Officer, a cadet rank in the British Air Training Corps and the RAF Section of the Combined Cadet Force
- Cadmium tungstate, a scintillator
- Cash With Order, a standard UK commercial term
- Chief Warrant Officer, a non-commissioned rank in the Canadian military
- Chief Warrant Officer, a warrant officer in the United States military in the grade of W-2 or higher.
- Chief Weather Officer
- Chief Web Officer, an executive who is in charge of the web presence for an organisation
- Communist Workers Organisation (disambiguation), one of several organisations
- Completion and Workover, a subsea operation performed on subsea wells
- Conservative Women's Organisation, an organisation within the Conservative Party in the United Kingdom.
- Contingent Workforce Outsourcing
- Corrective Work Order, a penalty for littering in Singapore
