= Christopher Peterson =

Christopher Peterson may refer to:

- Christopher Peterson (psychologist) (1950–2012), American psychology professor
- Christopher Peterson (serial killer) (born 1969), American serial killer
- Christopher Peterson (law professor) (born 1975), American legal scholar and candidate for Utah governor
- Christopher Peterson (costume designer), American costume designer
- Chris Peterson (producer) (born 1968), Canadian music producer
- Chris Peterson (character), the lead character played by Chris Elliot in the 1990s sitcom Get a Life
- Chris Peterson (Nebraska politician) (born 1950) Republican politician

== See also ==
- Chris Petersen (disambiguation)
