= Jan Marijnissen =

Dutch politician (born 1952)

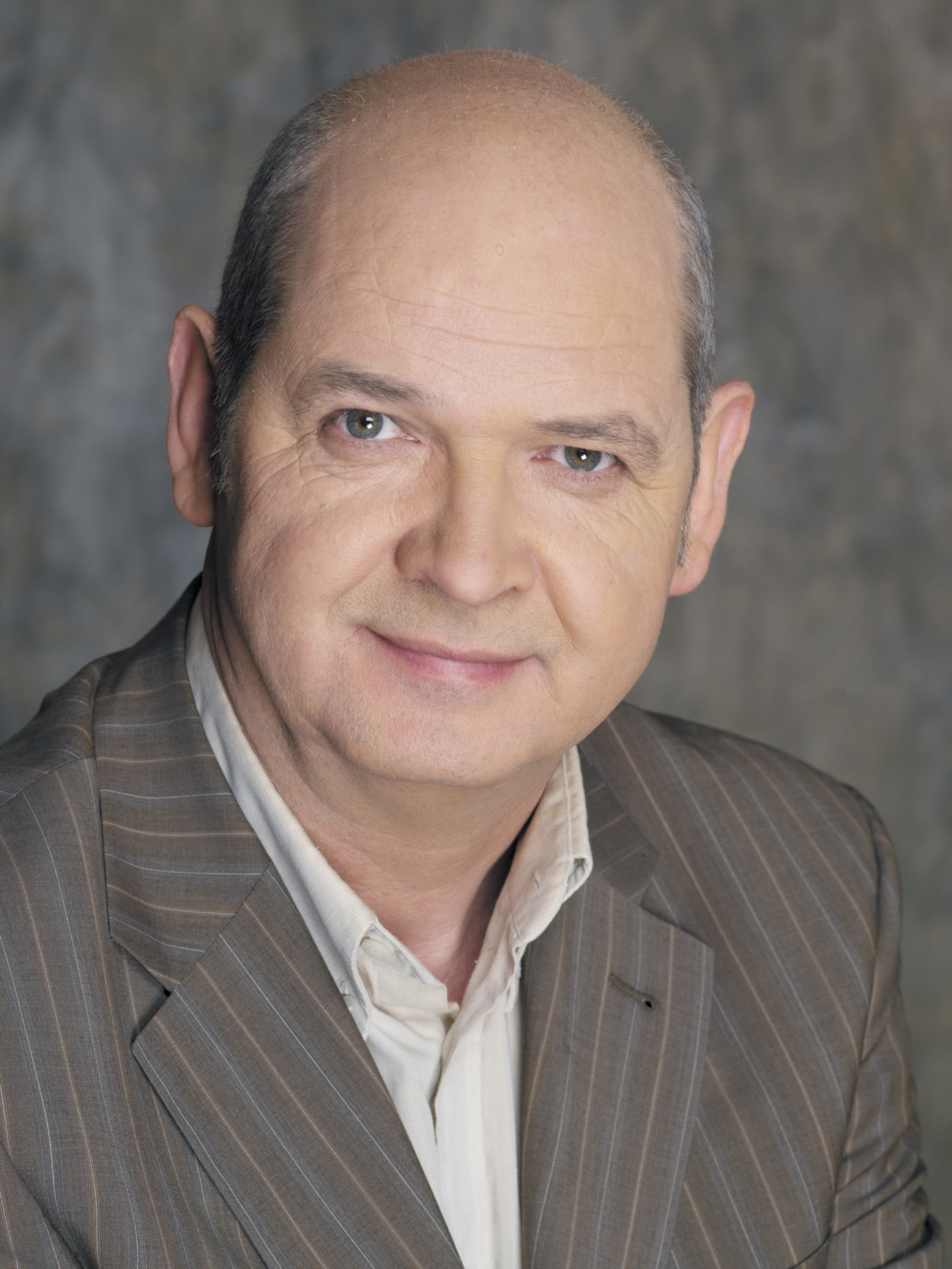
- Official portrait, 2006

Member of the House of Representatives
- In office 17 May 1994 – 17 June 2010
- Parliamentary group: Socialist Party

Parliamentary leader in the House of Representatives
- In office 17 May 1994 – 20 June 2008
- Preceded by: Office established
- Succeeded by: Agnes Kant
- Parliamentary group: Socialist Party

Chairman of the Socialist Party
- In office 20 May 1988 – 28 November 2015
- Preceded by: Hans van Hooft Sr.
- Succeeded by: Ron Meyer

Leader of the Socialist Party
- In office 20 May 1988 – 20 June 2008
- Preceded by: Hans van Hooft Sr. (as Chairman of the Socialist Party)
- Succeeded by: Agnes Kant

Personal details
- Born: Johannes Guillaume Christianus Andreas Marijnissen; 8 October 1952 (age 73) Oss, Netherlands
- Party: Socialist Party (1972–present)
- Other political affiliations: Communist Unity Movement of the Netherlands (1970–1972)
- Spouse: Mari-Anne van Schijndel (m. 1976)
- Children: Lilian Marijnissen
- Occupation: Politician · Welder · Activist · Author · Columnist
- Website: (in Dutch) Official website

Johannes Guillaume Christianus Andreas "Jan" Marijnissen (Jan Marijnissen) (born 8 October 1952) is a Dutch retired politician of the Socialist Party (SP).

Marijnissen, a welder by occupation, was selected as Leader of the Socialist Party after the death of Daan Monjé on 1 October 1986 and became Chairman of the Socialist Party on 20 May 1988. For the election of 1994 Marijnissen was the Lijsttrekker (top candidate) and won two seats in the House of Representatives, the first time the Socialist Party won representation in the States General of the Netherlands. Marijnissen was elected as a Member of the House of Representatives on 17 May 1994 and became the Parliamentary leader of the Socialist Party in the House of Representatives. For the elections of 1998 and 2002 Marijnissen again as Lijsttrekker won three and four seats respectively. For the election of 2006 Marijnissen for the fifth time as Lijsttrekker won sixteen seats and the Socialist Party became the third-largest party in the House of Representatives. On 20 June 2008 Marijnissen announced his retirement as Leader of the Socialist Party and Parliamentary leader of the Socialist Party in the House of Representatives citing health reasons. Marijnissen remained a Member of the House of Representatives until after the 2010 general election. Marijnissen stood down as Chairman of the Socialist Party on 28 November 2015.

He is the father of Lilian Marijnissen, a former Leader of the Socialist Party.

== Early life ==
Johannes Guillaume Christianus Andreas Marijnissen was born on 8 October 1952 in Oss in the Dutch Province of North Brabant in a Roman Catholic family. After leaving secondary school shortly before the exams, he worked in a number of factories in and around Oss. He then trained as a welder, working for ten years in the metal industry.

== Politics ==
=== Local politics ===
Meanwhile, he helped founding the SP in Oss and, in 1975, became the Netherlands' youngest councillor ever. He remained a councillor until 1993, playing a leading role in many campaigns, such as against polluting discharges. The SP's council representation in Oss has grown at every local election and is, as of 2005, the biggest stronghold of the Socialist Party in the Netherlands. Nicknamed "The Wizard of Oss", after his hometown, he became famous when he turned out to be one of the main architects of the Dutch vote that rejected the European Constitution in June 2005.

In 1987 Marijnissen became the party's first ever provincial assembly member, in North Brabant. A year later he became the SP's national president. Under his leadership the party was transformed from "a federation of local branches" into a party with a clear national programme, nationally organised activities and a national profile.

=== National politics ===
Beginning in 1994, when the SP made the breakthrough which brought it into the House of Representatives, Marijnissen was chairman of the party's parliamentary group. After gaining two out of the 150 parliamentary seats during this first breakthrough, support for him and his party rose slowly but continuously. After four years in parliament, his Socialist Party went under his lead from two to five seats during the national elections of 1998, which was followed by a growth towards nine seats in 2002.

In 2003, after the 87-day term of Balkenende I, the Socialist Party did not manage to gain more seats than the year before and stayed at the same level with again 9 out of 150 seats. Although there was a slight rise in the number of people who voted for the SP compared to a year before, a few weeks before the elections the polls suggested the SP might double.

After the 2004 elections a conflict arose between Jan Marijnissen and Ali Lazrak, when the latter refused to conform to an agreement that required all SP politicians to donate part of their wages. Lazrak accused Marijnissen of dictatorial behavior; an attempt to settle the argument failed and Lazrak left the fraction on 2 February 2004.

In February 2006 the party was polled on 9.5% of the electorate in the municipal elections. After the untimely end of Balkenende II and the minority government of Balkenende III, the SP won 16 more seats in the 2006 elections to a total of 25, becoming the third party of the Netherlands. Soon after, the party membership passed 50,000.

In 2006 a majority of members of parliament voted for his idea to build a National Historic Museum in the Netherlands. In 2007 the Minister of Culture decided the city of Arnhem would be its residence.

On 17 June 2008 Marijnissen announced his resignation as chairman of the SP group in the House of Representatives because of health reasons. However, he remains a member of the House of Representatives and chairman of the Socialist Party.

Marijnissen was said to appeal to the 'common man' because of his use of simple language. His appeal is also explained by some observers by his capacity of presenting himself as a valid, more social alternative to the PvdA, which moved into a more centrist third way direction by advocating welfare reforms under the leadership of Prime Minister Wim Kok and his so-called Purple Cabinets (1994–2002).

Critics of Marijnissen call his leadership style authoritarian, because he is presumed to have a tight grip on his party.

== Bibliography ==
- Samenleven kan je niet alleen (You can't live together alone), SP, (1993). (ISBN 90-801777-1-7)
- Tegenstemmen, een rood antwoord op Paars (Voting against, a red answer to Purple), (Amsterdam/Antwerp: L.J. Veen, 1996). (ISBN 90-254-0860-5). This book is also available in English under the title Enough! A socialist bites back. In 2006 three new English chapters were added with summaries of conclusion in his latter books. In 2007 the book became available in Greece under the title Αρκετά! . (Athens: Antilogos, 2007). (ISBN 978-960-89490-4-1)
- Effe Dimmen! Een rebel in Den Haag . (Amsterdam/Antwerp: L.J. Veen, 1998). (ISBN 90-204-5766-7).
- De laatste oorlog: Gesprekken over de nieuwe wereldorde (The last war), (Amsterdam/Antwerp: L.J. Veen, 2000). (ISBN 90-204-6022-6). Co-authored with Karel Glastra van Loon. A series of interviews with experts as Lord Carrington, Sir Michael Rose, Hans van den Broek, Noam Chomsky, Rob de Wijk en Georgi Arbatov on international conflicts with special attention to the role of the Dutch in these conflicts.
- Schrale Rijkdom: De erfenis van acht jaar Paars (Poor Richness), (Ketch-up Press, 2002). (ISBN 90-77133-01-1).
- Nieuw Optimisme (New Optimism), (Aspekt, 2003).
- Hoe dan, Jan (But how, Jan?), (Amsterdam/Antwerp: L.J. Veen, 2005). Two Dutch journalist wrote a question/ answer style book about how Marijnissen's ideas could become reality.
- Waar historie huis houdt (Where history lives), (Rap, 2005). In addition to his plea for a National Historic Museum for the Netherlands, Jan Marijnissen reveals his interest in history and the importance of history to a land and its culture.

Party political offices
Preceded by Hans van Hooft Sr.	Leader of the Socialist Party; 1986–2008	Succeeded by Agnes Kant
Preceded by Hans van Hooft Sr.	Chairman of the Socialist Party; 1988–2015	Succeeded by Ron Meyer
New title	Parliamentary leader of the Socialist Party in the House of Representatives of the Netherlands; 1994–2008	Succeeded by Agnes Kant
