= Leader of the Socialist Party (Netherlands) =

Socialist Party

The leader of the Socialist Party is the most senior politician within the Socialist Party (Dutch: Socialistische Partij, SP) in the Netherlands. The post is currently held by Jimmy Dijk, who succeeded Lilian Marijnissen on 13 December 2023.

== History ==
The leaders outwardly act as the 'figurehead' and the main representative of the party. Within the party, they must ensure political consensus. Except during the tenure of Daan Monjé, the leader is always the lead candidate of the party list at election time. Outside election time the Leader can serve as the opposition leader. Since the tenure of Jan Marijnissen, the leader has always been the parliamentary leader of the Socialist Party in the House of Representatives.

Leader		Term of office	Age as leader	Position(s) as leader	Further position(s)	Professional background	Lead candidate
Daan Monjé	Daan Monjé (1925–1986)	22 October 1971 – 1 October 1986 (14 years, 344 days)^{[Died]}	45–60			Metalworker; Activist	Remi Poppe; 1977
	Hans van Hooft Sr. (1941–2026)	1 October 1986 – 20 May 1988 (1 year, 232 days)	44–46	Chairman of the Socialist Party (1971–1988)		Metalworker	1981; 1982; 1986
Jan Marijnissen	Jan Marijnissen (born 1952)	20 May 1988 – 20 June 2008 (20 years, 31 days)	35–55	Chairman of the Socialist Party (1988–2015); Member of the House of Representatives (1994–2010); Parliamentary leader in the House of Representatives (1994–2008)		Metalworker; Activist; Author	1989; 1994; 1998; 2002; 2003; 2006
Agnes Kant	Agnes Kant (born 1967)	20 June 2008 – 5 March 2010 (1 year, 258 days)	41–43	Member of the House of Representatives (1998–2010); Parliamentary leader in the House of Representatives (2008–2010)		Epidemiologist; Medical researcher	
Emile Roemer	Emile Roemer (born 1962)	5 March 2010 – 13 December 2017 (7 years, 283 days)	47–55	Member of the House of Representatives (2006–2018); Parliamentary leader in the House of Representatives (2010–2017)	Mayor of Heerlen (2018–2020); Mayor of Alkmaar (2020–2021); King's Commissioner of Limburg (since 2021)	Teacher	2010; 2012; 2017
Lilian Marijnissen	Lilian; Marijnissen (born 1985)	13 December 2017 – 13 december 2023 (6 years, 0 days)	32–38	Member of the House of Representatives (2017–2023); Parliamentary leader in the House of Representatives (2017–2023)		Trade union leader Social worker	2021; 2023
Jimmy Dijk	Jimmy Dijk (born 1985)	13 December 2023 – Incumbent (2 years, 188 days)	38–	Member of the House of Representatives (since 2023); Parliamentary leader in the House of Representatives (since 2023)		Facilitator	2025
