= Emile Roemer =

Dutch politician

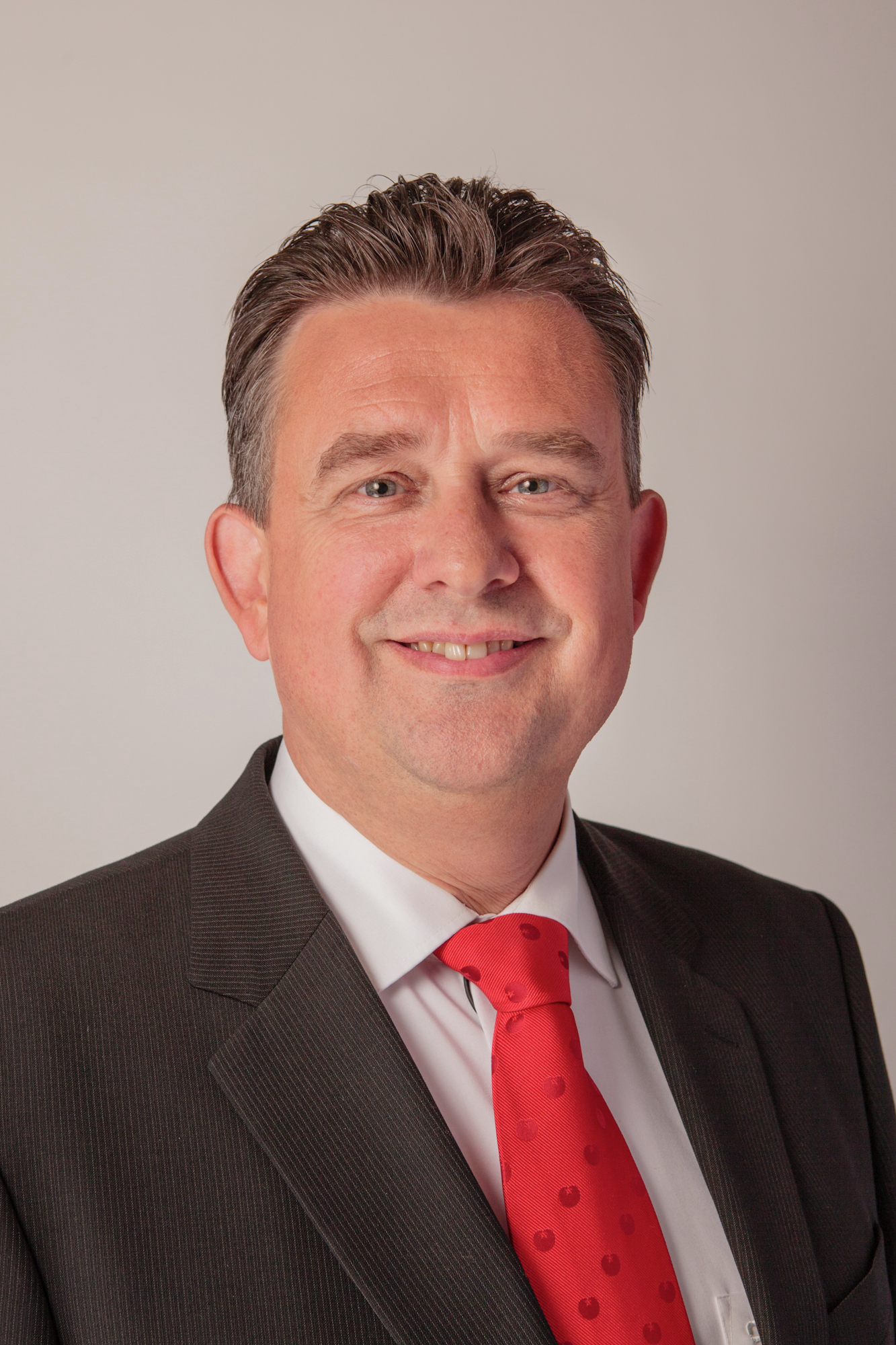

King's Commissioner of Limburg
- Incumbent
- Assumed office 1 December 2021
- Monarch: Willem-Alexander
- Preceded by: Johan Remkes (acting)

Mayor of Alkmaar
- Acting
- In office 1 October 2020 – 23 June 2021
- Preceded by: Piet Bruinooge
- Succeeded by: Anja Schouten

Mayor of Heerlen
- Acting
- In office 16 March 2018 – 28 September 2020
- Preceded by: Ralf Krewinkel
- Succeeded by: Roel Wever

Leader of the Socialist Party
- In office 5 March 2010 – 13 December 2017
- Preceded by: Agnes Kant
- Succeeded by: Lilian Marijnissen

Leader of the Socialist Party in the House of Representatives
- In office 5 March 2010 – 13 December 2017
- Preceded by: Agnes Kant
- Succeeded by: Lilian Marijnissen

Member of the House of Representatives
- In office 30 November 2006 – 18 January 2018

Personal details
- Born: Emile Gerardus Maria Roemer; 24 August 1962 (age 63) Boxmeer, Netherlands
- Party: Socialist Party (since 1980)
- Spouse: Aimée Roemer (m. 1986)
- Children: 2 daughters

Emile Gerardus Maria Roemer (born 24 August 1962) is a Dutch politician serving as King's Commissioner of Limburg since December 2021. A member of the Socialist Party (SP), he was its leader and parliamentary leader in the House of Representatives from 5 March 2010 until 13 December 2017. Roemer served as a member of the House of Representatives from 2006 until 2018, as acting Mayor of Heerlen from 2018 to 2020, and as acting mayor of Alkmaar from 2020 to 2021.

== Biography ==
=== Early life ===
Roemer was the fourth in a family of five children. His father was the head of department for an unknown company.

After finishing high school, Roemer studied to be an elementary school teacher. From 1986 until 1992, he was a teacher at an elementary school in Beuningen called 't Schrijverke. From 1992 until 2002, he was a teacher at an elementary school called De Peppels, located in his hometown Boxmeer.

=== Politics ===
In 1994 he was elected to the municipal council of Boxmeer; in 2002 he became the alderman in the municipal executive for finance. From 1980 until 2007 he was chairman of the Socialist Party in Boxmeer. In the 2006 general election, he was elected as a member of the House of Representatives for the Socialist Party. On 5 March 2010 he was elected the new party leader following the resignation of Agnes Kant. On 13 March 2010 he was elected as the SP lijsttrekker (top candidate) for the upcoming general election. He was again lijsttrekker in 2012 and 2017.

In 2018, he became Acting Mayor of Heerlen. In 2020, he became Acting Mayor of Alkmaar.

On 1 December 2021 he was installed as the new governor of the province of Limburg.

=== Personal life ===
Roemer has been married to Aimée Roemer since 1986. They have two daughters together.

Party political offices
Preceded by Agnes Kant	Leader of the Socialist Party; 2010–2017	Succeeded by Lilian Marijnissen
Preceded by Agnes Kant	Leader of the Socialist Party in the House of Representatives; 2010–2017	Succeeded by Lilian Marijnissen
