= Remi Poppe =

Dutch politician (born 1938)

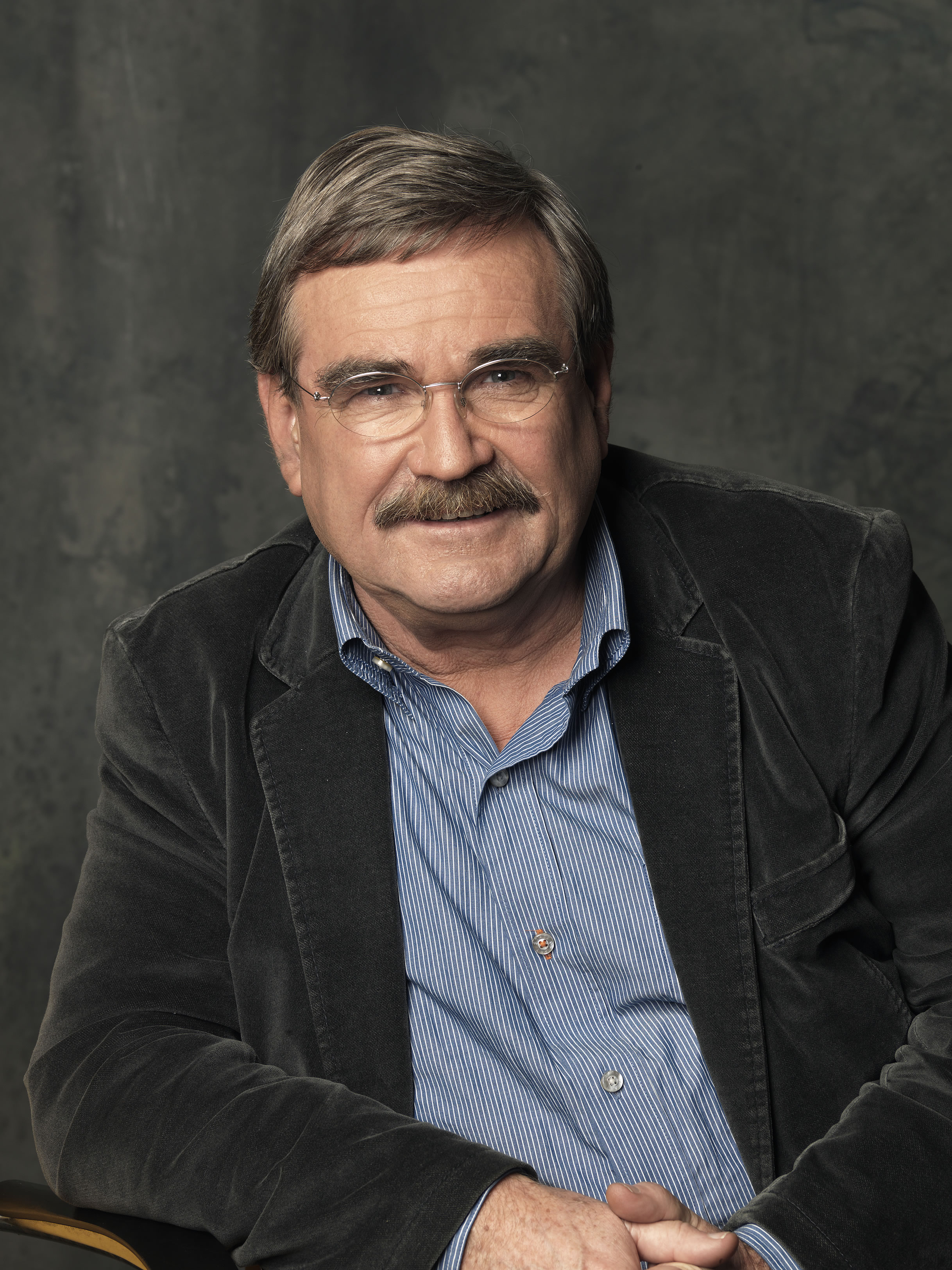

Member of the House of Representatives
- In office 30 November 2006 – 17 June 2010; 17 May 1994 – 23 May 2002

Personal details
- Born: Remi Jean Louis Poppe; 19 July 1938 (age 87) Velsen, the Netherlands
- Occupation: Dock worker · environmental activist · factory worker · gardener · painter · politician · sailor

Remi Jean Louis Poppe (born 19 July 1938) is a former Dutch politician and environmental activist. He was a member of the House of Representatives from 1994 to 2002 and again from 2006 to 2010 on behalf of the Socialist Party (SP).

== Education and environmental activism ==
Poppe only completed primary school. He was a gardener, sailor on coastal shipping, dock worker, factory worker and painter. In the late 1960s he was active as an environmental activist in the Rotterdam area.

Around 1967 he was part of an action committee called Stront aan de knikker (the Dutch equivalent of the idiom "shit hits the fan") and in 1969 he was one of the founders of the Centraal Aksiekomitee Rijnmond (CAR; 'Central Action Committee of Rijnmond') which fought against environmental pollution in the Rijnmond area. The organization soon became known when it successfully opposed the arrival of a Hoogovens steel mill on the Maasvlakte. What was special about the CAR was that it reached out to the workers in the polluting factories and succeeded quite well, arguing that an unhealthy working and living environment was also detrimental to the workers.

== Political activism ==
At a party conference in October 1972, at which the Communist Party of the Netherlands (Marxist-Leninist) (KPN/ML), founded in 1971, changed its name to the Socialist Party, Poppe, known and popular in radical left circles, was presented as a new member of the party and was directly elected to the party board. He fulfilled a prominent role in the Milieu Aktiecentrum Nederland (MAN; 'Environmental Action Center of the Netherlands'), a collaboration between the CAR and the Bond van Huurders en Woningzoekenden (BHW; 'Association of Renters and Housing Seekers'), which was founded in January 1973 and, like the BHW, a front organization of the SP. The MAN exposed environmental scandals near Billiton in Arnhem, near Diosynth in Oss, near Verdugt in Tiel, and at the waste management company Exploitatie Maatschappij Krimpen (EMK; 'Exploitation Company of Krimpen') in Krimpen aan den IJssel. On behalf of the SP, Poppe was the lead candidate in the municipal elections in his hometown of Vlaardingen in 1974 and also in the 1977 Dutch general election, both without winning any seats. In 1978, the SP obtained one seat in Vlaardingen on a joint ticket with the Pacifist Socialist Party (PSP), which Poppe was allowed to occupy from 1980. Until 1994 he was a councilor and faction leader on behalf of his party on the municipal council of Vlaardingen. In 1994 the SP became the largest party in Vlaardingen with Poppe as the lead candidate, winning 19 percent of the vote and seven seats.

In 1989 Poppe was the lead candidate of his party in the European parliamentary elections, but again without success. In the same year he started the MilieuAlarmTeam (MAT; 'EnvironmentalAlertTeam') within the party, which in its early years mainly focused on the Etex Group in Goor, where several employees died of cancer due to exposure to asbestos fibers. Poppe, now a self-proclaimed 'environmental detective', also uncovered illegal waste dumping from the processing company Zegwaard by following the company's trucks after he received a tip from an employee. In 1992 he was one of the initiators to plant 17,000 trees in De Lickebaert polder near Vlaardingen, in order to prevent the construction of a landfill. The illegal planting created the Volksbos ('People's Forest') nature reserve.

== Member of the House of Representatives ==
In the 1994 Dutch general election, the SP was successful for the first time in its existence. Poppe, together with party leader Jan Marijnissen, occupied the two parliamentary seats that were obtained. He was involved in matters such as environmental management and agriculture in the House. He made a case for recovering the costs of waste processing from the producer, but his motions for this did not win a majority. He also fought in the House for financial compensation for asbestosis victims. He was re-elected in the 1998 Dutch general election, in which the SP rose to five seats. In 1997 he was a member of the Cannerberg Parliamentary Commission of Inquiry into Asbestos Problems. Poppe was no longer eligible for re-election in the 2002 Dutch general election because he wanted to be active in local politics again. Poppe returned to the House of Representatives after the 2006 Dutch general election. He was in a low 19th position on the candidate list, but due to the party's unexpectedly large win, that was enough to be re-elected. After he left parliament again in 2010, he was the lijstduwer in the 2017 Dutch general election.

== Publications ==
In 1993, Karel Glastra van Loon wrote the book De Poppe-methode: milieu-activist Remi Poppe ontmaskert de grote vervuilers ('The Poppe method: environmental activist Remi Poppe exposes the big polluters') about Poppe's activities as an environmental activist and fighter against major polluters.

== Personal life ==
Poppe is the son of a Dutch father and Belgian mother. His mother fled to the Netherlands during World War I due to the violence of war in her native country. He is married and father of two daughters. He is a cousin of former Labour Party politician Stan Poppe.

== Electoral history ==
Electoral history of Remi Poppe
Year	Body	Party	Pos.	Votes	Result		Ref.
Year	Body	Party	Pos.	Votes	Party seats	Individual	Ref.
2024	European Parliament	Socialist Party	30 (Note: Poppe participated as lijstduwer.)	1,431	0	Lost	
2025	House of Representatives	Socialist Party	50				
