= Jannie Visscher =

Dutch politician

Chairman of the Socialist Party
- In office 14 December 2019 – 2 March 2024
- Preceded by: Ron Meyer
- Succeeded by: Lieke van Rossum

Personal details
- Born: 8 November 1961 (age 64) Dedemsvaart, Netherlands
- Party: Socialist Party

Jannie Visscher (born 8 November 1961) is a Dutch politician for the Socialist Party (SP). From 2006 to 2014, she was alderman of Groningen. From 2014 to 2018, she was alderman in Eindhoven. From 2019 to 2024, she was party chairman of the SP.

== Biography ==
She studied agricultural environmental science at the Rijks Hogere Landbouwschool in Groningen. In 2006, she became alderman in that city on behalf of the SP for health care, the elderly, urban management and environment. After the 2010 municipal elections, she was given the portfolios of welfare and health care, the elderly, waste management, urban management, ecology and animal welfare, recreation, and integration and emancipation.

In May 2014 she became alderman in the municipality of Eindhoven with the portfolios youth, education, special education, housing of educational institutions, traffic, transport, and mobility.

In the 2018 municipal elections, Visscher was elected as a councilor in the municipality of Eindhoven.

In the 2019 European Parliament election, Visscher was placed second on the SP's list of candidates, which was not enough to be elected. Shortly afterwards she applied for the vacant position of national party chairman. During the party congress on 14 December 2019, she was elected party chairman of the Socialist Party.
