= Ron Meyer (politician) =

Dutch politician and trade unionist

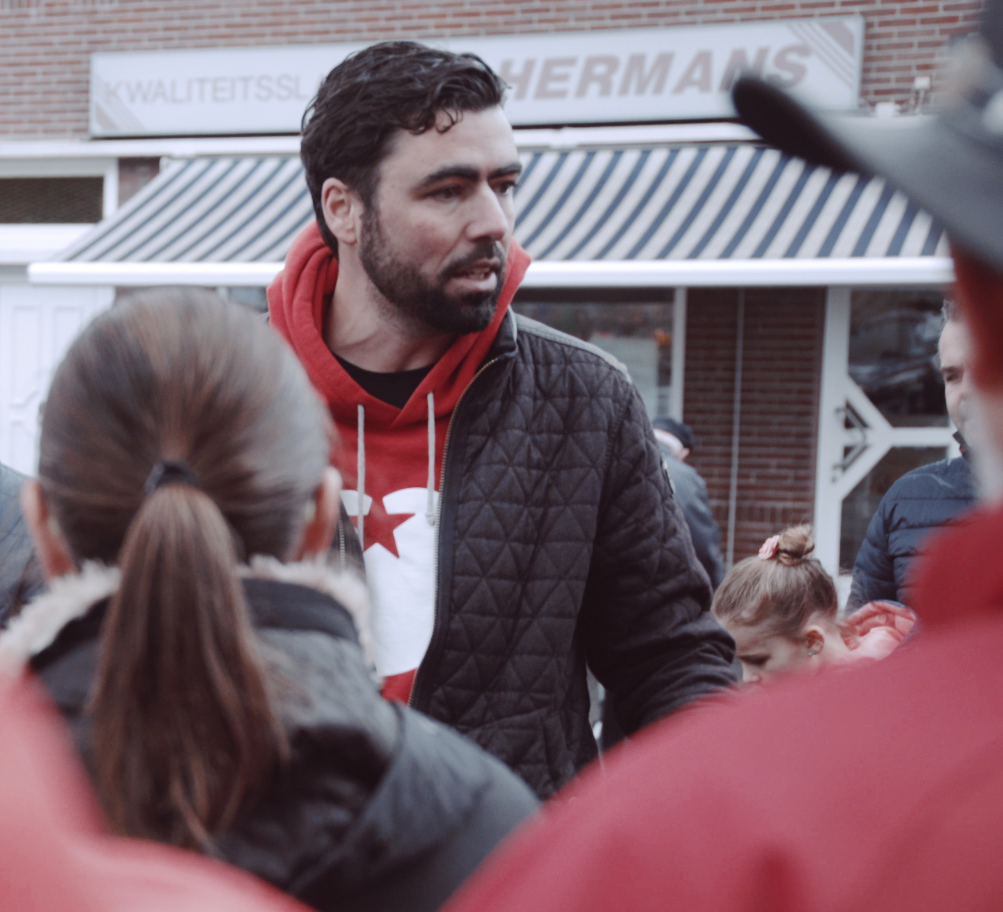

Chairman of the Socialist Party
- Preceded by: Jan Marijnissen
- Succeeded by: Jannie Visscher
- In office 28 November 2015 – 14 December 2019

Personal details
- Born: 21 October 1981 (age 44) Heerlen, Netherlands

Ron Meyer (born 21 October 1981) is a Dutch politician and former trade unionist. He was the chairman of the Dutch Socialist Party from November 2015 to December 2019 and is a city councillor in Heerlen . Meyer became known after leading strikes in the cleaning industry and the distribution centres of Albert Heijn.

== Biography ==
Meyer was born in Zeswegen near Heerlen, a former mining area. His father was a cooling mechanic and his mother a home care worker. After the closing of the mines many coalminers became unemployed. The former mining region became characterised by unemployment and deprivation. After studying fiscal law, Meyer joined the Socialist Party and the trade union FNV. Meyer got involved as a trade union leader in labour agreement negotiations in the cleaning industry and at distribution centres of supermarkets.

== Party leadership ==
In 2015 Meyer contested in the election of party leadership of the Socialist Party. Former leader Jan Marijnissen stepped down after leading the party for 27 years. Meyer contested former MP Sharon Gesthuizen in the election. In his campaign Meyer emphasised the role for more grassroots activism within the SP whereas Gesthuizen ran a campaign on changing the electoral system of the party. Gesthuizen also called for reaching out beyond the traditional working class vote and also suggested to promote business interests. Meyer won the election with 59 percent of the vote.

In May 2019, after the poor results in the European elections 2019, he announced to retire as chairman in December 2019.
