= Daan Monjé =

Dutch socialist (1925–1986)

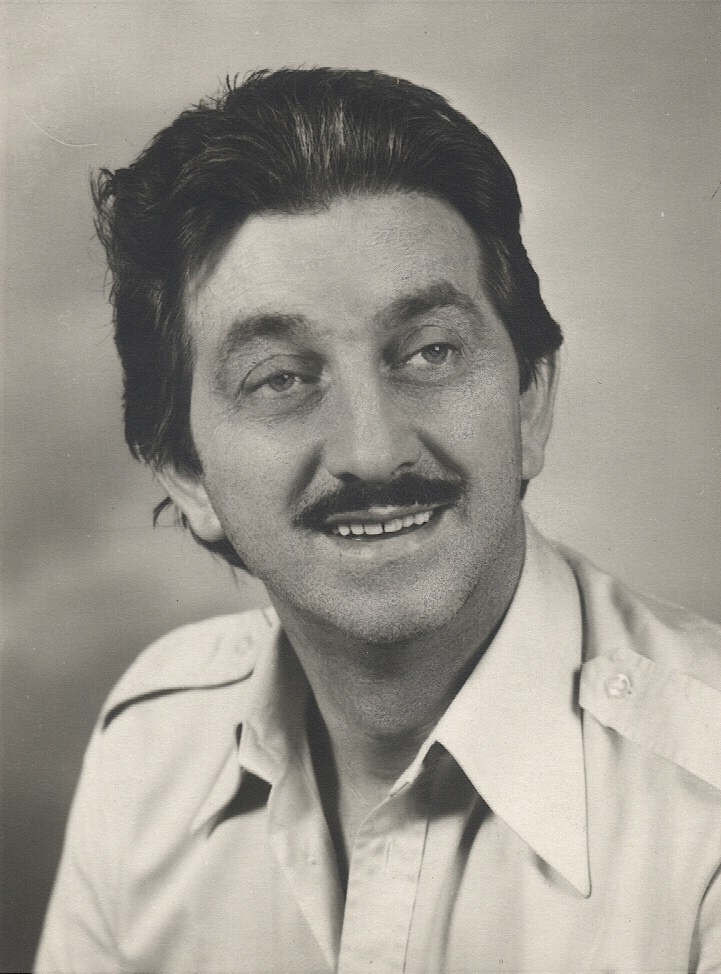
- Portrait of Daan Monjé, 1970s

Leader of the Socialist Party
- In office 22 October 1971 – 1 October 1986
- Preceded by: Office established (as organizing secretary)
- Succeeded by: Hans van Hooft Sr. (as Chairman of the Socialist Party)

Personal details
- Born: 24 October 1925 Amsterdam, the Netherlands
- Died: 1 October 1986 (aged 60) Rotterdam, the Netherlands
- Occupation: Pipefitter · political activist

Daniël "Daan" Monjé (24 October 1925 – 1 October 1986) was a Dutch politician and activist. Monjé, a pipefitter by profession in the port of Rotterdam, was co-founder of both the Socialist Party and its direct predecessor, the Communist Unity Movement of the Netherlands (Marxist–Leninist) (KEN-ML).

Monjé was expelled from the Communist Party of the Netherlands (CPN) together with his kameraad Nico Schrevel in 1966 because of overt sympathy for Mao. Monjé and Schrevel had by then founded the Marxist-Leninist Center (MLC) in Rotterdam, renamed the Marxist-Leninist Center in the Netherlands (MLCN) in 1965. With these, they tried to influence the CPN and individual members of that party from outside to opt for Maoism.

From 1967, the course to influence the CPN was abandoned and attention was directed towards the formation of a distinct political party. This became the KEN, founded in 1970. In 1971, the paths of Schrevel and Monjé split after an ideological disagreement. Monjé and a number of followers, including future party leader Jan Marijnissen, formed the Communist Party of the Netherlands (Marxist-Leninist) (KPN-ML), which would be renamed Socialist Party (SP) a year later. Hans van Hooft Sr. became chairman of the new party. In the background, however, Monjé was in charge of the SP. He would maintain this position until his death. The SP was not able to penetrate the House of Representatives during this period, but was represented in a number of municipal councils, including in Nijmegen and Oss. Monjé played an important role in the construction of the SP. His sense of business and organizational talent ensured that the SP, despite its marginal size, had a well-stocked party fund, with which various actions could be funded.

In the last years of his life, Monjé's power waned. A point of contention between him and other members of the party council was the UK miners' strike of 1984–85. A debate arose in the party about support for the miners, against the wishes of Monjé, who thought that the SP should support the strikers unconditionally. Against the will of the board, Monjé bought food packages, which he sent to the United Kingdom. Before the conflict could be resolved in the party, he fell seriously ill. Daan Monjé died in October 1986 at the age of sixty. His funeral at Hofwijk General Cemetery in Rotterdam was attended by hundreds of kameraden from the CPN, KEN and SP.
