= Workers Party of the Netherlands (build-up organisation) =

- Founded: 1980
- Ideology: Communism; Marxism-Leninism; Anti-revisionism; Hoxhaism
- Political position: Far-left

Workers Party of the Netherlands (build-up organisation) (Dutch: Arbeiderspartij van Nederland (opbouworganisatie), abbreviated APN(o)) was a communist party in the Netherlands. APN(o) was founded in 1980, following a split from the Communist Workers Organisation (marxist-leninist) (KAO(ml)). It upheld the line of the Albanian Party of Labour after the Sino-Albanian split. It had an Hoxhaist ideology.

APN(o) published Revolutionaire Arbeider.

In 1981, APN(o) released an electoral manifesto titled 'For the Socialist Republic' (Voor de Socialistische Republiek).

In 1981 and 1982, APN(o) took part in May Day rallies together with Turkish and Surinamese organisations. In 1982 the Portuguese People's Democratic Union branch in the Netherlands took part in the May Day Committee together with APN(o).
