= Agnes Kant =

Dutch politician (born 1967)

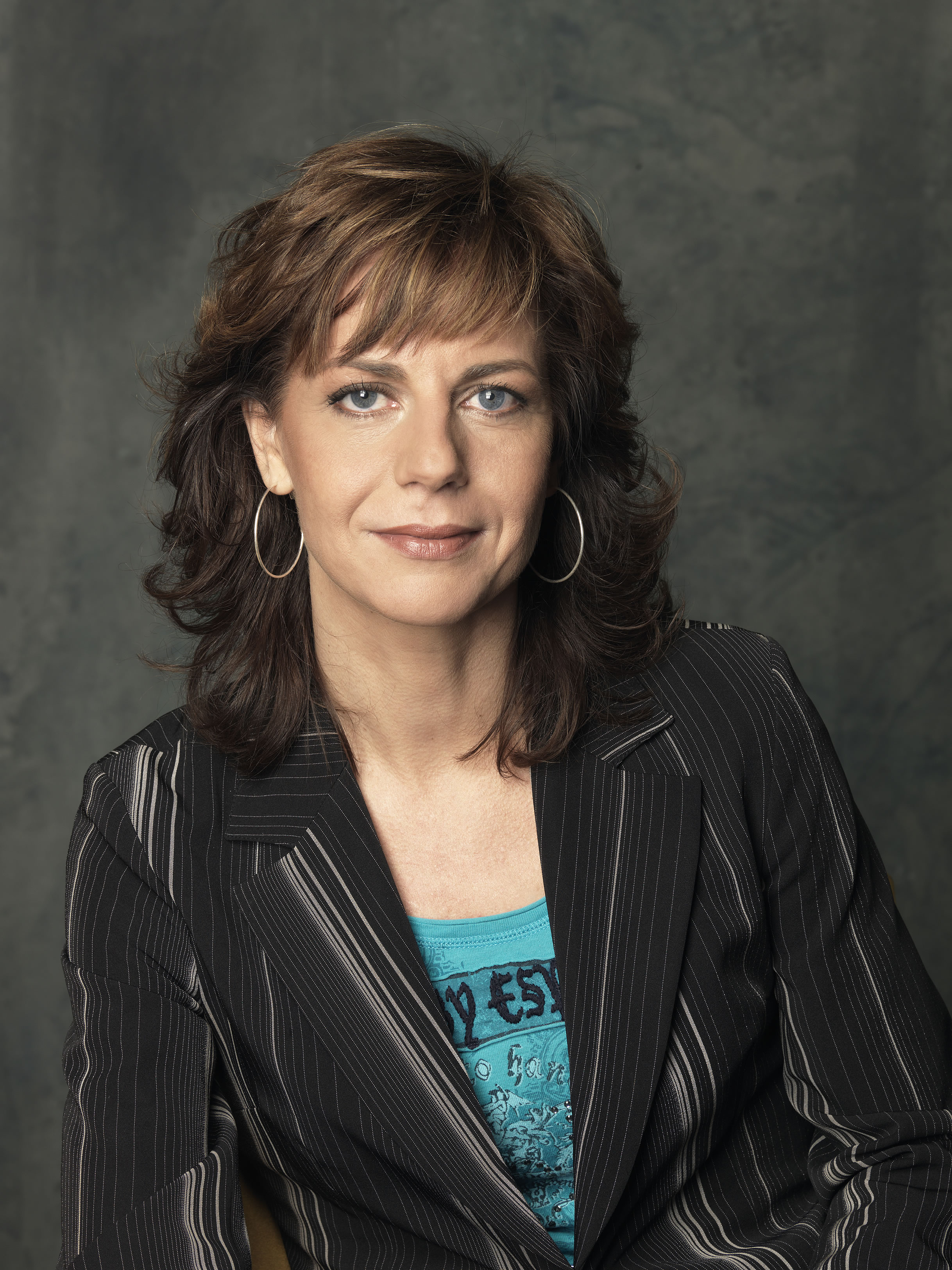
- Agnes Kant in 2006

Leader of the Socialist Party
- In office 20 June 2008 – 5 March 2010
- Preceded by: Jan Marijnissen
- Succeeded by: Emile Roemer

Parliamentary leader of the Socialist Party in the House of Representatives
- In office 20 June 2008 – 5 March 2010
- Preceded by: Jan Marijnissen
- Succeeded by: Emile Roemer

Member of the House of Representatives
- In office 19 May 1998 – 17 June 2010

Personal details
- Born: Agnes Catharina Kant; 20 January 1967 (age 59) Hessisch-Oldendorf, West Germany
- Party: Socialist Party (from 1989)
- Children: 2 daughters
- Education: Radboud University Nijmegen
- Occupation: Politician; Researcher; Nonprofit director

Agnes Catharina Kant (born 20 January 1967) is a retired Dutch politician of the Socialist Party (SP). She was an MP from 1998 to 2010. She was also the parliamentary leader in the House of Representatives from 20 June 2008 until 4 March 2010. After suffering major losses in the municipal elections of 3 March 2010, she stepped down as parliamentary group leader and announced she would not be a candidate for re-election in the upcoming national elections.

Party political offices
Preceded by Jan Marijnissen	Leader of the Socialist Party; 2008–2010	Succeeded by Emile Roemer
Preceded by Jan Marijnissen	Parliamentary Leader of the Socialist Party in the House of Representatives; 2008–2010	Succeeded by Emile Roemer
