= Communist Workers Organisation (Marxist–Leninist) =

Communist group in the Netherlands

Communist Workers Organisation (Marxist-Leninist)
- Founded: March 1978
- Dissolved: 1990
- Merger of: League of Dutch Marxist–Leninists; Communist Workers Organisation; Communist Circle of Breda (Marxist–Leninist)
- Newspaper: Rode Vlag
- Ideology: Communism; Marxism-Leninism; Three Worlds Theory
- Political position: Far-left

Communist Workers Organisation (in Dutch: Kommunistische Arbeidersorganisatie (marxistisch-leninistisch), abbreviated KAO (ml)) was a communist group in the Netherlands. It was founded in March 1978 through the merger of the League of Dutch Marxist-Leninists (BNML), the Communist Workers Organisation (KAO) and the Communist Circle of Breda (marxist-leninist) (KKB (ml)). All of these had their origins in the pro-Chinese faction of the Communist Party of the Netherlands.

The Communist Circle of Breda was formed in August 1972 by a group of Communist Unity Movement of the Netherlands (Marxist–Leninist) militants in North Brabant who refused to shift to Rotterdam when the new party leadership ordered them to do so.

The main organ of KAO (ml) was Rode Vlag (Red Flag).

KAO (ml) was active during the Rotterdam port strike of 1979.

KAO (ml) upheld the Three Worlds Theory promoted by the Chinese Communist Party. This eventually led to a split, with one section breaking away and forming the Workers Party of the Netherlands (build-up organisation) (Arbeiderspartij van Nederland (opbouworganisatie)) in 1980.

KAO (ml) dissolved around 1990.

== Literature ==
- Harmsen, G. (1982): Nederlands Kommunisme. Gebundelde opstellen, Nijmegen, Sun. ISBN 90-6168-193-6
- Vos, Chris (et al.) (2005): De geheime dienst, verhalen over de BVD, Amsterdam, Boom. ISBN 9085061814
