= Lilian Marijnissen =

Dutch politician (born 1985)

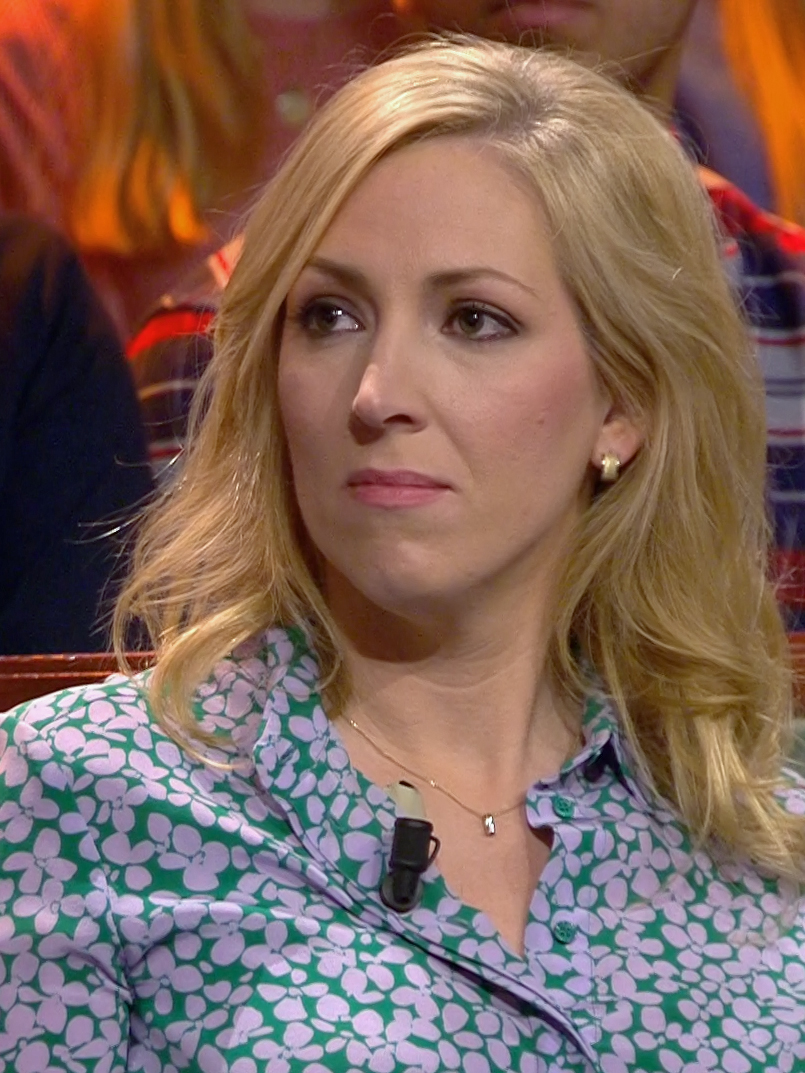
- Marijnissen in 2018

Leader of the Socialist Party
- In office 13 December 2017 – 12 December 2023
- Preceded by: Emile Roemer
- Succeeded by: Jimmy Dijk

Leader of the Socialist Party in the House of Representatives
- In office 13 December 2017 – 12 December 2023
- Preceded by: Emile Roemer
- Succeeded by: Jimmy Dijk

Member of the House of Representatives
- In office 23 March 2017 – 12 December 2023
- Succeeded by: Sarah Dobbe

Personal details
- Born: Lilian Marie Corneel Marijnissen; 11 July 1985 (age 41) Oss, Netherlands
- Party: Socialist Party (2000–present)
- Children: 1
- Parent: Jan Marijnissen (father)
- Education: Radboud University Nijmegen (B.Soc.Sc.); University of Amsterdam (MSocSc)
- Occupation: Politician, trade union leader

Lilian Marie Corneel Marijnissen (born 11 July 1985) is a Dutch politician who served as Leader of the Socialist Party and as its parliamentary leader in the House of Representatives from December 2017 to December 2023. She was first installed as a member of the House of Representatives on 23 March 2017 following the general election of 15 March.

On 9 December 2023, she announced that she would step down as member of the House of Representatives as well as leader of the Socialist Party in the House of Representatives.

Marijnissen is a daughter of Jan Marijnissen, a politician and formerly the leader of the same party. Her mother is Mari-Anne Marijnissen. Lilian Marijnissen previously served as a member of the municipal council of Oss from 2003 to 2016 like her mother before her.

== Personal life ==
From 2018 to 2021, Marijnissen was in a relationship with Dutch television presenter and sports reporter Bart Nolles. She later entered a relationship with Joeri Jansen, and their daughter was born in September 2024.

== Electoral history ==
Electoral history of Lilian Marijnissen
Year	Body	Party	Pos.	Votes	Result		Ref.
Year	Body	Party	Pos.	Votes	Party seats	Individual	Ref.
2017	House of Representatives	Socialist Party	3	124,626	14	Won	
2021	House of Representatives	Socialist Party	1	416,690	9	Won	
2023	House of Representatives	Socialist Party	1	273,734	5	Won	

Party political offices
Preceded by Emile Roemer	Leader of the Socialist Party; 2017–present	Incumbent
Preceded by Emile Roemer	Parliamentary leader of the Socialist Party in the House of Representatives; 2017–2023	
