= Spartacist League (disambiguation) =

The Spartacist League is the name of several Trotskyist groups, which are sections of the International Communist League (Fourth Internationalist):

- Spartacist League (US)
- Spartacist League of Britain
- Spartacist League of Australia
- Spartacist League of Israel
- Spartacist League of Sri Lanka

Spartacus League is the name of:

- The original Spartacus League (Spartakusbund, 1914–1919), a communist organisation in post-World War I Germany well known for its ties to the revolutionary Rosa Luxemburg
- Spartacus League of Left Communist Organisations (Spartakusbund linkskommunistischer Organisationen, 1926–1927), a league of left communist organisations in Germany.
- Spartacus League (1974) (Spartacusbund, 1974–1981/82), a Trotskyist group in Germany
- Spartacus League UK (1970–1972), a youth group linked with the International Marxist Group
- Spartacus League (Greece)
