= Jimmy Dijk =

Dutch politician (born 1985)

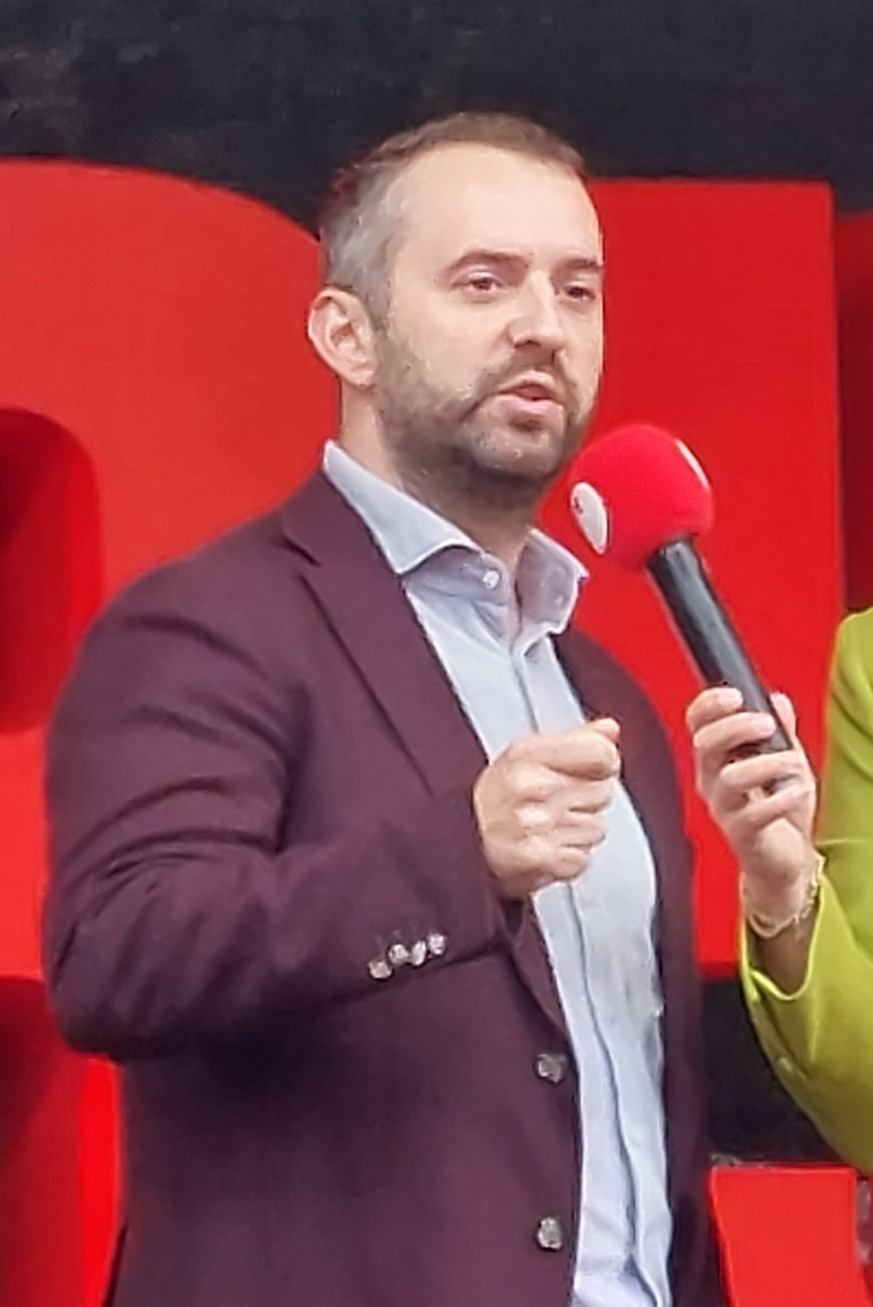
- Dijk in September 2023

Leader of the Socialist Party
- Incumbent
- Assumed office 13 December 2023
- Preceded by: Lilian Marijnissen

Leader of the Socialist Party in the House of Representatives
- Incumbent
- Assumed office 13 December 2023
- Preceded by: Lilian Marijnissen

Member of the House of Representatives
- Incumbent
- Assumed office 20 April 2023

Member of the Groningen Municipal Council
- In office 11 March 2010 – 16 May 2023

Personal details
- Born: Jimmy Pieter Dijk; 3 November 1985 (age 40) Oldenzijl, Netherlands
- Party: Socialist Party
- Spouse: Mechteld van Duin (m. 2025)
- Education: University of Groningen
- Occupation: Politician, facilitator

Jimmy Pieter Dijk (born 3 November 1985) is a Dutch politician of the Socialist Party (SP). Since 20 April 2023, he has been a member of the House of Representatives. On 13 December 2023, he succeeded Lilian Marijnissen as party leader of the SP. Dijk previously served as a member of the municipal council of Groningen from 2010 to 2023.

== Biography ==
Dijk was born and raised in Oldenzijl, Groningen with his two older brothers and one older sister. His father worked as a furniture maker, and his mother, who was from France, worked as a French teacher. He attended Het Hogeland College in Warffum and studied sociology at the University of Groningen, while working at a cardboard factory. After his graduation, he worked as a bartender.

In September 2010, Dijk became a member of the municipal council of Groningen as a temporary replacement for the departing Peter Verschuren. In January 2013, he succeeded Eelco Eikenaar as the leader of the SP group in the municipal council. Among other achievements, he strengthened the position of tenants living in poor conditions.

Next to his council work, Dijk had also been active for the SP as a campaign leader and a member of the party board. In the 2021 Dutch general election, he was listed tenth on the candidate list of the SP. The party only received votes for nine seats, and he was therefore not elected into the House of Representatives. In April 2023, Dijk joined the House of Representatives after Maarten Hijink vacated his seat, becoming the party spokesperson for health. After taking office, he committed to preventing the closure of hospitals, such as those in Zutphen and Heerlen.

Dijk succeeded Lilian Marijnissen as leader of the SP when she stepped down in December 2023 due to disappointing election results. In his first speech as party leader, Dijk said the party's focus would be on class struggle, opining that it is necessary to combat tension and division resulting from the dominance of neoliberal thought in the Netherlands since the 1990s. Besides serving as the SP's parliamentary leader in the House of Representatives, he is the party's spokesperson for healthcare, finances, and Europe. A House majority supported a motion by Dijk to ban private equity firms from investing in the Dutch healthcare sector, similar to motions passed during previous cabinets. Minister Fleur Agema advised against the measure.

== Personal life ==
On 3 October 2025, Dijk married Mechteld van Duin, a fellow SP member whom he had met over twelve years earlier. He is a supporter of FC Groningen.

== Electoral history ==
Electoral history of Jimmy Dijk
Year	Body	Party	Pos.	Votes	Result		Ref.
Year	Body	Party	Pos.	Votes	Party seats	Individual	Ref.
2017	House of Representatives	Socialist Party	35	1,086	14	Lost	
2021	House of Representatives	Socialist Party	10	1,757	9	Lost (Note: Dijk was appointed to the body later during the term due to a vacancy.)	
2023	House of Representatives	Socialist Party	4	2,633	5	Won	
2025	House of Representatives	Socialist Party	1	117,476	3	Won	
