= BVD =

Brand of underwear

- Company type: Subsidiary
- Industry: underwear
- Founded: 1876; 150 years ago
- Headquarters: United States
- Products: underwear
- Owner: Fruit of the Loom
- Website: bvd.com

BVD is a brand of men's underwear, which are commonly referred to as "BVDs". The brand was founded in 1876 and named after the last initials of the three founders of the New York City firm: Joseph W. Bradley, Luther C. Voorhees, and Lyman H. Day. The BVD brand, originally produced for men and women, in the United States is now produced solely for men by Fruit of the Loom. The BVD brand is also sold in Japan.

== History ==
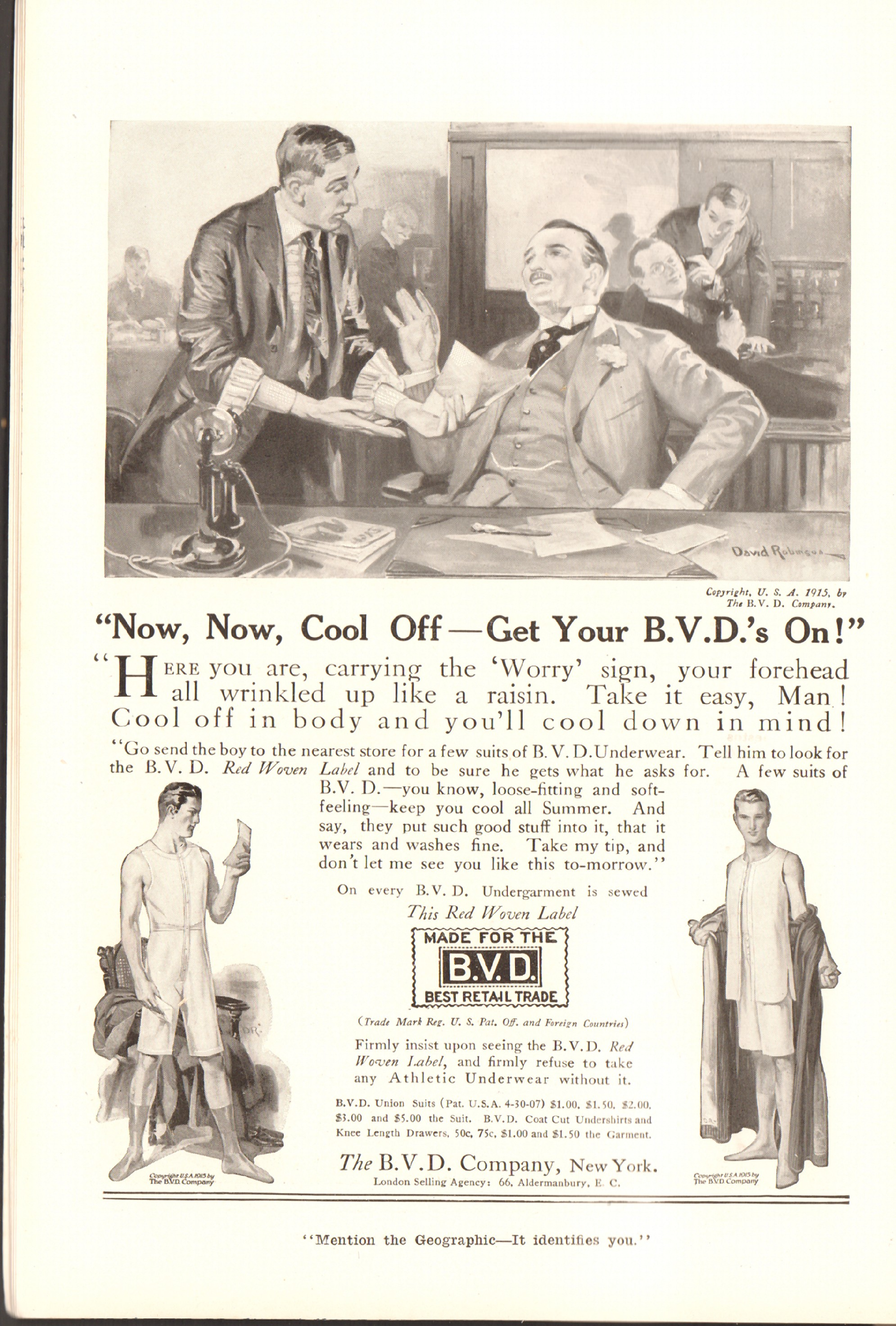
BVD advertisement from 1915

BVD first manufactured bustles for women. They then became famous for their men's union suits made of heavy knitted fabric. In 1908, that bulky and tight-fitting garment was turned into a new kind of loose-fitting underwear. They went on to introduce a two-piece and the popular union suit as well as a lightweight waffle-like fabric with the advertising slogan, "Next to Myself I Like BVD Best".

At the beginning of the 1930s, BVD was purchased by the Atlas Underwear company of Piqua, Ohio. During the Great Depression, they were successful in manufacturing swimsuits for men, women and children. They patented their own fabric, Sea Satin, a rayon woven satin backed with latex for stretch. They also used knits of cotton, wool and rayon, and cellophane. Their swimsuits featured in major fashion magazines and high-fashion stores. Styles included form-fitting maillots as well as full-skirted swimsuits. They offered suits for men with detachable tops. In 1929, Olympic swimmer Johnny Weissmuller, who went on to become the most famous Tarzan in motion pictures, was hired as a model and representative. He was featured at swim shows throughout the country wearing the BVD brand of swimsuits, handing out leaflets and giving autographs.

In 1951, the brand was purchased by Superior Mills. BVD was first to start packaging underwear in plastic bags for the mass market. In the 1960s and 1970s, they started introducing sportops, a pocket T-shirt, and fashionable underwear made of nylon. In 1976, BVD was purchased by Fruit of the Loom. The company filed for bankruptcy in 1999 and was purchased by Berkshire Hathaway in 2001.

== In other languages ==
In certain dialects of Spanish, the term bibidí, pronounced like the English initials, is an eponym for a man's sleeveless underwear T-shirt.
