= Communist Unity Movement of the Netherlands (Marxist–Leninist) =

Communist Unity Movement of the Netherlands (marxist-leninist) Kommunistiese Eenheidsbeweging Nederland (marxisties-leninisties)
- Founded: 1964
- Dissolved: 1985
- Split from: Communist Party of the Netherlands
- Youth wing: Young Communist League
- Ideology: Communism; Marxism-Leninism; Mao Zedong Thought; Anti-revisionism
- Colours: Red

Communist Unity Movement of the Netherlands (marxist-leninist) (Dutch: Kommunistiese Eenheidsbeweging Nederland (marxisties-leninisties); KEN (ml)) was a communist organization in the Netherlands founded in 1964.

== History ==
The organization started as a pro-China leftist faction within the Communist Party of the Netherlands in 1964. At that time, it called itself Marxist-Leninist Centre (Marxistisch-Leninistisch Centrum) and transpired by the Communist Party section 33 in Blijdorp, Rotterdam. Leading figures (in an organization of only a handful of members) were Nico Schrevel and Daan Monjé. MLC ( Marxist-Leninist Centre ) started publishing the magazine, Spartacus. Before the 21st CPN party congress, MLC issued the appeal 'For the Unity of the Communist Movement'. At the end of 1964, the CPN leadership expelled Schrevel and Monjé.

At this time, MLC was one of two pro-Chinese factions expelled from the CPN. The other was assembled around the periodical Rode Vlag. Plans for a merger stalled, as the Rode Vlag-group maintained that it was still possible to convert CPN into a revolutionary party.

In March 1965, MLC changed its name to Marxist-Leninist Centre of the Netherlands (Marxistisch Leninistisch Centrum Nederland). The name of Spartacus changed to Rode Tribune, possibly since the name Spartacus seen to have Trotskyist connotations. By this time, the group had attracted a few more members. One of the recruits was Pieter Boevé, a General Intelligence and Security Service (BVD)-agent. Boevé became the international secretary of MLCN. However, his double-play discovered, and he got expelled. Later the BVD set up its own Marxist-Leninist Party of the Netherlands with Boevé as its leader.

In 1966, MLCN launched a youth wing, the Young Communist League, that did not last long.

In January 1970, the name of MLCN was changed to KEN (ml). By this time, the organization had grown and started attracting radical students. Membership estimates vary from 200 to 300. KEN (ml) formed a youth wing, Marxist-Leninist Youth, and a student wing, Marxist-Leninist Students League. Nico Schrevel was the national political secretary of KEN (ml).

Other KEN (ml) fronts were the League of Tenants and House-seekers (Bond van Huurders en Woningzoekenden, BHW) and Workers Power (Arbeidersmacht). KEN (ml) played a leading role during the 1970 Rotterdam port strike-through Arbeidersmacht, even though the KEN (ml) membership only had very few workers.

In the summer of 1971, the Red Youth branches of Nijmegen and Rotterdam crossed over to KEN (ml).

During the fall of 1971, KEN (ml) riddled by internal strife. An issue dividing the organization was the role of intellectuals in the class struggle. The majority led by Monjé supported the line that the working class had to be the supreme force in the revolutionary struggle. They raised the slogan "Where do the correct ideas come from? From practice or the study chamber?". In October a majority of around 60% left to form the Communist Party of the Netherlands (Marxist-Leninist) (KPN (ml)) with Monjé as their leader. KPN (ml) took with them BHW and Arbeidersmacht but lost their influence at the universities. KPN (ml) was mainly active in the southern provinces of the Netherlands. The minority continued as KEN (ml), had its original centre at the Economische Hogeschool in Tilburg. The 'new' KEN (ml) became primarily active in Rotterdam ports, the shipbuilding industry and dockers- and metalworkers unions. KEN (ml) organized its own National Vietnam Committee (Landelijk Vietnam Komitee) and founded the Communist Student League KSB.

Tilburg students moved to Rotterdam to reconstruct the organization. The dominance of the Tilburg students provoked a section of Rotterdam members to leave KEN (ml) in March 1972 and form the Marxist-Leninist Rotterdam Group. Similarly, a group of KEN (ml) members from the Brabant town of Breda, who refused to move to the Rotterdam area, broke away in August. They formed the Communist Circle of Breda (Marxist-Leninist). Some Rotterdam veterans of the organization, among them Nico Schrevel, also left the movement. In the following years, KEN (ml) and KPN (ml) remained the only Marxist-Leninist groups with national organizations.

In 1974, Tilburg-student Kees de Boer became the leader op KEN (ml). After 1976, under his leadership, the KEN (ml) took an obscure turn. The cadres directed to live in communes. They were all aspects of daily life under the control of the organization. Many members were expelled, accused of bourgeois deviations. In 1977 different groups of expellees regrouped in the Group of Marxist-Leninists/Red Dawn.

In 1977, KEN (ml) registered itself for the parliamentary elections. One of the issues raised by KEN (ml) in the electoral campaign was a discourse in support of the unity of independent Western European countries against the imperialism of the two Superpowers. In the end, KEN (ml) got 2722 votes. On the same line of opposing the hegemony of two superpowers, KEN (ml) had organized a front organization called 'Movement for Freedom and Independence' (Beweging voor Vrijheid en Onafhankelijkheid), which saw NATO as a necessary instrument to defend Western Europe. This BVO lasted less than a year. KEN (ml) disbanded around 1985.

== Sources ==
- Wouter P. Beekers "Mao in de polder: Een historisch-sociologische benadering van het Nederlandse maoïsme 1964-1978" {Doctoraalscriptie} (18 January 2005). Retrieved 5 September 2012.
- Archief Kommunistische Eenheidsbeweging Nederland (marxistisch-leninistisch)
- "Kameraden onder elkaar: Hoe de BVD de weg bereidde voor de Socialistiese Partij," NRC Handelsblad (20-02-1999). Retrieved 5 September 2012.
