= Group of Marxist–Leninists/Red Dawn =

Group of Marxist-Leninists/Red Dawn Groep Marxisten-Lenisten/Rode Morgen
- Chairman: Jeroen Toussaint
- Founded: 1977
- Split from: Communist Unity Movement of the Netherlands (Marxist-Leninist)
- Headquarters: Rotterdam
- Newspaper: Rode Morgen
- Youth wing: Jong en Strijdbaar (JES!)
- Ideology: Communism; Marxism-Leninism; Maoism; Anti-revisionism
- Political position: Far-left
- International affiliation: ICOR

Group of Marxist–Leninists/Red Dawn (Dutch: Groep van Marxisten-Leninisten/Rode Morgen) is a Maoist group in the Netherlands. GML/Rode Morgen was founded in 1977, as a merger of a group of Amsterdam students and some groups of individuals expelled from the Communist Unity Movement of the Netherlands (Marxist-Leninist) (KEN (ml)) in 1976. At the time of its foundation it had around 25 members. From the start, GML was mainly active in factories and trade unions.

GML played an important role during the 1979 Rotterdam port strike. Representative of the Transport Union and GML member Paul Rosenmöller, who later became the leader of the GreenLeft party, was one of the strike leaders. In 2007 the weekly magazine HP/De Tijd analyzed the views of this organisation and Rosenmöller on Pol Pot's Khmer Rouge. Although the Khmer Rouge crimes against humanity were publicized in the Western press as early as 1977, the group remained openly loyal to the Khmer Rouge for several years after that. According to HP, Rosenmöller denied any support to the Pol Pot regime.

In 1981–1982 GML/Rode Morgen lost a big part of its original members. The GML/Rode Morgen still exists and is mainly active in the city of Rotterdam, although it also lists contacts in Amsterdam, Eindhoven and Utrecht. For many years the former Rotterdam dockworker Jeroen Toussaint has been its political secretary (chairman). GML publishes the magazine Rode Morgen.

Internationally the GML is part of ICOR, an international grouping of anti-revisionist and Maoist communist parties, led by the German MLPD.

== See also ==
- List of anti-revisionist groups
