= Red Youth (Netherlands) =

Historic communist organization in the Netherlands

Red Youth (Dutch: Rode Jeugd) was a communist organization in the Netherlands. It originated in the group around the periodical Rode Jeugd, which had been started by the pro-China Rode Vlag-grouping in 1966. In October 1967 the group around Rode Jeugd broke away, and formed their own organisation, Red Youth. The group was most active in the city of Eindhoven. They also used the names Revolutionair Volksverzet Nederland (Revolutionary People's Resistance Netherlands, RVN) and Philips Griekenland Aktiegroep (Philips Greece Action Group) as public cover names for "illegal" actions.

Lucien van Hoesel (born 1950) became the national secretary of Red Youth. Inside Red Youth two wings emerged. On one side stood the 'terrorists', who were inspired by the West German Red Army Faction (Rote Armee Fraktion, RAF) and who saw the strategy of urban guerrilla warfare as a path to follow to overthrow capitalism, and on the other the 'economists', who wanted to focus on socioeconomic struggles.

After the Red Youth congress in July 1971 the 'economists', based in the Red Youth branches in Amsterdam and Kampen, broke away and formed the Red Youth (Marxist-Leninist). At the same time two other Red Youth branches broke away, Rotterdam and Nijmegen, alongside the existing one in Eindhoven, where the leader was Henk Wubben.

After the splits the Red Youth was in the hands of those who wanted to develop urban guerrilla. Red Youth members received military training at Popular Front for the Liberation of Palestine camps in South Yemen from RAF instructors. They carried out a number of actions, including bomb attacks and molotov cocktail attacks. Most of their bomb attacks were focused in Eindhoven. They also targeted Japanese emperor Hirohito on his state visit to the Netherlands in 1971, burning Japanese flags in front of cameras and a bomb being placed at his hotel, which failed to explode. However, no-one was ever killed in any of the Red Youth's actions.

In September 1972 they blew up the car of the Eindhoven police commissioner, J. Odekerken, and the residence of the mayor, Herman Witte. Then on 17 October they planted a bomb under the car of Philips commissioner J.G. Bavinck. American-owned targets in Utrecht and Rotterdam were also bombed, for which the group claims it was directed at "U.S. imperialism, in particular Vietnam and Chile." Nobody was injured in these attacks, but it caused much hysteria and a high number of further false bomb alerts in October. After these attacks, in December 1972, Van Hoesel was arrested and was later sentenced to two years in jail for possession of weapons and illegal explosives.

Red Youth set up front organizations such as Rode Hulp (Red Aid), giving assistance to prisoners, and Rood Verzetsfront (Red Resistance Front). Through the latter Red Youth conducted protest actions in support of Van Hoesel and RAF prisoners. In June 1973, the group was severely weakened following the arrest of member Ger Flokstra, who was carrying bomb supplies in a plan to bomb American targets. The belief of infiltrated informants in the group caused paranoia and distrust between the members of Red Youth. Officially, the organisation was disbanded on 14 March 1974 – however some members continued activities with the Red Aid organisation.
