= Marxist–Leninist Party of the Netherlands =

The Marxist–Leninist Party of the Netherlands (Dutch: Marxistisch-Leninistische Partij van Nederland or MLPN) was a fake pro-China communist party in the Netherlands set up by the Dutch secret service BVD to develop contacts with the Chinese government for espionage purposes. The MLPN existed from 1968 to the early 1990s and was led throughout its existence by Pieter Boevé, who used the pseudonym Chris Petersen.

Boevé joined the Dutch secret service in 1955 after attending 5th World Festival of Youth and Students in Warsaw. Prior to the MLPN's creation, he served as the international secretary of the Marxist-Leninist Centre of the Netherlands (MLCN), using his position to create contacts in China and Albania. He also started his own publication, De Kommunist, in 1966, against the wishes of his MLCN comrades. He was subsequently expelled from the party and formed his own League of Marxist-Leninists in the Netherlands (Liga van Marxisten-Leninisten in Nederland) in 1968. A year later, this party changed its name to the MLPN.

The MLPN claimed to represent the principles of Maoism against the "heresies" of the official pro-USSR Communist Party of the Netherlands. It never had more than a dozen real members, none of whom were aware of its actual purpose. Notwithstanding this, Boevé was able to cultivate many contacts within the Chinese government. He frequently received gifts and travelling expenses from the Chinese government and on one occasion was the guest of honour at a banquet presided over by Zhou Enlai.

The BVD dissolved the MLPN shortly after the fall of the Berlin Wall in 1989, when they judged that it was no longer necessary. Boevé and another former BVD member went public with the true story of the party in 2004.

Boevé has claimed that he helped to facilitate the historic meeting of Richard Nixon and Mao Zedong in 1972. Prior to Nixon's decision to go to China, Boevé was asked by his Chinese contacts as to his views on the possibility of better relations with the United States of America. He took this as a sign that the Chinese government was interested in improving relations between the two countries and passed his information on to the CIA.

The MLPN published a monthly periodical called De Kommunist (The Communist). It was entirely written by BVD operatives.
