= Socialist Party (Netherlands) =

Political party in the Netherlands

Socialist Party Socialistische Partij
- Abbreviation: SP
- Leader: Jimmy Dijk (list)
- Chairman: Lieke van Rossum
- Secretary: Nils Müller
- Leader in the Senate: Rik Janssen
- Leader in the House of Representatives: Jimmy Dijk
- Founder: Daan Monjé
- Founded: 22 October 1971
- Split from: Communist Unity Movement of the Netherlands (Marxist–Leninist)
- Headquarters: De Moed Partijbureau SP Snouckaertlaan 70, Amersfoort
- Think tank: Scientific Office of the SP
- Youth wing: SP Jongeren (2022–present); ROOD (Note: It has not been funded by the SP since November 2020.) (2003–2021)
- Membership (2026): ▼28,380
- Ideology: Democratic socialism; Left-wing populism; Social democracy; Cultural conservatism
- Political position: Left-wing
- Regional affiliation: Socialists, Greens and Democrats; PSOM (historical)
- European affiliation: European Left Alliance for the People and the Planet
- European Parliament group: European United Left/Nordic Green Left (1999–2019)
- Colours: Crimson
- Senate: 3 / 75
- House of Representatives: 3 / 150
- States-Provincial: 22 / 570
- European Parliament: 0 / 31
- King's Commissioners: 1 / 12
- Benelux Parliament: 1 / 21

Website
- sp.nl international.sp.nl
- Politics of the Netherlands; Political parties; Elections; A: SP has been variously described as left-wing, "old left", and left-conservative; the latter label is due its more conservative stances on socio-cultural issues.

The Socialist Party (Dutch: Socialistische Partij [soːɕaːˈlɪstisə pɑrˈtɛi]; SP [ɛsˈpeː]) is a democratic socialist political party in the Netherlands. Founded in 1971 as the Communist Party of the Netherlands/Marxist–Leninist (KPN/ML, Dutch: Communistische Partij van Nederland/Marxistisch–Leninistisch), the party has since moderated itself from Marxism–Leninism and Maoism towards democratic socialism and social democracy.

Positioned to the political left of the Labour Party, the party has been part of the parliamentary opposition since it was formed. After the 2006 Dutch general election, the SP became one of the major parties of the Netherlands winning 25 out of 150 parliamentary seats, an increase of 16 seats. The SP delegation shrank over the next elections, reaching three seats in 2025.

== History ==
=== Foundation until 1994 ===
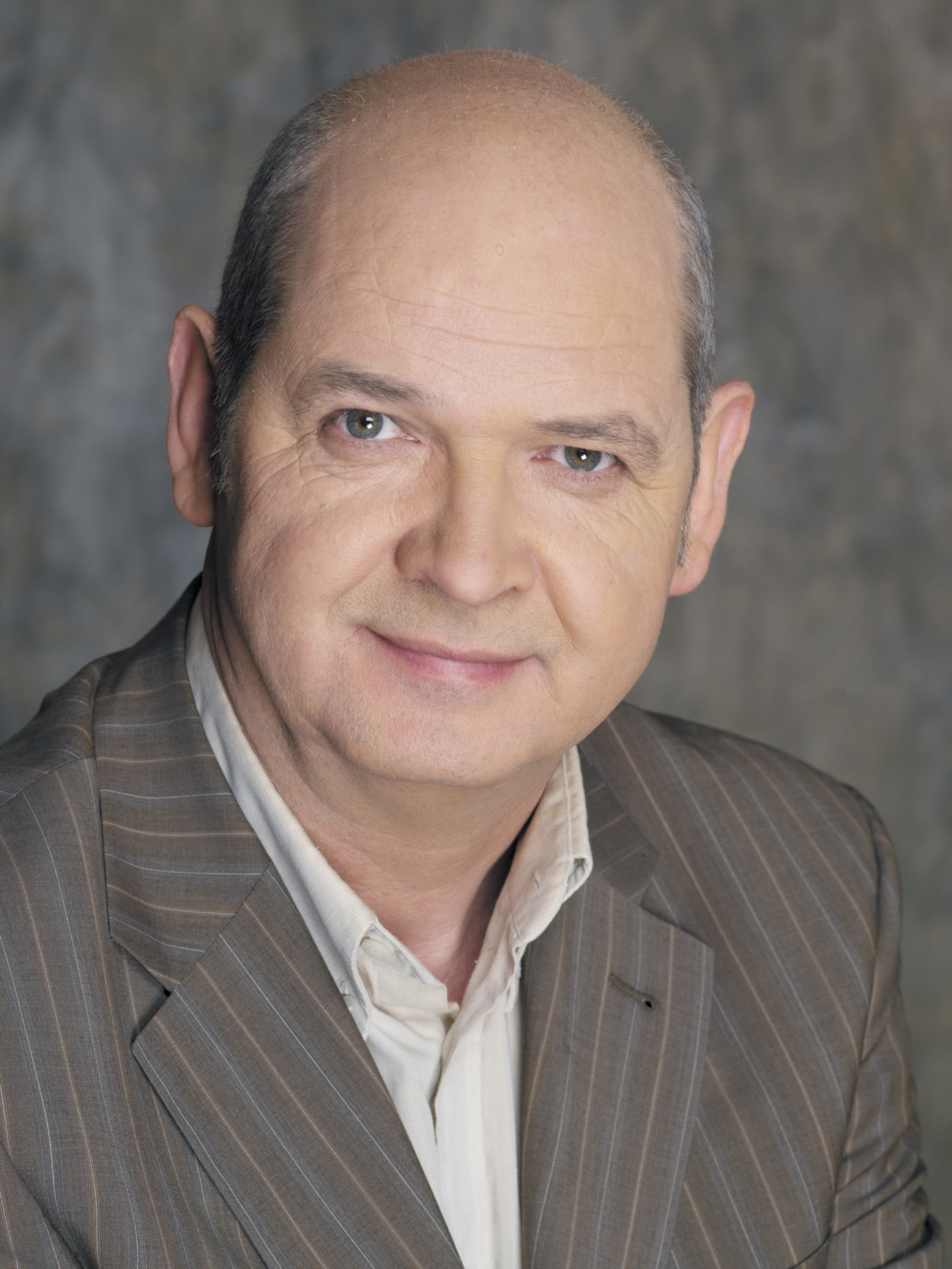
Jan Marijnissen

The Socialist Party was founded in October 1971 as a Maoist party named the Communist Party of the Netherlands/Marxist–Leninist (KPN/ML). This KPN/ML was formed following a split from the Communist Unity Movement of the Netherlands (Marxist–Leninist). The issue that provoked the split from KEN(ml) was an intense debate on the role of intellectuals in the class struggle. The founders of KPN/ML, with Daan Monjé in a prominent role, belonged to the proletarian wing of the KEN(ml), who did not want an organisation dominated by students and intellectuals. In 1972, the KPN/ML changed its name to the Socialist Party (Dutch: Socialistiese Partij). Even in its early years, while adhering to Maoist principles such as organising the masses, the SP was very critical of the Chinese Communist Party, condemning its support for UNITA in Angola with the brochure "Antwoord aan de dikhuiden van de KEN" ('Answer to the thick skins of the KEN').

The SP started to build a network of local parties, with strong local roots. The SP had its own General Practitioners' offices, provided advice to citizens and set up local action groups. This developed within front organisations, separate trade unions, environmental organisations and tenant associations. This work resulted in a strong representation in several municipal legislatures, notably in Oss. Also in some States-Provincial, the SP gained a foothold, especially in the province of North Brabant.

Since 1977, SP attempted to enter the House of Representatives, but the party failed in 1977, 1981, 1982, 1986 and 1989. In 1991, the SP officially scrapped the term Marxism–Leninism because the members felt that the term was no longer appropriate.

=== Rise in support 1994–2012 ===
Logo of the SP from circa 1993 to 2006

In the 1994 general election, the party's first members of parliament, namely Remi Poppe and Jan Marijnissen, were elected. Its slogan was "Vote Against" (Dutch: Stem tegen). In the 1990s, the major party of the Dutch left, the Labour Party (PvdA), moved to the centre, making the SP and the GroenLinks viable alternatives for some left-wing voters. In the 1998 general election, the party was rewarded for its opposition to the purple government of the first Kok cabinet and more than doubled its seats to five. In the 1999 European Parliament election, Erik Meijer was elected into the European Parliament for the SP.

In the 2002 general election, the SP ran with the slogan "Vote in Favor" (Dutch: Stem Voor). The party nearly doubled to nine seats. This result was kept in the 2003 general election. Leading up to the latter election, the SP was predicted to win as many as 24 (16%) seats in the polls. However, these gains failed to materialise as many potential SP voters chose to cast strategic votes for the Labour Party which stood a good chance of winning the elections. In the 2004 European Parliament election, its one seat was doubled to two.

In the 2005 referendum on the European Constitution, the SP was the only left-wing party in parliament to oppose it. Support for the party grew in opinion polls, but it fell slightly after the referendum.

The 2006 municipal elections were a success for the SP which more than doubled its total number of seats. This can in part be explained by the party standing in many more municipalities, but it can also be seen as a reaction to the so-called "right-wing winter" in national politics as the welfare reforms of the right-wing second Balkenende cabinet were called by its centre-left and left-wing opponents. In a reaction to these results, Marijnissen declared on election night that the "SP has grown up".

After the untimely end of the second Balkenende cabinet and the minority government of the third Balkenende cabinet, the SP gained 16 seats in the parliament after the 2006 general election, nearly tripling its parliamentary representation. With 25 seats, the SP became the third largest party of the Dutch parliament. In the 2006–2007 cabinet formation, the SP was unable to work out its policy differences with the Christian Democratic Appeal (CDA) and remained in opposition against the fourth Balkenende cabinet which comprised the CDA, the PvdA and the Christian Union parties.

In the 2007 provincial elections, the SP gained 54 provincial legislators more than in the 2003 provincial elections and made it to a total of 83 provincial legislators. As a result of the provincial elections, the SP has increased its representatives in the Senate of the Netherlands (upper house) to 11 from the 4 it had previously.

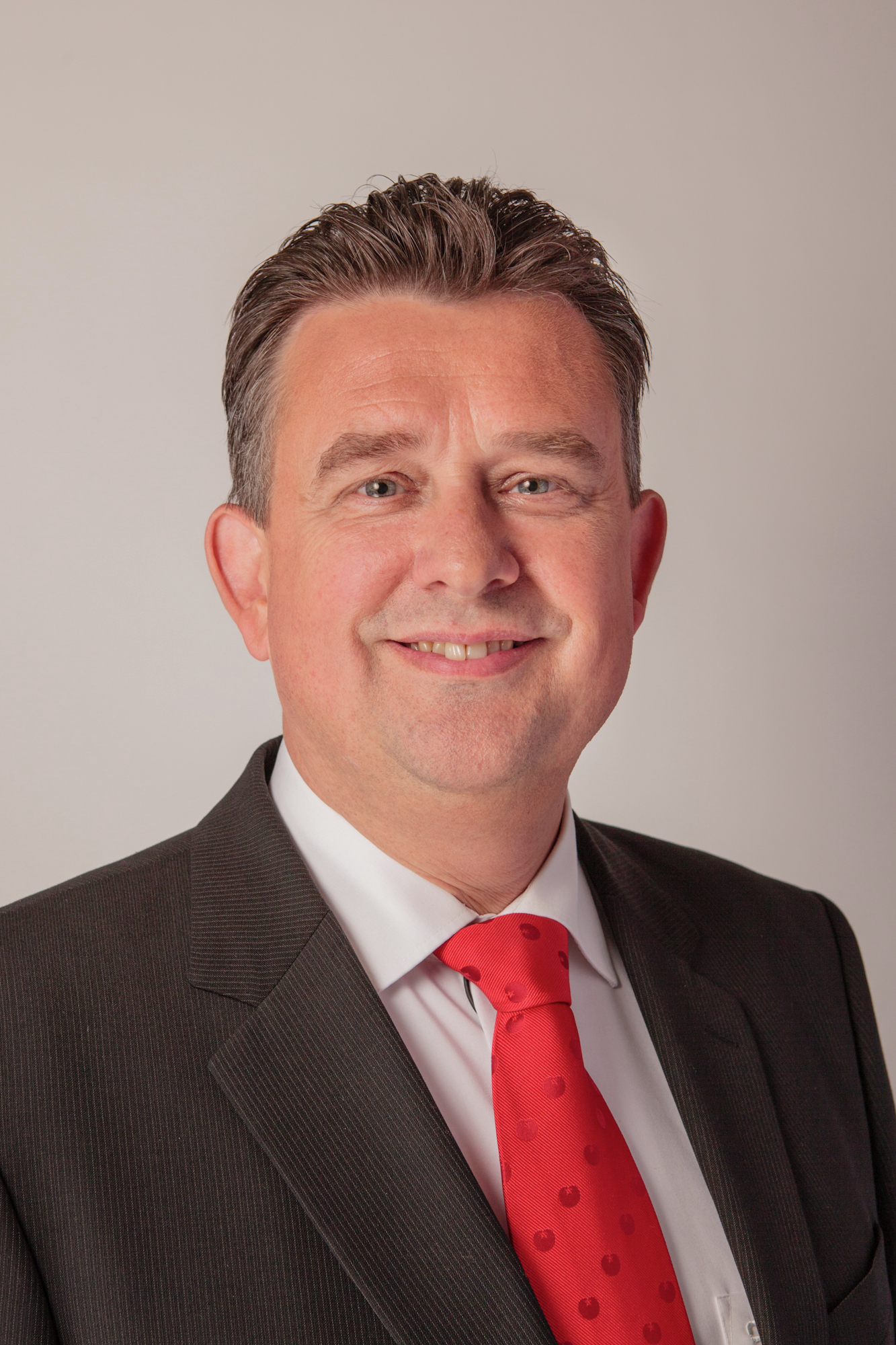
Emile Roemer

In the 2010 general election, the SP fared worse than in the previous election, with a loss of 10 seats, a gain of 15 and only 9.9% of the overall vote. The party's popularity rose after the election, with polls throughout 2012 indicating it could challenge the ruling VVD with a seat count reaching into the 30s. The SP's popularity peaked in early August, a month before the election, with polls from Peil, Ipsos, and TNS NIPO indicating it would become the largest party with a result as high as 37 seats. However, PvdA's popularity surged in the final weeks, and the SP's lead collapsed. The party ultimately placed fourth on 15 seats, with a slight decrease in its vote share compared to 2010.

=== Decline (2012–present) ===
In the 2017 general election, the SP lost one seat and finished sixth.

At the 2021 general election, the party returned to the nine seats it held before 2006.

After the 2023 Dutch general election, the SP delegation shrank from nine seats to five. The party experienced further losses in the 2025 snap election under current leader Jimmy Dijk, with their seat count almost halving from five to three.

== Ideology ==
The SP has been described as socialist, democratic socialist, social democratic, left-wing populist, left-wing conservative, and Eurosceptic. It advocates for the Netherlands to become a republic. The party labels itself as socialist, and in its manifesto of principles, it calls for a society where human dignity, equality and solidarity are most important. Its core issues are employment, social welfare and investing in health care, public education and public safety. The party opposes privatisation of public services and is critical of globalisation. It has taken a soft Eurosceptic stance. The SP is also opposed to capitalism, as noted in what the SP calls its three main tasks:

In a world dominated by the interests of capital, human dignity, equality and solidarity are under pressure. Our goal is to build a modern socialist society in which we put these values into practice. To achieve this, the SP has three main tasks:

1. Providing fundamental criticism of capitalism and organizing people against it
2. Presenting our alternatives for the short and long term and fighting for them
3. Collaborate with everyone who endorses our values, locally, nationally and internationally.

Capitalism leads to exploitation of people and division in society; pollution of the environment and depletion of the earth. The preservation of life is under pressure due to the overexploitation of current capitalism. This leads to destruction of the environment, to wars and flows of refugees. Our way of life must change to save nature and thus humans. More and more people are coming to the realization that the capitalist market economy does not work.

According to Cas Mudde, the party has an "old left" platform that combines left-wing economic stances with "left-conservative" positions on some social issues — the party proposes a temporary stop on migrant workers, and it also rejects "identity politics". It has also been described as left-conservative by Renewal, and by Ipsos. The party's program is heavily focused on Dutch blue collar workers, recalling a 'historical homeland' of Dutch workers that was destroyed by privatisation, deregulation and neoliberalism; in the same vein, the party is critical of the EU, calling its policies 'false internationalism' and accusing it of being in the service of big corporations and neoliberalism. The party's opposition to mass migration is explained by its focus on the protection of the working class; the SP argues that the Dutch working class must be protected by preventing an inflow of cheap labour into the Netherlands; party's slogan on immigration is "Class struggle instead of race struggle". In 2025, political scientist Thomas Buser classified the party as economically socialist while almost as socially conservative as the Christian Union. The Socialist Party is also regarded as a textbook example of a left-wing populist party, and is also considered populist socialist.

=== Social issues ===
Because of its social stances, the party has been described as culturally conservative. Political scientist Jan Philipp Thomeczek compares the party to the German Sahra Wagenknecht Alliance, classifying both as left-authoritarian, i.e. economically left-wing and culturally conservative, parties. Apart from campaigning on restricting immigration, the SP opposes climate change measures that it considers unfair or disadvantageous to the working class. It also strongly opposes a "European superstate" and demands the return of the Dutch national currency, the Dutch guilder; in addition, the party supports border controls within the EU, and advocates introducing a work permit requirement for people entering the Netherlands from other EU countries.

Given the party's social stances, its voter base consists of low-income and working-class Catholics of the Southern Netherlands, as well as trade union members. It combines its social stances with an anti-neoliberal rhetoric, demanding the end of the elite's "pillage of the state, deception, and flogging off its people to a cabal of foreign capitalists".

=== Economic issues ===
The SP is anti-capitalist, and adheres to a socialist economic agenda. Its main economic postulate is "drastic reduction in the enormous disparities in incomes and assets". It proposed a maximum wage, demanding that the highest salaries of private-sector executive be no more than ten times the salary of the lowest-paid employee; in case of the public sector, SP proposed that managers should earn no more than cabinet ministers. It also postulated a 65 percent tax on incomes above €150,000, and limitation of tax deduction for mortgage interest payments by removing it for mortgages above €350,000, denouncing it as "villa subsidy". Since 1974, the party has instituted a pay cap for all MPs and elected officials. Any salary in excess of the cap is donated to the party to be used for mutual aid.

The party also proposes an increase of minimum wage, social welfare benefits and old age security payment by the state, along with protecting employment rights by allowing flexible work contrasts to become eligible for a permanent contact more easily. The SP also criticizes the presence of market force in the healthcare system, arguing for a national health insurance with income-dependent insurance premiums and no personal contributions instead. The SP has also been a vocal opponent of the new Dutch pension law calling it casino pensions, the party also has calls for the retirement age to be lowered back to 65 and for AOW income to be coupled to the minimum-wage.

=== Other stances ===
The party has increased its opposition towards further armament of Europe since the 2020s, stating that Europe already has enough weapons to defend itself from any potential aggressors and only needs limited investments into its military instead of the mass-rearmament program that the European Commission has proposed. The SP has also strongly expressed its opposition to the war in Gaza and expressed support for the recognition of a Palestinian state. The party's leader Dijk has, among others in the party, called the war a genocide.

=== Relationships with other parties ===
The SP has always been in opposition on a national level, although there are now numerous examples of government participation on a local and provincial level. On many issues, the SP is the most left-wing party in parliament. Between 1994 and 2002, the Labour Party (PvdA) had a conscious strategy to isolate the party, always voting against the latter's proposals. However, the party did co-operate well with GroenLinks. After its disastrous election result in 2002, the PvdA, now back in opposition, did co-operate with the SP against some of the policies of the centre-right Balkenende government and their relationship improved significantly. New tensions arose after the 2006 general election, when the SP approached the PvdA in electoral support and the PvdA joined the government whereas the SP did not.

== Election results ==
=== House of Representatives ===
Election	Lead candidate	List	Votes	%	Seats	+/–	Government
1977	Remi Poppe	List	24,420	0.29	0 / 150	New	No seats
1981	Hans van Hooft Sr.	List	30,357	0.35	0 / 150	Steady	No seats
1982	Hans van Hooft Sr.	List	44,690	0.55	0 / 150	Steady	No seats
1986	Hans van Hooft Sr.	List	31,983	0.35	0 / 150	Steady	No seats
1989	Jan Marijnissen	List	38,789	0.44	0 / 150	Steady	No seats
1994	Jan Marijnissen	List	118,768	1.32	2 / 150	▲2	Opposition
1998	Jan Marijnissen	List	303,703	3.53	5 / 150	▲3	Opposition
2002	Jan Marijnissen	List	560,447	5.90	9 / 150	▲4	Opposition
2003	Jan Marijnissen	List	609,723	6.32	9 / 150	Steady	Opposition
2006	Jan Marijnissen	List	1,630,803	16.58	25 / 150	▲16	Opposition
2010	Emile Roemer	List	924,696	9.82	15 / 150	▼10	Opposition
2012	Emile Roemer	List	909,853	9.65	15 / 150	Steady	Opposition
2017	Emile Roemer	List	955,633	9.09	14 / 150	▼1	Opposition
2021	Lilian Marijnissen	List	623,436	5.98	9 / 150	▼5	Opposition
2023	Lilian Marijnissen	List	328,225	3.15	5 / 150	▼4	Opposition
2025	Jimmy Dijk	List	199,585	1.89	3 / 150	▼2	Opposition

=== Senate ===
Election	Votes	%	Seats	+/–
1991			0 / 75	New
1995			1 / 75	▲1
1999	4,801	3.0	2 / 75	▲1
2003	8,551	5.3	4 / 75	▲2
2007	25,231	15.47	12 / 75	▲8
2011	17,187	10.35	8 / 75	▼4
2015	20,038	11.9	9 / 75	▲1
2019	10,179	5,88	4 / 75	▼5
2023	7,404	4.14	3 / 75	▼1

=== European Parliament ===
Election	List	Votes	%	Seats	+/–	EP Group
1989	List	34,332	0.65	0 / 26	New	–
1994	List	55,311	1.34	0 / 26	0	–
1999	List	178,642	5.04	1 / 26	▲1	GUE/NGL
2004	List	332,326	6.97	2 / 26	▲1	GUE/NGL
2009	List	323,269	7.10	2 / 25	0	GUE/NGL
2014	List	458,079	9.64	2 / 26	0	GUE/NGL
2019	List	185,224	3.37	0 / 26	▼2	–
2019	List	185,224	3.37	0 / 29	0	–
2024	List	136,978	2.20	0 / 31	0	–

== Representation ==
=== Members of the European Parliament ===
The party currently has no members of the European Parliament since the 2024 European Parliamentary election.

=== Local and provincial government ===
Former SP leader Emile Roemer was the first party member who became both mayor and commissioner (he was acting mayor of Heerlen and Alkmaar, and has been King's Commissioner of Limburg since 1 December 2021). The SP is part of the provincial executive (Gedeputeerde staten) in two out of twelve provinces (Limburg and North Brabant). The SP is also part of several municipal executives (College van burgemeester en wethouders).

== Organisation ==
=== Name ===
The party was founded as the Communist Party of the Netherlands/Marxist–Leninist (KPN/ML) in 1971. In 1972, it adopted the Socialist Party name (Dutch: Socialistiese Partij), with the spelling using -iese instead of -ische. This was due to the Dutch spelling reforms at the time. However, these spelling reforms failed and the party changed its name to Socialistische Partij in 1993.

=== Leadership ===
- Chairmen
  - Hans van Hooft Sr. (22 October 1971 – 20 May 1988)
  - Jan Marijnissen (20 May 1988 – 28 November 2015)
  - Ron Meyer (28 November 2015 – 14 December 2019)
  - Jannie Visscher (14 December 2019 – 2 March 2024)
  - Lieke van Rossum (since 2 March 2024)
- Secretaries
  - Tiny Kox (20 January 1994 – 24 May 2003)
  - Paulus Jansen (24 May 2003 – 20 June 2005)
  - Hans van Heijningen (20 June 2005 – 20 January 2018)
  - Lieke Smits (acting, 20 January 2018 – 14 December 2019)
  - Arnout Hoekstra (14 December 2019 – 2 March 2024)
  - Nils Müller (since 2 March 2024)
- Parliamentary leaders in the Senate
  - Jan de Wit (13 June 1995 – 19 May 1998)
  - Bob Ruers (19 May 1998 – 10 June 2003)
  - Tiny Kox (10 June 2003 – 25 January 2022)
  - Rik Janssen (since 25 January 2022)
- Parliamentary leaders in the House of Representatives
  - Jan Marijnissen (17 May 1994 – 20 June 2008)
  - Agnes Kant (20 June 2008 – 5 March 2010)
  - Emile Roemer (5 March 2010 – 13 December 2017)
  - Lilian Marijnissen (13 December 2017 – 9 December 2023)
  - Jimmy Dijk (since 13 December 2023)

=== Membership ===
As of 2016, the SP has 41,710 members and has grown considerably since it entered parliament in 1994, making it the third largest party in terms of its number of members. Like other parties in the Netherlands, the SP has seen a decline in membership in recent years.

=== Organisational structure ===
The highest body within the SP is the party council, formed by the chairs of all local branches and the party board. It convenes at least four times a year. The party board is elected by the party congress which is formed by delegates from the municipal branches. The congress decides on the order of the candidates for national and European elections and it has a final say over the party program.

The SP is a constant active force in extra-parliamentary protest. Many of its members are active in local campaigning groups, often independent groups dominated by the SP, or in the SP neighbourhood centres, where the party provides help for the working class.

An example more of nationwide nature is the movement for a National Healthcare Fund (Dutch: Nationaal ZorgFonds). This campaign demonstrates the necessity of a single payer system and wants to remove market and commercialisation aspects of the current healthcare system. The expensive advertising annually organised by healthcare insurance companies in order to attract new customers is a big example. The NHS inspired movement thinks that money should solely be spent on healthcare itself. Switching from one insurance company to another can only be done once every year as restricted by Dutch law.

=== Linked organisations ===
The youth wing of the Socialist Party is called SP Jongeren. Its old youth-wing was ROOD; the word rood is officially written in capitals but is not an acronym. The SP publishes the magazine the Tribune monthly which was also the name of a historical Communist Party of the Netherlands newspaper. The relationship between Rood and the SP became rocky in 2020 due to the youth wing taking a more radical approach to politics. In late 2020 the party cut ties with ROOD.

==== Splinter groups ====
At one point, two Trotskyist entryist groups operated within the SP. This included Offensive, now called Socialist Alternative, and the International Socialists. The latter was expelled on the grounds of double membership. The similar yet very small group Offensief was not considered a factor of power, but its members were banned from the SP in February 2009, on the grounds of being "a party within a party". Members of the party Socialist Alternative Politics still operate within the SP.
