= List of members of the House of Representatives of the Netherlands, 2021–2023 =

House of Representatives, 2021–2023
| ← | 2017–2021 | 2023–2025 | → |

Overview
- Legislative body: House of Representatives
- Term: 31 March 2021 – 5 December 2023
- Election: 2021
- Government: Fourth Rutte cabinet List: VVD: 34; D66: 24; CDA: 14; Omtzigt (ex-CDA): 1; CU: 5
- Opposition: List: PVV: 16; Helder (BBB, ex-PVV): 1; SP: 9; PvdA: 9; GL: 8; FvD: 5; Groep Van Haga (ex-FvD): 2; Ephraim (ex-Groep Van Haga, ex-FvD): 1; PvdD: 6; BIJ1: 1; Denk: 3; SGP: 3; JA21: 1; Eppink & Pouw-Verweij (BBB, ex-JA21): 2; Volt: 2; Gündoğan (ex-Volt): 1; Den Haan (ex-50+): 1; BBB: 1
- Members: 150
- Speaker of the House of Representatives: Vera Bergkamp

Between 31 March 2021 and 5 December 2023, 187 individuals served in the House of Representatives, the 150-seat lower house of the States General of the Netherlands. Vera Bergkamp was elected Speaker of the House of Representatives for this period.

The members were elected during the general election of 17 March 2021. Sixteen parties were elected to the House, the highest number since 1918. After the election, the Fourth Rutte cabinet was formed for this term, consisting of People's Party for Freedom and Democracy (VVD, 34 seats), Democrats 66 (D66, 24 seats), Christian Democratic Appeal (CDA, 15 seats) and Christian Union (CU, 5 seats). Four new parties entered the political body after the election, namely Volt (3 seats), JA21 (3 seats), the Farmer–Citizen Movement (1 seat) and BIJ1 (1 seat). The rest of the opposition consisted of the Party for Freedom (17), the Socialist Party (9), the Labour Party (9), GroenLinks (8), Forum for Democracy (8), the Party for the Animals (6), the Reformed Political Party (3), DENK (3) and 50PLUS (1).

During the term, six members switched their parliamentary group affiliation, changing the party composition of the House of Representatives. 50PLUS lost its seat in May 2021 due to Liane den Haan continuing as an independent politician. Forum for Democracy lost three seats that same month, as three of its members formed the independent caucus Groep Van Haga. The CDA lost a seat in September 2021 as a result of Pieter Omtzigt leaving the party, while Volt lost a seat in February 2022 due to its expulsion of Nilüfer Gündoğan. On 2 August 2023, Olaf Ephraim left the Groep Van Haga and continued as independent member. On 1 September 2023 Lilian Helder (PVV), Nicki Pouw-Verweij and Derk Jan Eppink (both JA21) switched to BBB, giving it four seats. With a peak of 21, this parliamentary term had a record number of parliamentary groups.

== Members ==
All members are sworn in at the start of the term, even if they are not new. Assumed office in this list therefore refers to the swearing in during this term, while all members are automatically considered to have left office at the end of the term.

| Name | Parliamentary group | Assumed office | Term end | Ref. |
|---|---|---|---|---|
| Thierry Aartsen | VVD | 31 March 2021 | 5 December 2023 | |
| Fleur Agema | PVV | 31 March 2021 | 5 December 2023 | |
| Eva Akerboom | PvdD | 13 October 2022 | 1 February 2023 (Note: Temporarily replaced Esther Ouwehand) | |
| Eva Akerboom | PvdD | 10 May 2023 | 10 August 2023 (Note: Temporarily replaced Leonie Vestering) | |
| Mahir Alkaya | SP | 31 March 2021 | 5 December 2023 | |
| Mustafa Amhaouch | CDA | 31 March 2021 | 5 December 2023 | |
| Khadija Arib | PvdA | 31 March 2021 | 3 November 2022 (Note: Left after allegations of transgressive behaviour) | |
| Tamara van Ark | VVD | 31 March 2021 | 3 September 2021 (Note: Left for medical reasons) | |
| Farid Azarkan | DENK | 31 March 2021 | 5 December 2023 | |
| Stephan van Baarle | DENK | 31 March 2021 | 5 December 2023 | |
| Thierry Baudet | FVD | 31 March 2021 | 5 December 2023 | |
| Bente Becker | VVD | 31 March 2021 | 8 August 2022 (Note: Went on parental leave) | |
| Bente Becker | VVD | 28 November 2022 | 5 December 2023 | |
| Sandra Beckerman | SP | 31 March 2021 | 5 December 2023 | |
| Harm Beertema | PVV | 31 March 2021 | 5 December 2023 | |
| Salima Belhaj | D66 | 31 March 2021 | 5 December 2023 | |
| Joba van den Berg | CDA | 29 April 2021 | 16 August 2021 (Note: Temporarily replaced Harry van der Molen) | |
| Joba van den Berg | CDA | 7 September 2021 | 5 December 2023 | |
| Vera Bergkamp | D66 | 31 March 2021 | 5 December 2023 | |
| Marijke van Beukering | D66 | 21 April 2021 | 1 June 2023 | |
| Harry Bevers | VVD | 18 January 2022 | 5 December 2023 | |
| Yvonne Bijenhof | VVD | 12 September 2023 | 5 December 2023 | |
| Mirjam Bikker | CU | 31 March 2021 | 5 December 2023 | |
| Roelof Bisschop | SGP | 31 March 2021 | 5 December 2023 | |
| Henri Bontenbal | CDA | 1 June 2021 | 14 September 2021 (Note: Temporarily replaced Pieter Omtzigt) | |
| Henri Bontenbal | CDA | 29 September 2021 | 27 December 2021 (Note: Temporarily replaced Harry van der Molen) | |
| Henri Bontenbal | CDA | 18 January 2022 | 5 December 2023 | |
| Martin Bosma | PVV | 31 March 2021 | 5 December 2023 | |
| Derk Boswijk | CDA | 31 March 2021 | 5 December 2023 | |
| Kauthar Bouchallikht | GL (Note: Until 27 October 2023) | 31 March 2021 | 5 December 2023 | |
| Kauthar Bouchallikht | GL-PvdA (Note: Since 27 October 2023) | 31 March 2021 | 5 December 2023 | |
| Raoul Boucke | D66 | 31 March 2021 | 5 December 2023 | |
| Faissal Boulakjar | D66 | 31 March 2021 | 5 December 2023 | |
| Ernst Boutkan | VOLT | 16 March 2023 | 4 July 2023 (Note: Temporarily replaced Marieke Koekkoek) | |
| Ruben Brekelmans | VVD | 31 March 2021 | 5 December 2023 | |
| Carline van Breugel | D66 | 25 October 2023 | 5 December 2023 | |
| Bart van den Brink | CDA | 10 May 2023 | 5 December 2023 | |
| Laura Bromet | GL | 31 March 2021 | 5 December 2023 | |
| Laura Bromet | GL-PvdA | 31 March 2021 | 5 December 2023 | |
| Julian Bushoff | PvdA | 22 November 2022 | 5 December 2023 | |
| Julian Bushoff | GL-PvdA | 22 November 2022 | 5 December 2023 | |
| Thom van Campen | VVD | 31 March 2021 | 5 December 2023 | |
| Don Ceder | CU | 31 March 2021 | 5 December 2023 | |
| Laurens Dassen | VOLT | 31 March 2021 | 5 December 2023 | |
| Ralf Dekker | FVD | 23 August 2022 | 27 March 2023 (Note: Temporarily replaced Simone Kerseboom) | |
| Hind Dekker-Abdulaziz | D66 | 25 January 2022 | 5 December 2023 | |
| Teun van Dijck | PVV | 31 March 2021 | 5 December 2023 | |
| Gijs van Dijk | PvdA | 31 March 2021 | 14 February 2022 | |
| Inge van Dijk | CDA | 31 March 2021 | 5 December 2023 | |
| Jasper van Dijk | SP | 31 March 2021 | 29 March 2023 (Note: Went on sick leave) | |
| Jasper van Dijk | SP | 20 July 2023 | 5 December 2023 | |
| Jimmy Dijk | SP | 20 April 2023 | 5 December 2023 | |
| Nico Drost | CU | 25 January 2023 | 5 December 2023 | |
| Joost Eerdmans | JA21 | 31 March 2021 | 5 December 2023 | |
| Corinne Ellemeet | GL | 31 March 2021 | 5 December 2023 | |
| Corinne Ellemeet | GL-PvdA | 31 March 2021 | 5 December 2023 | |
| Ulysse Ellian | VVD | 31 March 2021 | 5 December 2023 | |
| Olaf Ephraim | FVD (Note: Until 13 May 2021) | 31 March 2021 | 5 December 2023 | |
| Olaf Ephraim | Groep-Van Haga (Note: From 13 May 2021 until 2 Augustus 2023) | 31 March 2021 | 5 December 2023 | |
| Olaf Ephraim | Lid Ephraim (Note: Starting on 2 August 2023) | 31 March 2021 | 5 December 2023 | |
| Derk Jan Eppink | JA21 (Note: Until 31 August 2023) | 31 March 2021 | 5 December 2023 | |
| Derk Jan Eppink | BBB (Note: Starting 1 September 2023) | 31 March 2021 | 5 December 2023 | |
| Silvio Erkens | VVD | 31 March 2021 | 5 December 2023 | |
| Eva van Esch | PvdD | 31 March 2021 | 5 December 2023 | |
| Sietse Fritsma | PVV | 31 March 2021 | 5 December 2023 | |
| Frank Futselaar | SP | 30 March 2023 | 19 July 2023 | |
| Jaco Geurts | CDA | 31 March 2021 | 9 May 2023 (Note: Left to become interim mayor of Maasdriel) | |
| Lisa van Ginneken | D66 | 31 March 2021 | 5 December 2023 | |
| Maarten Goudzwaard | JA21 | 10 March 2022 | 30 June 2022 (Note: Temporarily replaced Nicki Pouw-Verweij) | |
| Machiel de Graaf | PVV | 31 March 2021 | 5 December 2023 | |
| Stieneke van der Graaf | CU | 18 January 2022 | 5 December 2023 | |
| Dion Graus | PVV | 31 March 2021 | 5 December 2023 | |
| Martijn Grevink | VVD | 23 August 2022 | 5 December 2023 | |
| Pieter Grinwis | CU | 31 March 2021 | 5 December 2023 | |
| Peter de Groot | VVD | 31 March 2021 | 5 December 2023 | |
| Tjeerd de Groot | D66 | 1 April 2021 (Note: He was not sworn in on 31 March 2021, as he was unable to attend the ceremony. This was due to a family member not yet having received the result of a coronavirus test) | 5 December 2023 | |
| Nilüfer Gündoğan | VOLT (Note: Until 26 February 2022 and between 10 March and 22 March 2022) | 31 March 2021 | 5 December 2023 | |
| Nilüfer Gündoğan | Lid Gündoğan (Note: Between 26 February and 10 March 2022 and starting on 22 March 2022) | 31 March 2021 | 5 December 2023 | |
| Liane den Haan | 50+ (Note: Until 11 May 2021) | 31 March 2021 | 5 December 2023 | |
| Liane den Haan | Fractie-Den Haan (Note: Starting on 11 May 2021) | 31 March 2021 | 5 December 2023 | |
| Wybren van Haga | FVD | 31 March 2021 | 5 December 2023 | |
| Wybren van Haga | Groep-Van Haga (Note: Starting on 13 May 2021) | 31 March 2021 | 5 December 2023 | |
| Kiki Hagen | D66 | 31 March 2021 | 5 December 2023 | |
| Alexander Hammelburg | D66 | 31 March 2021 | 5 December 2023 | |
| Mark Harbers | VVD | 31 March 2021 | 10 January 2022 (Note: Left to join the cabinet) | |
| Erik Haverkort | VVD | 18 January 2022 | 5 December 2023 | |
| Rudmer Heerema | VVD | 31 March 2021 | 5 December 2023 | |
| Pieter Heerma | CDA | 31 March 2021 | 5 December 2023 | |
| Eelco Heinen | VVD | 31 March 2021 | 5 December 2023 | |
| Lilian Helder | PVV | 31 March 2021 | 5 December 2023 | |
| Lilian Helder | BBB | 31 March 2021 | 5 December 2023 | |
| Sophie Hermans | VVD | 31 March 2021 | 5 December 2023 | |
| Maarten Hijink | SP | 31 March 2021 | 20 April 2023 (Note: Left to improve work-life balance) | |
| Jacqueline van den Hil | VVD | 31 March 2021 | 5 December 2023 | |
| Wopke Hoekstra | CDA | 31 March 2021 | 10 January 2022 | |
| Habtamu de Hoop | PvdA | 31 March 2021 | 5 December 2023 | |
| Habtamu de Hoop | GL-PvdA | 31 March 2021 | 5 December 2023 | |
| Pepijn van Houwelingen | FVD | 31 March 2021 | 5 December 2023 | |
| Folkert Idsinga | VVD | 31 March 2021 | 5 September 2023 | |
| Freek Jansen | FVD | 31 March 2021 | 5 December 2023 | |
| Rob Jetten | D66 | 31 March 2021 | 10 January 2022 | |
| Léon de Jong | PVV | 31 March 2021 | 5 December 2023 | |
| Romke de Jong | D66 | 31 March 2021 | 5 December 2023 | |
| Sigrid Kaag | D66 | 31 March 2021 | 10 January 2022 | |
| Roelien Kamminga | VVD | 31 March 2021 | 5 December 2023 | |
| Hülya Kat | D66 | 31 March 2021 | 5 December 2023 | |
| Barbara Kathmann | PvdA | 31 March 2021 | 5 December 2023 | |
| Barbara Kathmann | GL-PvdA | 31 March 2021 | 5 December 2023 | |
| Mona Keijzer | CDA | 31 March 2021 | 27 September 2021 (Note: Left are being fired from the demissionary cabinet) | |
| Bart van Kent | SP | 31 March 2021 | 5 December 2023 | |
| Simone Kerseboom | FVD | 31 March 2021 | 16 August 2022 | |
| Simone Kerseboom | FVD | 28 March 2023 | 5 December 2023 | |
| Jesse Klaver | GL | 31 March 2021 | 5 December 2023 | |
| Jesse Klaver | GL-PvdA | 31 March 2021 | 5 December 2023 | |
| Jan Klink | VVD | 2 June 2021 | 5 December 2023 | |
| Raymond Knops | CDA | 31 March 2021 | 2 February 2023 (Note: Left for another job) | |
| Marieke Koekkoek | VOLT | 31 March 2021 | 14 March 2023 | |
| Marieke Koekkoek | VOLT | 5 July 2023 | 5 December 2023 | |
| Daniel Koerhuis | VVD | 31 March 2021 | 5 December 2023 | |
| Alexander Kops | PVV | 31 March 2021 | 5 December 2023 | |
| Daan de Kort | VVD | 31 March 2021 | 5 December 2023 | |
| Suzanne Kröger | GL | 27 October 2021 | 5 December 2023 | |
| Suzanne Kröger | GL-PvdA | 27 October 2021 | 5 December 2023 | |
| Harmen Krul | CDA | 7 February 2023 | 5 December 2023 | |
| Anne Kuik | CDA | 31 March 2021 | 3 May 2022 | |
| Anne Kuik | CDA | 23 August 2022 | 5 December 2023 | |
| Attje Kuiken | PvdA | 31 March 2021 | 5 December 2023 | |
| Attje Kuiken | GL-PvdA | 31 March 2021 | 5 December 2023 | |
| Tunahan Kuzu | DENK | 31 March 2021 | 5 December 2023 | |
| Peter Kwint | SP | 31 March 2021 | 5 December 2023 | |
| Jeanet van der Laan | D66 | 31 March 2021 | 5 December 2023 | |
| Tom van der Lee | GL | 31 March 2021 | 5 December 2023 | |
| Tom van der Lee | GL-PvdA | 31 March 2021 | 5 December 2023 | |
| Renske Leijten | SP | 31 March 2021 | 4 July 2023 | |
| Senna Maatoug | GL | 31 March 2021 | 5 December 2023 | |
| Senna Maatoug | GL-PvdA | 31 March 2021 | 5 December 2023 | |
| Barry Madlener | PVV | 31 March 2021 | 5 December 2023 | |
| Vicky Maeijer | PVV | 31 March 2021 | 5 December 2023 | |
| Lilian Marijnissen | SP | 31 March 2021 | 5 December 2023 | |
| Gidi Markuszower | PVV | 31 March 2021 | 5 December 2023 | |
| Paul van Meenen | D66 | 31 March 2021 | 6 June 2023 | |
| Gideon van Meijeren | FVD | 31 March 2021 | 5 December 2023 | |
| Ingrid Michon | VVD | 31 March 2021 | 5 December 2023 | |
| Fahid Minhas | VVD | 31 March 2021 | 5 December 2023 | |
| Mohammed Mohandis | PvdA | 2 June 2022 | 5 December 2023 | |
| Mohammed Mohandis | GL-PvdA | 2 June 2022 | 5 December 2023 | |
| Harry van der Molen | CDA | 31 March 2021 | 26 April 2021 | |
| Harry van der Molen | CDA | 17 August 2021 | 6 September 2021 | |
| Harry van der Molen | CDA | 28 December 2021 | 22 December 2022 | |
| Agnes Mulder | CDA | 31 March 2021 | 9 May 2023 | |
| Edgar Mulder | PVV | 31 March 2021 | 5 December 2023 | |
| Songül Mutluer | PvdA | 17 February 2022 | 5 December 2023 | |
| Songül Mutluer | GL-PvdA | 17 February 2022 | 5 December 2023 | |
| Daan de Neef | VVD | 31 March 2021 | 5 September 2022 (Note: Left after disagreeing with his party's positions) | |
| Henk Nijboer | PvdA | 31 March 2021 | 5 December 2023 | |
| Henk Nijboer | GL-PvdA | 31 March 2021 | 5 December 2023 | |
| Michiel van Nispen | SP | 31 March 2021 | 5 December 2023 | |
| Pieter Omtzigt | CDA | 31 March 2021 | 25 May 2021 | |
| Pieter Omtzigt | Lid Omtzigt | 15 September 2021 | 5 December 2023 | |
| Esther Ouwehand | PvdD | 31 March 2021 | 12 October 2022 | |
| Esther Ouwehand | PvdD | 2 February 2023 | 5 December 2023 | |
| Hilde Palland | CDA | 31 March 2021 | 5 December 2023 | |
| Jan Paternotte | D66 | 31 March 2021 | 5 December 2023 | |
| Mariëlle Paul | VVD | 31 March 2021 | 20 July 2023 | |
| Wieke Paulusma | D66 | 15 April 2021 (Note: She was not sworn in on 31 March 2021, as she was unable to attend the ceremony. This was because she had tested positive for the coronavirus the day before.) | 5 December 2023 | |
| René Peters | CDA | 31 March 2021 | 5 December 2023 | |
| Kati Piri | PvdA | 31 March 2021 | 5 December 2023 | |
| Kati Piri | GL-PvdA | 31 March 2021 | 5 December 2023 | |
| Caroline van der Plas | BBB | 31 March 2021 | 5 December 2023 | |
| Lilianne Ploumen | PvdA | 31 March 2021 | 21 April 2022 | |
| Anne-Marijke Podt | D66 | 7 September 2021 | 5 December 2023 | |
| Nicki Pouw-Verweij | JA21 | 31 March 2021 | 9 March 2022 | |
| Nicki Pouw-Verweij | JA21 | 30 June 2022 | 5 December 2023 | |
| Nicki Pouw-Verweij | BBB | 30 June 2022 | 5 December 2023 | |
| Lammert van Raan | PvdD | 31 March 2021 | 5 December 2023 | |
| Rens Raemakers | D66 | 31 March 2021 | 25 October 2021 | |
| Rens Raemakers | D66 | 16 February 2022 | 5 December 2023 | |
| Hawre Rahimi | VVD | 18 January 2022 | 5 December 2023 | |
| Queeny Rajkowski | VVD | 31 March 2021 | 5 December 2023 | |
| Simone Richardson | VVD | 5 September 2022 | 27 October 2022 (Note: Temporarily replaced Ockje Tellegen) | |
| Simone Richardson | VVD | 1 November 2022 | 27 November 2022 (Note: Temporarily replaced Bente Becker) | |
| Simone Richardson | VVD | 5 September 2023 | 5 December 2023 | |
| Raymond de Roon | PVV | 31 March 2021 | 5 December 2023 | |
| Mark Rutte | VVD | 31 March 2021 | 10 January 2022 | |
| Fonda Sahla | D66 | 27 October 2021 | 5 December 2023 | |
| Carola Schouten | CU | 31 March 2021 | 10 January 2022 | |
| Gert-Jan Segers | CU | 31 March 2021 | 24 January 2023 | |
| Chris Simons | VVD | 22 March 2022 | 8 July 2022 | |
| Chris Simons | VVD | 23 August 2022 | 5 December 2023 | |
| Sylvana Simons | BIJ1 | 31 March 2021 | 5 December 2023 | |
| Sjoerd Sjoerdsma | D66 | 31 March 2021 | 5 December 2023 | |
| Evert Jan Slootweg | CDA | 10 May 2022 | 23 August 2022 (Note: Temporarily replaced Anne Kuik) | |
| Evert Jan Slootweg | CDA | 17 January 2023 | 5 December 2023 | |
| Bart Smals | VVD | 7 September 2021 | 5 December 2023 | |
| Sidney Smeets | D66 | 31 March 2021 | 15 April 2021 | |
| Hans Smolders | FVD | 31 March 2021 | 5 December 2023 | |
| Hans Smolders | Groep-Van Haga | 31 March 2021 | 5 December 2023 | |
| Joost Sneller | D66 | 31 March 2021 | 5 December 2023 | |
| Bart Snels | GL | 31 March 2021 | 26 October 2021 (Note: Left after disagreeing with his party over its cooperation with the Labour Party) | |
| Kees van der Staaij | SGP | 31 March 2021 | 5 December 2023 | |
| Chris Stoffer | SGP | 31 March 2021 | 5 December 2023 | |
| Pim van Strien | VVD | 31 March 2021 | 5 December 2023 | |
| Mark Strolenberg | VVD | 7 September 2021 | 5 December 2023 | |
| Ockje Tellegen | VVD | 31 March 2021 | 17 March 2022 (Note: Left because of a burnout) | |
| Nicole Temmink | SP | 5 July 2023 | 5 December 2023 | |
| Hans Teunissen | D66 | 6 July 2023 | 5 December 2023 | |
| Christine Teunissen | PvdD | 31 March 2021 | 5 December 2023 | |
| Joris Thijssen | PvdA | 31 March 2021 | 5 December 2023 | |
| Joris Thijssen | GL-PvdA | 31 March 2021 | 5 December 2023 | |
| Judith Tielen | VVD | 31 March 2021 | 5 December 2023 | |
| Peter Valstar | VVD | 31 March 2021 | 5 December 2023 | |
| Eline Vedder | CDA | 10 May 2023 | 5 December 2023 | |
| Ruud Verkuijlen | VVD | 7 September 2021 | 11 January 2022 (Note: Temporarily replaced Bas van 't Wout) | |
| Ruud Verkuijlen | VVD | 17 January 2022 | 5 December 2023 | |
| Leonie Vestering | PvdD | 31 March 2021 | 8 May 2023 | |
| Leonie Vestering | PvdD | 11 August 2023 | 5 December 2023 | |
| Hans Vijlbrief | D66 | 31 March 2021 | 10 January 2022 | |
| Aukje de Vries | VVD | 31 March 2021 | 10 January 2022 | |
| Sjoerd Warmerdam | D66 | 18 January 2022 | 15 February 2022 (Note: Temporarily replaced Rens Raemakers) | |
| Sjoerd Warmerdam | D66 | 6 June 2023 | 5 December 2023 | |
| Frank Wassenberg | PvdD | 31 March 2021 | 5 December 2023 | |
| Danai van Weerdenburg | PVV | 31 March 2021 | 5 December 2023 | |
| Hanneke van der Werf | D66 | 31 March 2021 | 1 October 2023 | |
| Lucille Werner | CDA | 31 March 2021 | 5 December 2023 | |
| Lisa Westerveld | GL | 31 March 2021 | 5 December 2023 | |
| Lisa Westerveld | GL-PvdA | 31 March 2021 | 5 December 2023 | |
| Steven van Weyenberg | D66 | 31 March 2021 | 2 September 2021 (Note: Left after joining the demissionary cabinet) | |
| Steven van Weyenberg | D66 | 18 January 2022 | 5 December 2023 | |
| Dennis Wiersma | VVD | 31 March 2021 | 2 September 2021 | |
| Jeroen van Wijngaarden | VVD | 31 March 2021 | 5 December 2023 | |
| Geert Wilders | PVV | 31 March 2021 | 5 December 2023 | |
| Hatte van der Woude | VVD | 31 March 2021 | 5 December 2023 | |
| Bas van 't Wout | VVD | 31 March 2021 | 1 June 2021 | |
| Jorien Wuite | D66 | 31 March 2021 | 5 December 2023 | |
| Zohair El Yassini | VVD | 31 March 2021 | 5 December 2023 | |
| Dilan Yeşilgöz-Zegerius | VVD | 31 March 2021 | 2 September 2021 | |
