= Vestering =

Vestering is a surname. Notable people with the surname include:

- Jordan Vestering (born 2000), Singaporean footballer
- Leonie Vestering (born 1984), Dutch politician
