= Stieneke van der Graaf =

Dutch politician (born 1984)

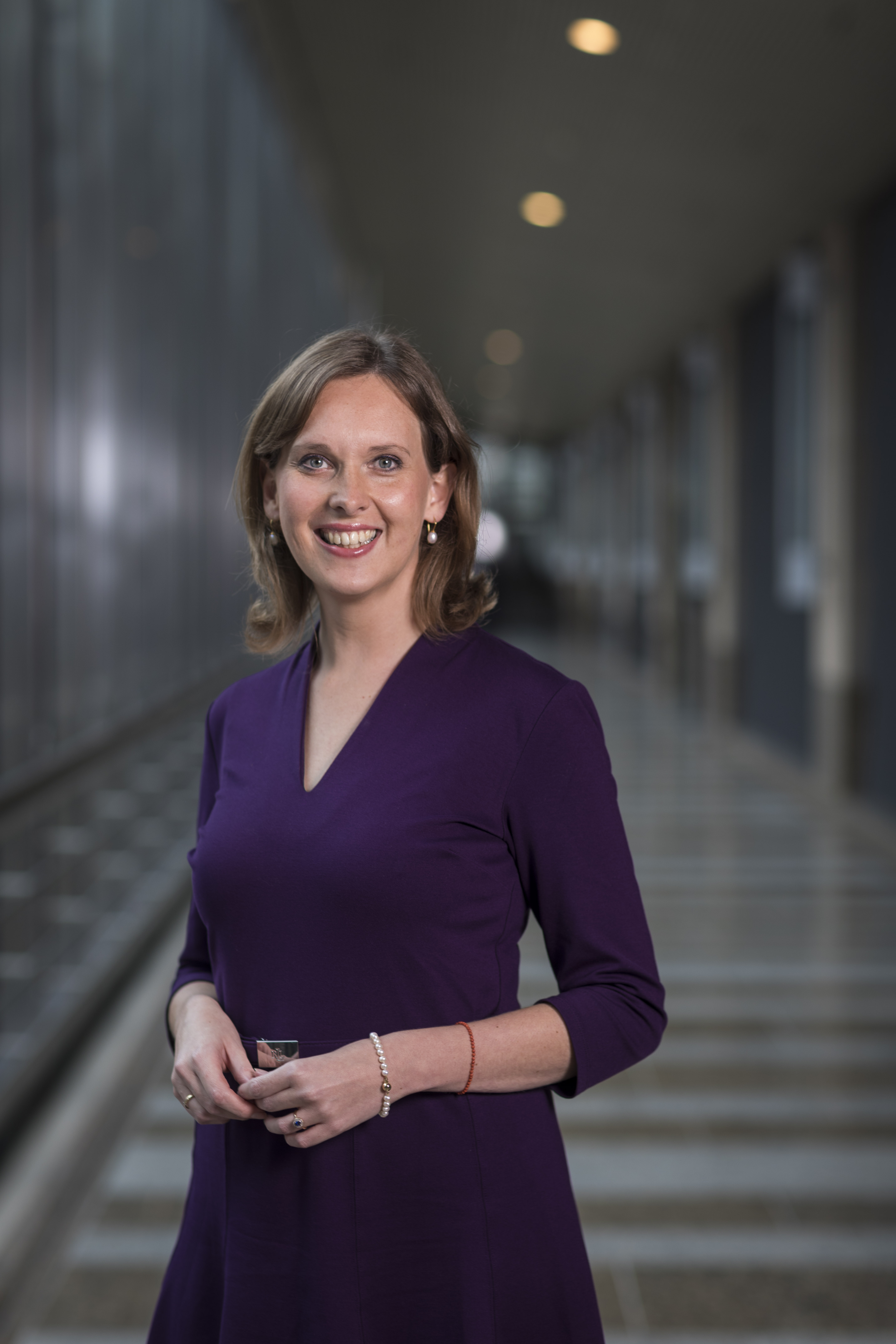
- Portrait, 2017

Mayor of Weststellingwerf
- Acting
- Assumed office 7 May 2025
- Preceded by: André van de Nadort

Member of the House of Representatives
- In office 18 January 2022 – 5 December 2023
- Preceded by: Carola Schouten
- In office 16 July 2019 – 30 March 2021
- Preceded by: Nico Drost
- In office 31 October 2017 – 26 March 2019
- Preceded by: Carola Schouten
- Succeeded by: Nico Drost

Member of the Provincial Council of Groningen
- In office 15 March 2007 – 31 October 2017

Personal details
- Born: Stieneke Jannieta Femmelien van der Graaf; 7 October 1984 (age 41) Zwartsluis, Netherlands
- Party: Christian Union
- Education: University of Groningen
- Occupation: Politician · jurist
- Website: (in Dutch) Christian Union website

Stieneke Jannieta Femmelien van der Graaf (born 7 October 1984) is a Dutch politician and jurist who served thrice as a member of the House of Representatives between 2017 and 2023 for the Christian Union (CU). In 2025 she was appointed Acting Mayor of Weststellingwerf.

She held a seat in the House from 2017 to 2021, with a brief interruption in 2019, when she was replaced by Nico Drost during her maternity leave. She returned in 2022 to take Carola Schouten's seat again, following Schouten's re-appointment to the government. Van der Graaf started her political career in 2007 as party leader in the Provincial Council of Groningen, holding her seat until 2017.

== Decorations ==
Honours
| Ribbon bar | Honour | Country | Date | Ref. |
|---|---|---|---|---|
| | Knight of the Order of Orange-Nassau | Netherlands | 30 March 2021 | |

== Electoral history ==
Electoral history of Stieneke van der Graaf
| Year | Body | Party | Pos. | Votes | Result | | Ref. |
| Year | Body | Party | Pos. | Votes | Party seats | Individual | Ref. |
|---|---|---|---|---|---|---|---|
| 2010 | House of Representatives | Christian Union | 22 | 772 | 5 | Lost | |
| 2012 | House of Representatives | Christian Union | 22 | 875 | 5 | Lost | |
| 2017 | House of Representatives | Christian Union | 6 | 11,526 | 5 | Lost (Note: Van der Graaf was appointed to the body later during the term due to a vacancy.) | |
| 2021 | House of Representatives | Christian Union | 6 | 11,497 | 5 | Lost | |
| 2023 | House of Representatives | Christian Union | 9 | 10,498 | 3 | Lost | |
| 2024 | European Parliament | Christian Union | 18 (Note: Van der Graaf participated as a lijstduwer.) | 3,537 | 0 | Lost | |
