= Dutch Reformed Church (Zwartsluis) =

Church in Zwartsluis, Netherlands

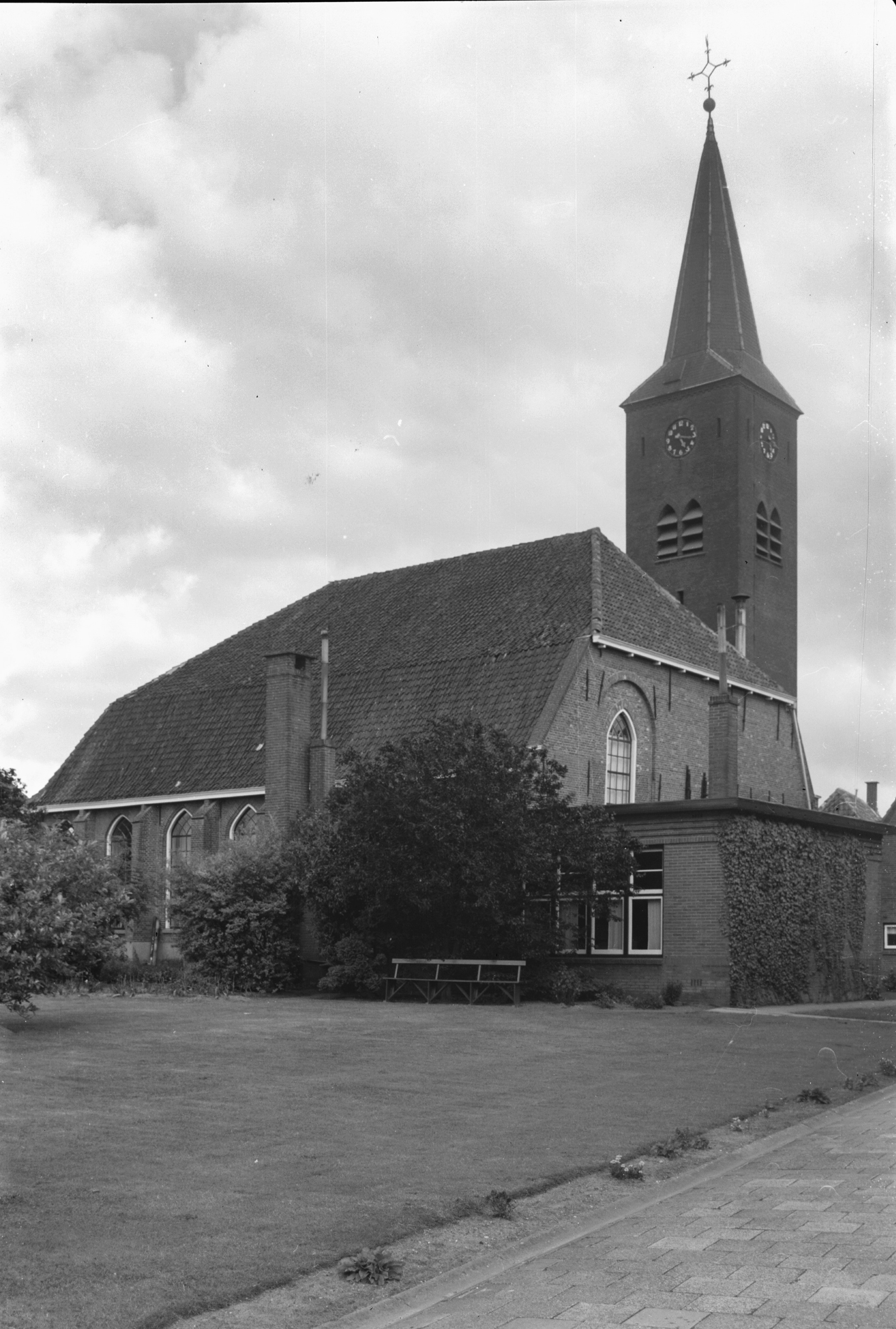
- View of the Hervormde Kerk Zwartsluis
- Interactive map of the Dutch Reformed Church (Zwartsluis) area

General information
- Location: Zwartsluis, Netherlands, Kerkstraat 31, 8064 DM
- Coordinates: 52°38′31″N 6°4′13″E
- Opened: 1604

Renovating team
- Architect: Hendrik Schraa - Steeple (1932)

Website
- http://www.hervormdzwartsluis.nl/

The Dutch Reformed Church of Zwartsluis (in Dutch: Hervormde Kerk Zwartsluis) is a historic Dutch Reformed church building located on the Kerkstraat in Zwartsluis, Netherlands.

== History ==
The Dutch Reformed Church of Zwartsluis was constructed in 1604, after the previous medieval church was torn down in 1581. Some of the original structural material was used to fortify the new church.

The building was first renovated in 1649 with a second pillar on the north side, then again in 1743 by expanding two pillars eastwards.

Hervormde Kerk of Zwartsluis was renovated in 1865, whereby the columns between the pillars were split away and the two barrel-formed vaults were supplanted by one enormous put vault with plaster improvements.

== Steeple ==
The original steeple was demolished in 1930 due to deterioration. The steeple was rebuilt by Hendrik Schraa on the southwest side of the church building in 1932.

== Organ ==
The organ in the Hervormde Kerk of Zwartsluis is a designated Rijksmonument.

== Clocks ==
The congregation steeple contains two clocks, one huge and one little. The smaller clock was built by Henrick Wegewart in 1606 and the larger clock was built by Adriaen Steijlaert in 1566. The larger clock was one of the historic thirteen clocks that Steijlaert originally made for the Oude Kerk in Amsterdam. The larger clock is decorated with a ship, the Amsterdam coat of arms, as well as depictions of Saint Peter, Mary, and Jesus.

During World War II, both clocks were taken by German occupiers in 1943. The smaller clock was returned intact, but the larger clock was so extensively damaged that Jacobus van Bergen had to reconstruct it at Midwolda in 1946.

== Pulpit ==
Dutch woodcarver Hermannus van Arnhem is believed to have constructed the pulpit in 1683. It is extensively decorated with woodcarving detail.

== Current usage ==
As of 2007, the Dutch Reformed congregation has been reestablished at the Hervormde Kerk of Zwartsluis.

== Gallery ==
Dutch Reformed Church (Zwartsluis)
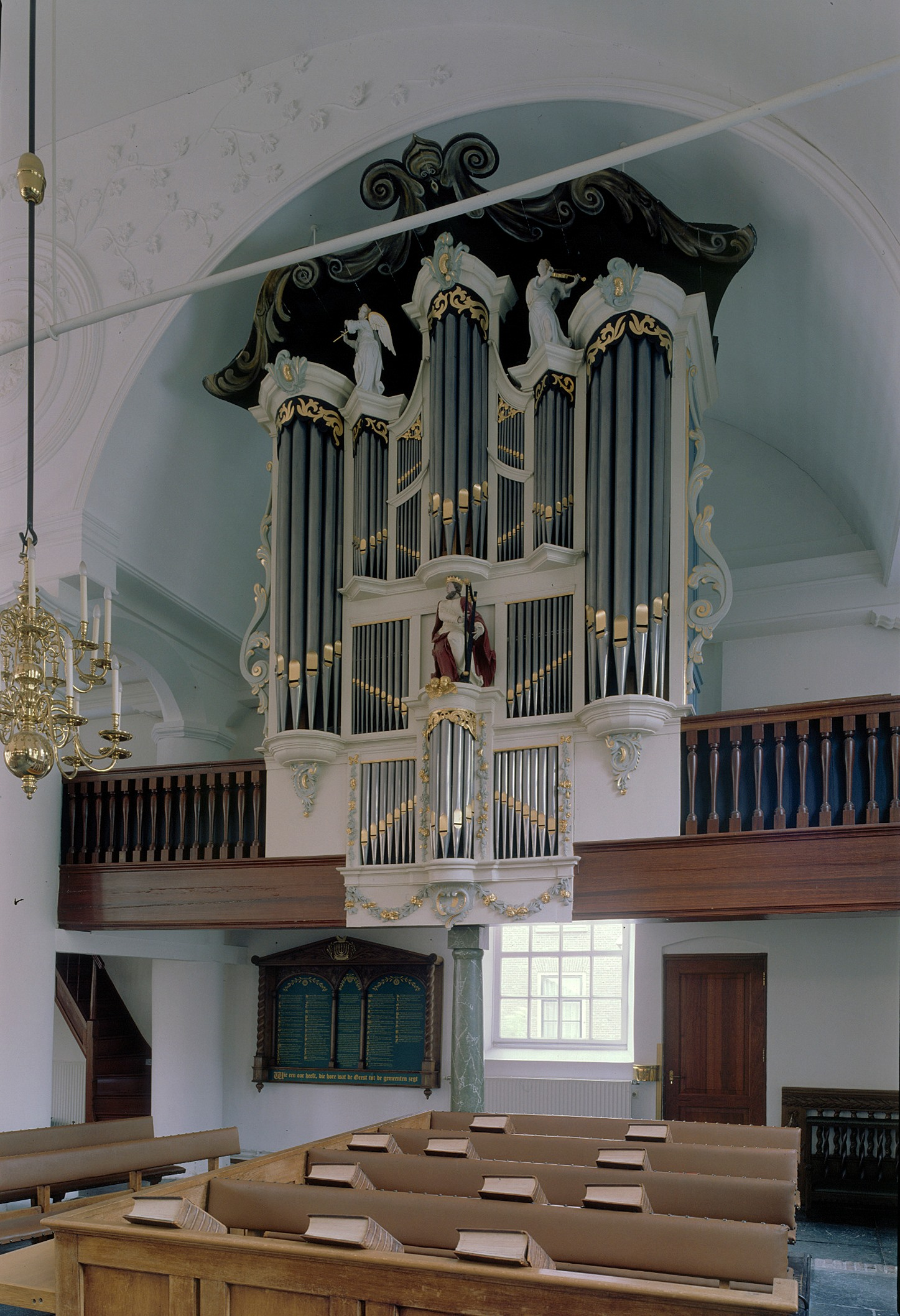
The organ of the church

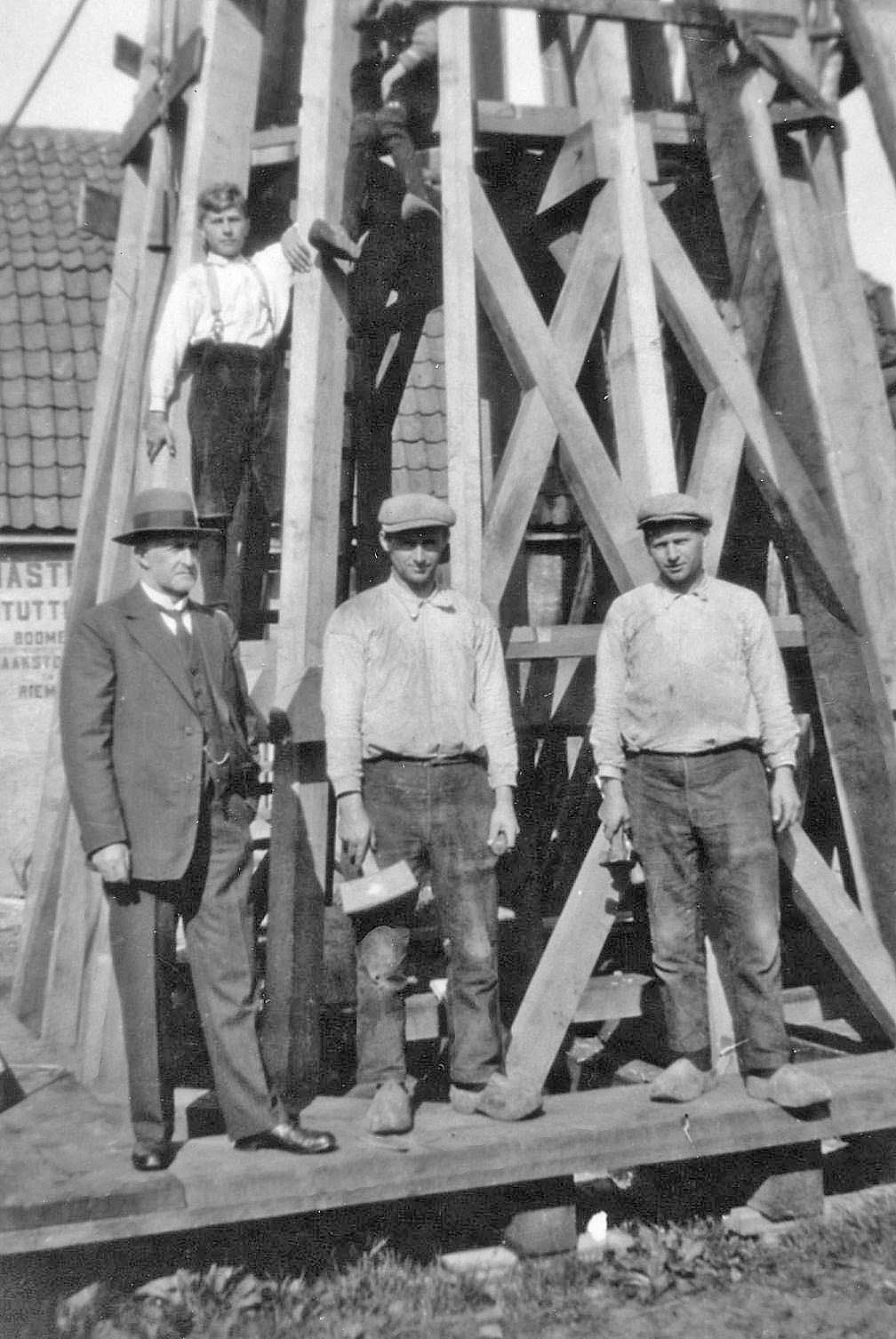
Hendrik Schraa (far left) during steeple construction in 1932

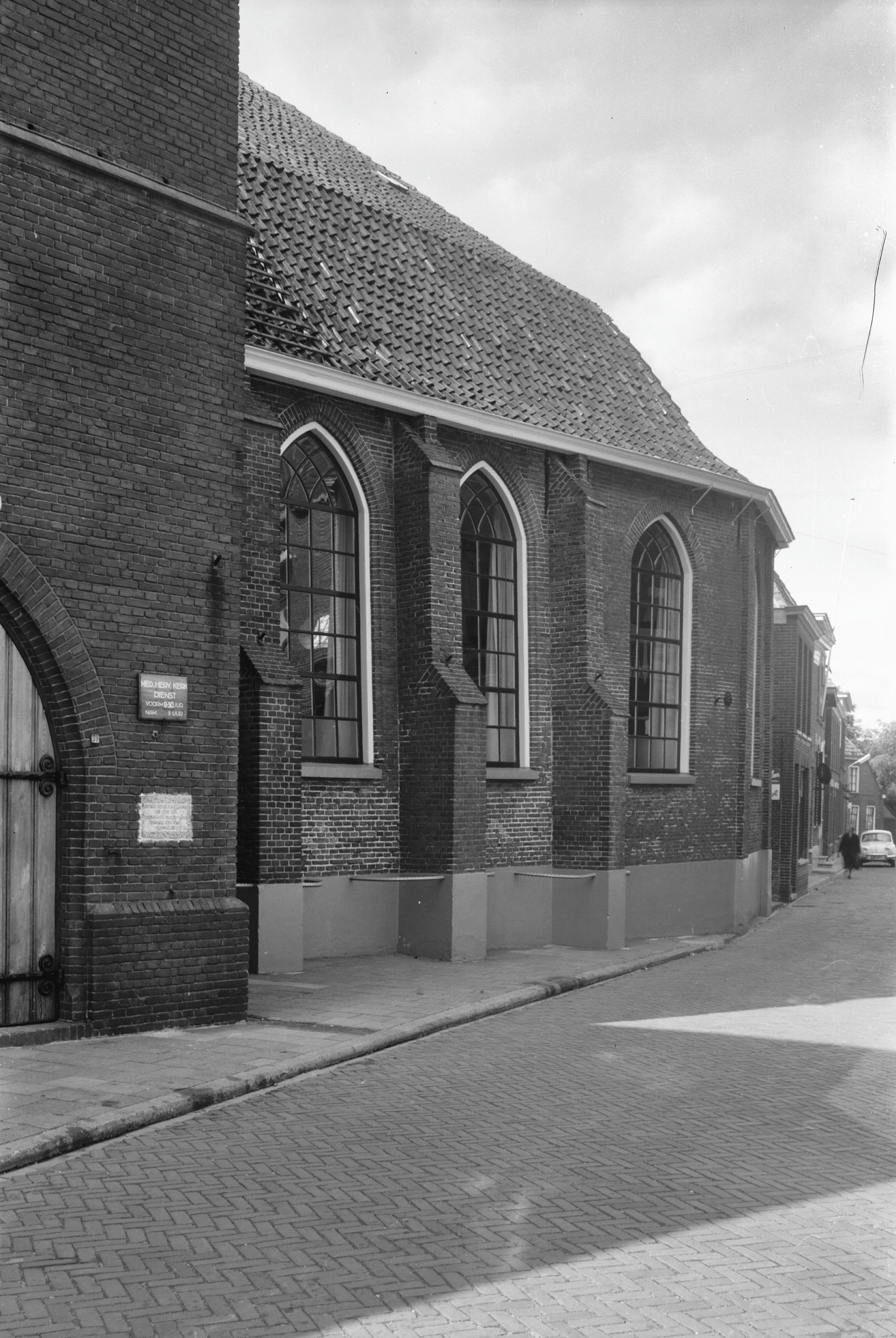
Facing east

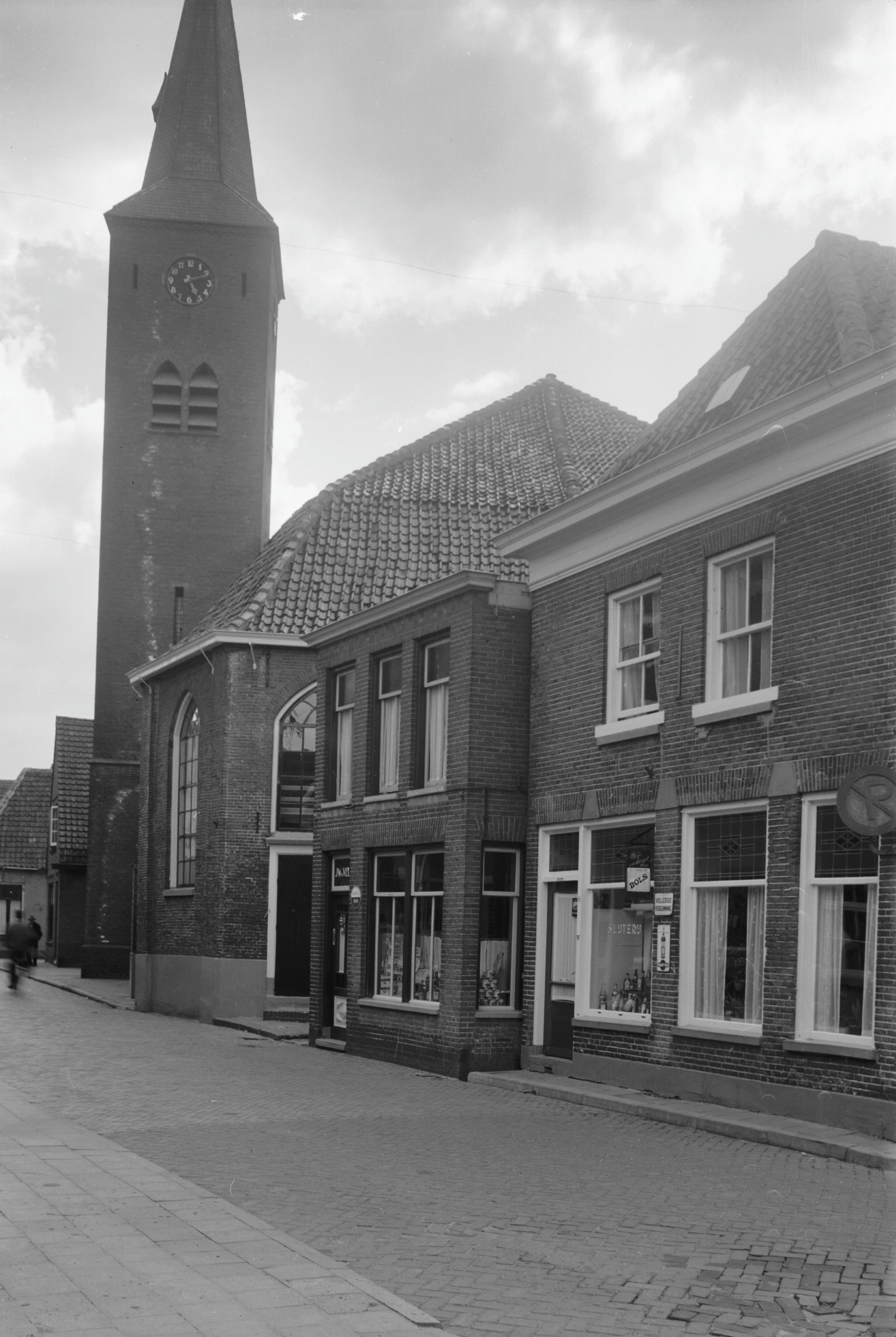
Facing west
