= Songül Mutluer =

Dutch politician (born 1979)

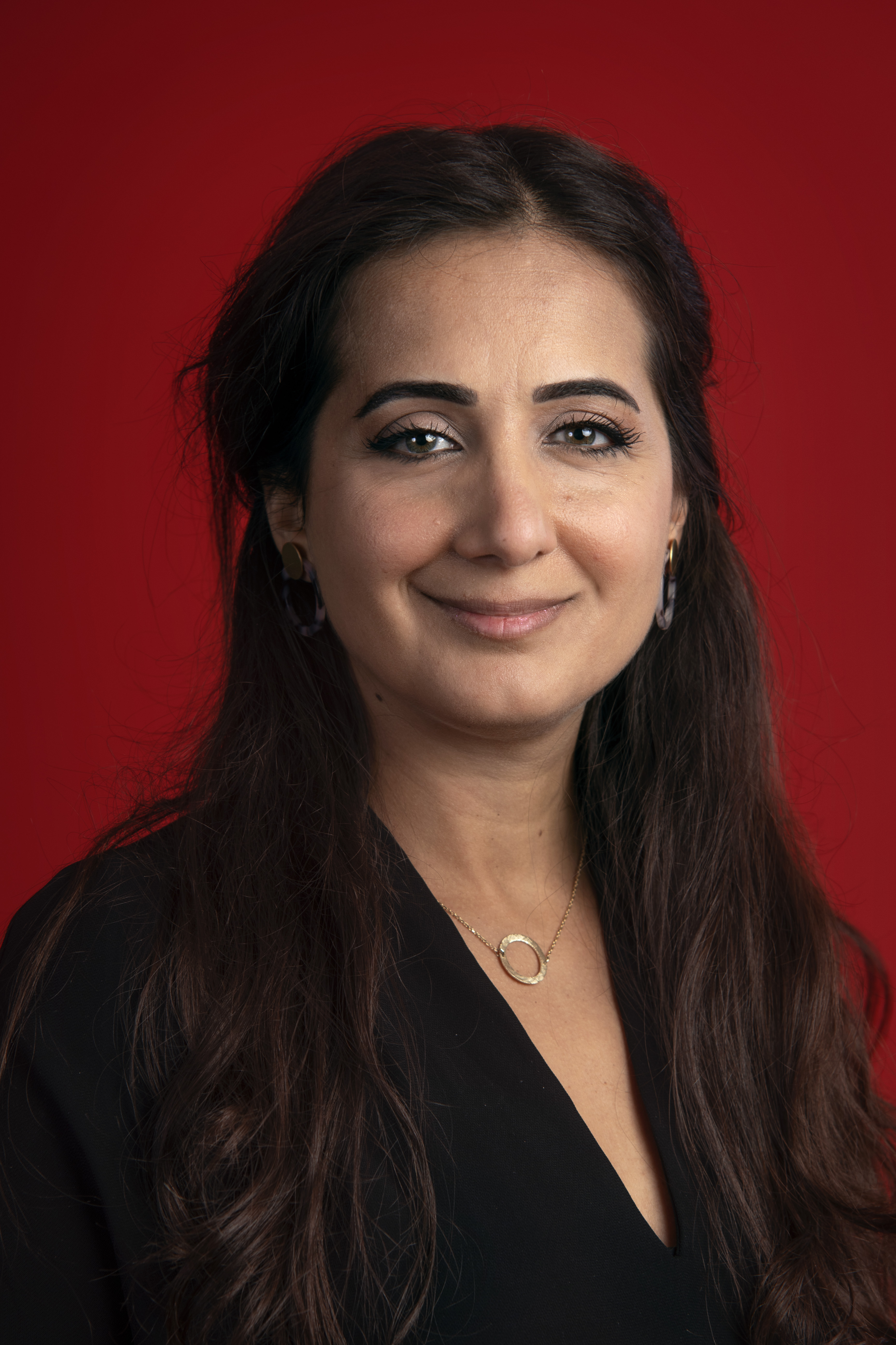

Member of the House of Representatives
- Incumbent
- Assumed office 17 February 2022
- Preceded by: Gijs van Dijk

Alderwoman in Zaanstad
- In office 14 June 2018 – 16 February 2022

Member of the Zaanstad municipal council
- In office 16 March 2006 – 14 June 2018
- Succeeded by: Geert Rijken

Personal details
- Born: Songül Mutluer; 11 December 1979 (age 46) Enschede, Netherlands
- Party: Labour Party (until 2026); PRO (since 2026)
- Education: University of Amsterdam

Songül Mutluer (born 11 December 1979) is a Dutch politician, serving as a member of the House of Representatives since 2022. She is a member of Progressief Nederland (PRO), formerly of the Labour Party (PvdA), and has previously served as a Zaanstad municipal council member and alderwoman for fifteen years. Having studied law, Mutluer has also worked as a legal professional and taught law at the Vrije Universiteit Amsterdam.

== Early life and non-political career ==
She was born in 1979 in the Overijssel city Enschede, where her parents, Turkish migrant workers, were employed in the textile industry. She has a brother and five sisters. At age three, Mutluer moved with her mother to Turkey, where she resided in the cities Mersin and Adana. Mutluer returned to the Netherlands in 1988 with her mother. There, she lived in the Zaandam neighborhood Poelenburg and attended the high school Zaanlands Lyceum at gymnasium level in the years 1992–98.

Mutluer subsequently studied law at the University of Amsterdam, obtaining a Master of Laws degree. During her study, when she was just over twenty years old, she returned to Turkey to intern at an Ankara law firm for four months. After graduating in 2004, Mutluer started teaching law at the Vrije Universiteit Amsterdam and received a grant to research invitations to tender. From 2015 to 2017, she served as a guest lecturer at University College Utrecht. Next to her teaching career, she became a legal professional specialized in invitations to tender and contracts, working for Corvers Procurement Services (2016–17) and for the governmental organization Rijkswaterstaat (2017–18).

== Politics ==
=== Zaanstad ===
Mutluer became a member of the municipal council of Zaanstad after she was elected in the 2006 election as the Labour Party's fifth candidate in the municipality. Mutluer was re-elected in March 2010, being placed second on the party list. She became her party's caucus leader in the municipal council in December 2010. She again appeared second on the Labour Party's list in the 2014 municipal election. Besides, Mutluer became a member of an advisory committee that selected the Labour Party's candidates for the 2017 general election. She stepped down as caucus leader for a half year starting in the spring of 2016 in order to write her dissertation.

Mutluer was re-elected once again in March 2018 as her party's lead candidate. She vacated her seat in the municipal council in June to serve as alderwoman of housing, youth care services, poverty, and elderly policy in the new municipal executive. She also became a board member of the Association of Netherlands Municipalities (VNG) in late 2019. Zaanstad received €20.5 million from the national government during her term to invest in the quick construction of new houses and another €43 million to spend on vulnerable neighborhoods in the eastern part of the city, more than any other municipality. Mutluer told that she wanted to use the latter funds to increase the sustainability of 850 houses, to improve public spaces and amenities, and to combat housing fraud. Halfway through 2020, a number of youth care service centers stopped admitting new children, as the region Zaanstreek-Waterland had run out of its budget for that year. The regional audit office concluded that the costs Zaanstad was making had gotten out of hand in the preceding years and that the municipality did not have reliable data about its system. Mutluer called on the national government to provide more funds to municipalities for youth care services.

=== National ===
She was the Labour Party's tenth candidate in the March 2021 general election and received 4,896 preference votes. Mutluer was not elected, as her party won nine seats in the House of Representatives. She had previously been one of the lijstduwers during the 2012 general election in the Den Helder electoral district (place 77). Mutluer was eventually appointed to the House of Representatives on 17 February 2022 following the resignation of Gijs van Dijk due to inappropriate behavior, and she simultaneously stepped down as alderwoman and board member of the VNG. She served as her party's spokesperson for security, justice, neighborhoods, discrimination, racism, and emancipation. She had been pursuing a second term as alderwoman before her appointment to the House.

A motion by Mutluer was carried stating that insured inhabitants of Limburg and North Brabant with damage from the 2021 European floods should receive compensation from the government. A number of victims had received payments from their insurance company insufficient to repair all the damage and had because of that not qualified for government compensation. In 2023, Mutluer and Anne Kuik (CDA) introduced a bill to prohibit publishing videos of violent crime, following a number of filmed assaults that had gone viral online. The offense would carry a maximum fine of €9,000 or a one-year prison sentence, and the bill contained an exclusion for footage published in the public interest. Mutluer said these videos infringe on the human dignity of crime victims. Following a motion by Mutluer, the fourth Rutte cabinet presented an action plan against femicide in June 2024.

Mutluer was re-elected on the shared GroenLinks–PvdA list in November 2023, and her specialties changed to safety, law, police labor, emancipation, and femicide. In an interview, she challenged the notion that femicide is only an issue in some communities. She called the cabinet's action plan inadequate, and she presented a policy memorandum, proposing €30 million in yearly funding for awareness campaigns and for increased capacity for and cooperation between government agencies. €10 million in yearly funding was eventually added to the 2025 budget because of an amendment by Mutluer. The House adopted a motion by Mutluer to establish a reintegration and support program for money mules, to prevent them from becoming professional criminals.

== Personal life ==
Mutluer is a resident of the North Holland city of Zaandam.

== Electoral history ==
Electoral history of Songül Mutluer
Year	Body	Party	Pos.	Votes	Result		Ref.
Year	Body	Party	Pos.	Votes	Party seats	Individual	Ref.
2021	House of Representatives	Labour Party	10	4,896	9	Lost (Note: Mutluer was appointed to the body later during the term due to a vacancy.)	
2023	House of Representatives	GroenLinks–PvdA	10	8,711	25	Won	
2025	House of Representatives	GroenLinks–PvdA	17	10,229	20	Lost (Note: Mutluer did receive a seat in the body due to Frans Timmermans declining his.)	
