= Joris Thijssen =

Dutch Greenpeace director and politician

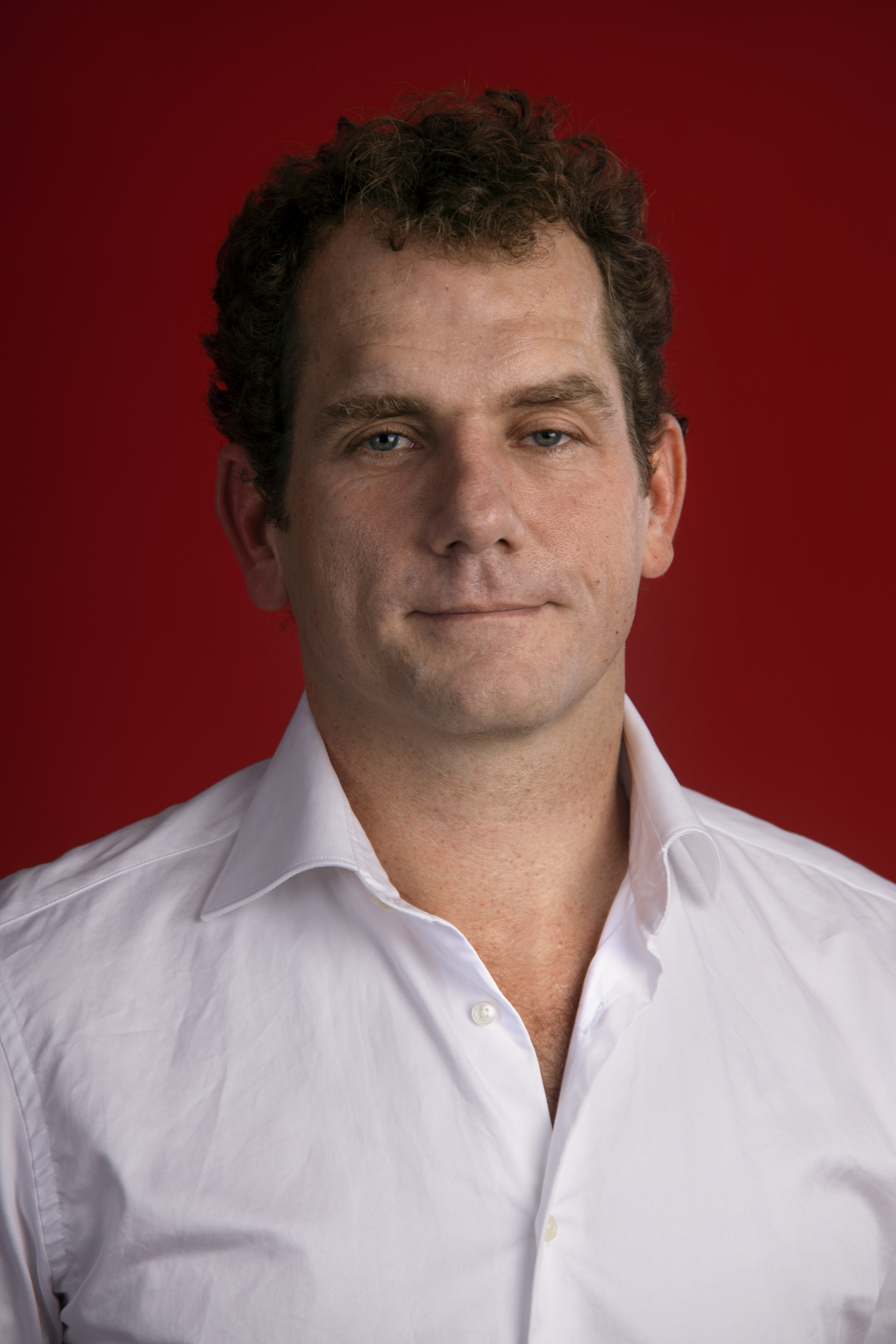

Member of the House of Representatives
- In office 31 March 2021 – 11 November 2025

Personal details
- Born: J. Thijssen; 19 April 1974 (age 52) Arnhem, Netherlands
- Party: Labour Party
- Children: 2
- Education: Delft University of Technology; Erasmus University Rotterdam

Joris Thijssen (born 19 April 1974) is a Dutch environmental activist and politician. After studying aerospace engineering, he started working for the environmental organization Greenpeace. He participated in numerous protest actions, leading to a number of arrests and a criminal record. In 2016, he became co-director of Greenpeace Netherlands. He left his job to participate in the 2021 general election, in which he was elected to the House of Representatives. There, he represents the Labour Party until November 2025.

== Early life and education ==
He was born in 1974 in the Gelderland city of Arnhem. His father ran a scooter importing business. Thijssen studied aerospace engineering at Delft University of Technology starting in 1992, graduating cum laude in 2000. He was a member of the student rowing club DSR Proteus-Eretes. He traveled around the world after his second year of study. According to Thijssen, this made him think about how humans are affecting the planet. For his thesis about landing a lunar lander on the south pole, he interned at the European Space Agency (ESA) for two years under the supervision of astronaut Wubbo Ockels. Thijssen's father died when Joris was twenty years old. He later also studied philosophy and anthropology at the University of Amsterdam and Leiden University, and he has received an executive MBA degree from Erasmus University Rotterdam.

He applied for a job as an astronaut at the ESA in 2008, but was not chosen.

== Greenpeace ==
Thijssen joined the environmental organization Greenpeace as a volunteer in the second half of the 1990s. In 1997, he went to Normandy with future politician Diederik Samson to measure the level of radioactivity at a discharge pipe from a boat using kites. After he completed his studies, he became a paid employee at the organization. He campaigned against nuclear energy and researched the melting of glaciers.

In July 2002, Thijssen managed to enter the grounds of palace Huis ten Bosch, where the first Balkenende cabinet was presented. In protest, he held up a banner saying "the Minister of Environment reports" before being removed from the property by guards ten minutes later. The Royal Marechaussee had let Thijssen, who was dressed up and arrived in the back seat of a rental car, in after his chauffeur had said that he was the new environmental minister. Two months later, on the day after Prinsjesdag, Thijssen illegally entered the plenary hall of the House of Representatives during budget debates. He was escorted out and arrested before he could chain himself and speak. He was released form his cell later that day. He was not prosecuted for those actions after reaching a settlement of €250.

Thijssen served as climate and energy campaign leader at Greenpeace Netherlands until he moved to China in 2007 to work as an advisor at the organization's Beijing office for a year. Subsequently, he held a position at Greenpeace International for two years, coordinating forty regional offices and assisting their campaigns. In 2009–10, Thijssen spent twenty days in the Danish Vestre Prison in remand after he and three other activists had been arrested for trespassing on government property and forgery during the Copenhagen Summit. He had assisted two activists who had entered a gala dinner for foreign dignitaries at Christiansborg Palace and had shown banners in protest. He later received a two-week suspended sentence but was also given €2,400 in damages for his earlier detention.

After this, Thijssen returned to Greenpeace Netherlands to serve as campaign director and later as program director. He again tried to make an appearance as environmental minister during the presentation of the first Rutte cabinet in 2010 at Huis ten Bosch. This time, he failed to set foot on the premises, and he was detained for a number of hours after claiming to be the Minister of Defence and showing his banner. Thijssen also served as Greenpeace's negotiator for the Social and Economic Council's 2013 Energieakkoord (Energy accord), in which 47 Dutch organizations including the government agreed to make the energy supply more sustainable.

=== Co-director (2016–2020) ===
Thijssen became executive director of Greenpeace Netherlands on 1 September 2016 together with Anna Schoemakers. They succeeded Sylvia Borren. Thijssen's main focus was Dutch politics and corporations, while Schoemakers was more involved with foreign issues. A week after being promoted, Thijssen, Schoemakers, and another activist lay in hammocks that were attached to a cable between two wind turbines at the Eemshaven in order to prevent a ship carrying coal from reaching a coal power plant. The following month, Thijssen participated in a Dutch climate conference that was held after the signing of the Paris Agreement to discuss its implementation. There, he was noted for shaking the hand of the CEO of Royal Dutch Shell Netherlands, Marjan van Loon.

Under Thijssen's and Schoemakers's leadership, Greenpeace Netherlands raised its budget to recruit donors, as that number had fallen by over a fifth in the five-year period preceding 2018. Greenpeace was also one of the participants in the negotiations for the Dutch climate accord in 2018. Weeks before the accord's planned completion, Greenpeace and three other environmental organizations threatened to not sign it. In December – on the day before it was offered to the cabinet – the organizations announced definitively that they would not support the draft agreement. Thijssen said in an interview that he believed that the measures would not be sufficient to halt "dangerous climate change". Furthermore, he opposed the accord's carbon capture and storage, and he believed that people were paying too much relative to corporations to mitigate climate change.

He resigned from his position at Greenpeace as soon as it was announced in November 2020 that he would participate in the 2021 general election. The reason for his departure was to maintain the political neutrality of Greenpeace.

== Politics ==
Thijssen ran for member of parliament in the 2021 general election, being placed sixth on the Labour Party's party list. He was elected with 2,666 preference votes and was sworn into the House on 31 March. Thijssen became his party's spokesperson for climate, energy, agriculture, nature, foreign trade, and development cooperation. Thijssen opposed investing in nuclear energy, calling it a distraction from the actual mitigation of climate change due to high costs and the resulting radioactive waste. Together with member of parliament Suzanne Kröger (GroenLinks), he wrote a plan in 2022 to tackle climate change. It included more ambitious goals than those proposed by the cabinet, and it focused on allowing people with lower incomes to become more sustainable. To aid the reduction of reactive nitrogen emissions in the nitrogen crisis in the Netherlands, the government maintained a policy of buying out farmers. Thijssen subsequently proposed that debts of those discontinuing farmers would be partly written off by Rabobank, the largest agricultural financier. This would prevent a major portion of the buyout money ending up at the bank. A motion by Thijssen to investigate the possibility of such a bail-in was supported by a majority of the House.

Thijssen was re-elected in November 2023 on the shared GroenLinks–PvdA list, and his portfolio changed to economic affairs. His left the House on 11 November 2025, following a general election.

=== House committee assignments ===
==== 2021–2023 term ====
- Building advice committee
- Committee for Agriculture, Nature and Food Quality
- Committee for Defence
- Committee for Economic Affairs and Climate Policy
- Committee for Foreign Trade and Development Cooperation
- Committee for Infrastructure and Water Management

==== 2023–2025 term ====
- Committee for Climate Policy and Green Growth (chair)
- Building advice committee
- Committee for Economic Affairs
- Committee for Digital Affairs
- Committee for Agriculture, Fisheries, Food Security and Nature
- Committee for Housing and Spatial Planning

== Personal life ==
He lives in the North Holland village Muiderberg with his girlfriend and two sons, and he is a vegetarian.

== Electoral history ==
Electoral history of Joris Thijssen
| Year | Body | Party | Pos. | Votes | Result | | Ref. |
| Year | Body | Party | Pos. | Votes | Party seats | Individual | Ref. |
|---|---|---|---|---|---|---|---|
| 2021 | House of Representatives | Labour Party | 6 | 2,666 | 9 | Won | |
| 2023 | House of Representatives | GroenLinks–PvdA | 16 | 1,871 | 25 | Won | |
