= Zwartsluis =

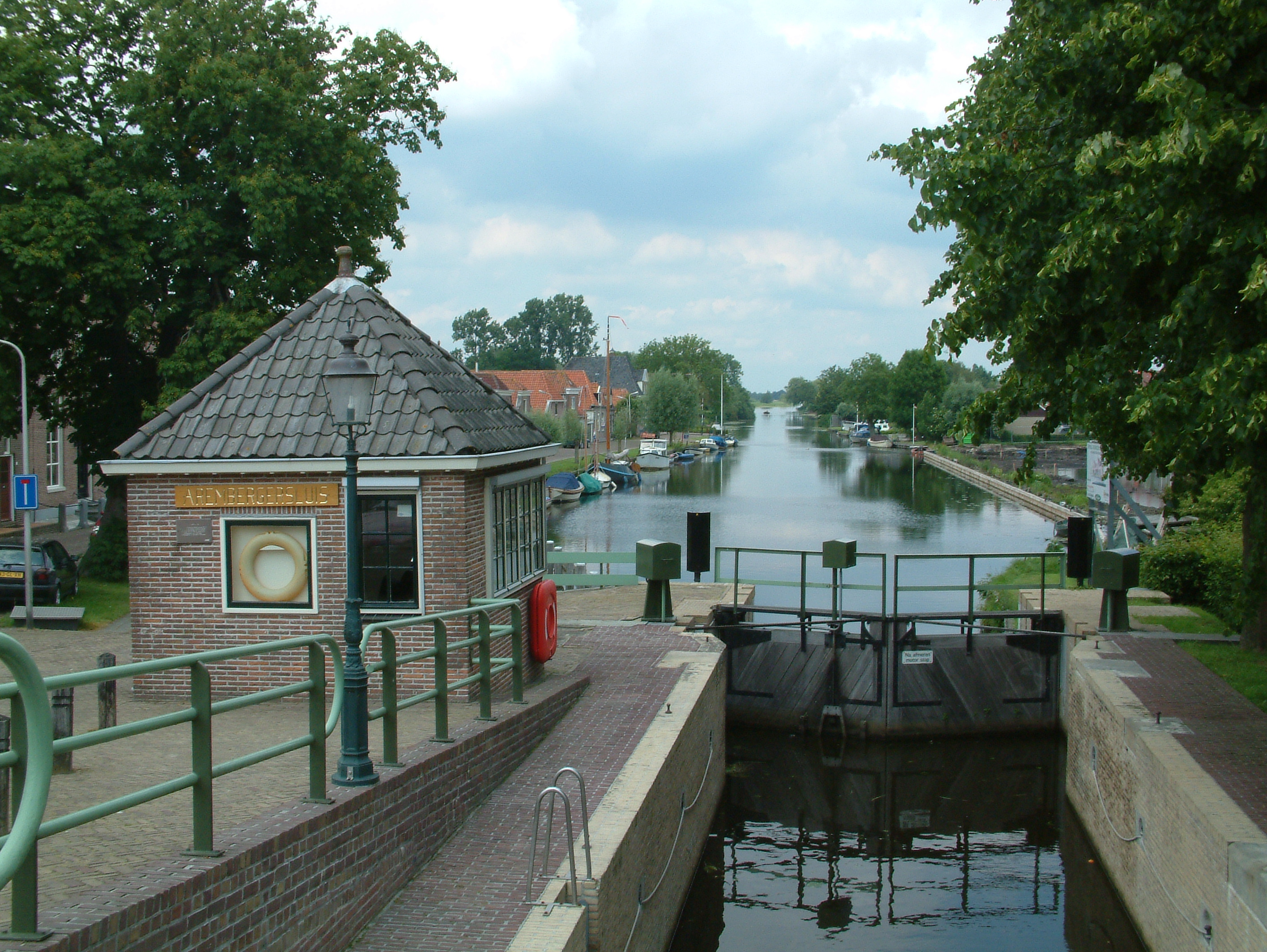
- The Arembergersluis of Zwartsluis

- Flag Coat of arms

- Location within Overijssel Location within Netherlands
- Coordinates: 52°38′31″N 6°4′13″E
- Country: Netherlands
- Province: Overijssel
- Municipality: Zwartewaterland

Area
  - Total: 18.34 km^{2} (7.08 sq mi)
- Elevation: 3 m (9.8 ft)

Population (2026)
  - Total: 5,004
  - Density: 272.8/km^{2} (706.7/sq mi)
- Time zone: UTC+1 (CET)
  - Summer (DST): UTC+2 (CEST)
- Postal code: 8064
- Dialing code: 038

Zwartsluis is a small city in the Dutch province of Overijssel. It is located in the municipality of Zwartewaterland, at the mouth of the Zwarte Water river and the Meppelerdiep canal.

== History ==
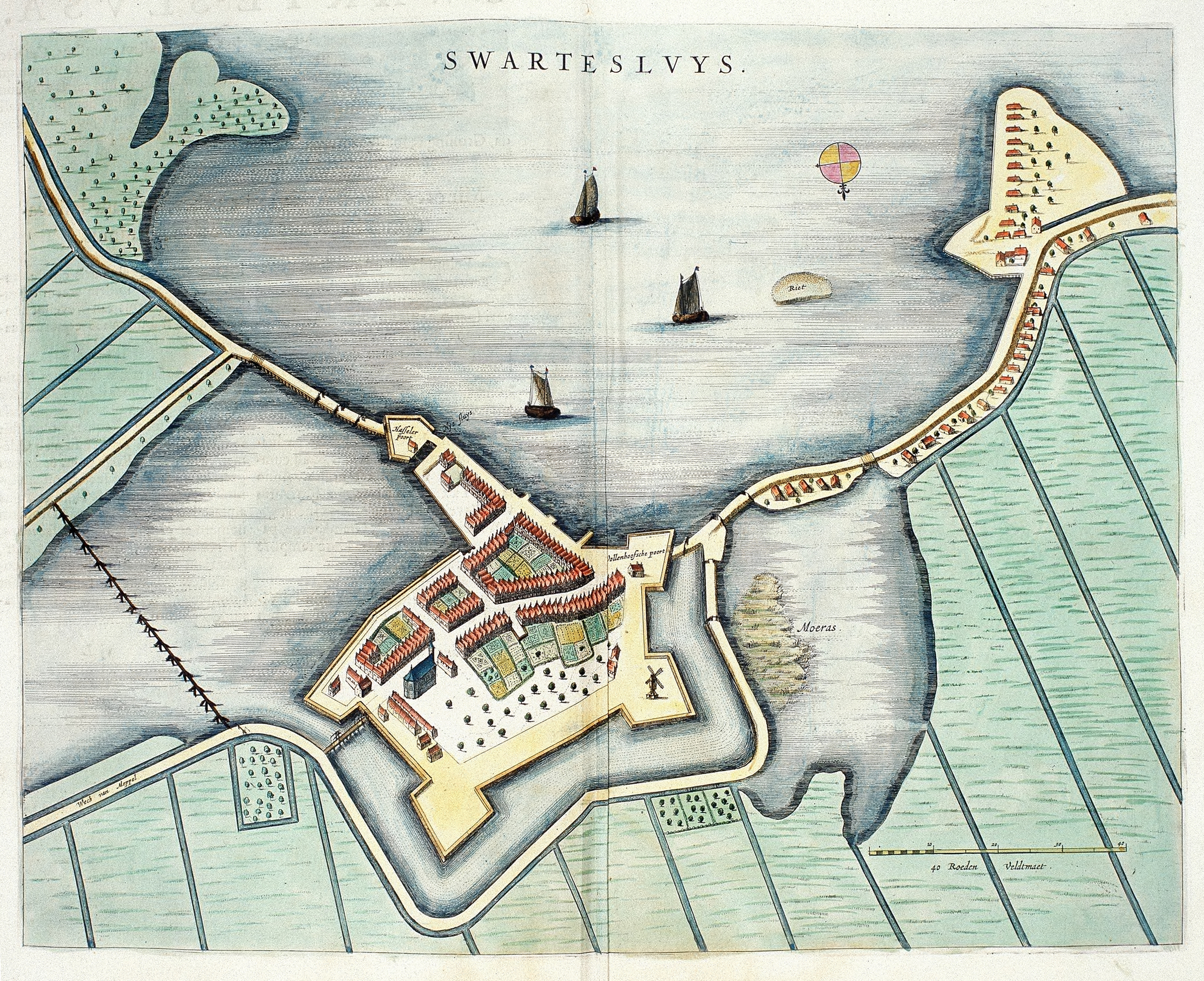
1649 map of Zwartsluis in Willem and Joan Blaeu's "Toonneel der Steden"

Zwartsluis's history started in the Eighty Years' War (1568–1648): it developed around the Swartersluys fortress, which controlled traffic on the Zwartewater inlet leading to Hasselt and Zwolle. Zwartsluis attracted some trade and a fishing fleet in later centuries. Zwartsluis also served as a consolidation point for the peat-fuel trade, but was surpassed in importance by its neighbours, especially downstream Genemuiden.

The Dutch Reformed Church of Zwartsluis is a historic Dutch Reformed church building located on the Kerkstraat and the organ in the church is a designated Rijksmonument.

== Recreation ==
The town is home to many recreational boats, as well as a heritage fleet of fishing and cargo vessels. The Arembergergracht canal links the town with the Beulaker and Belter lakes and a multitude of smaller bodies of water just north, created by peat digging.

== Government ==
Zwartsluis was a separate municipality until 2001, when it became a part of Zwartewaterland.

== Notable people ==
- Stieneke van der Graaf (born 1984), politician (MP)
