= Nicole Temmink =

Dutch politician (born 1987)

Member of the Dutch House of Representatives
- In office 5 July 2023 – 5 December 2023

Personal details
- Born: 22 March 1987 (age 39) Slagharen, Netherlands
- Party: Socialist

Nicole Temmink (born 22 March 1987) Dutch politician from the Socialist Party who briefly served as a member of the House of Representatives in 2023.

== Electoral history ==
Electoral history of Nicole Temmink.
Year	Body	Party	Pos.	Votes	Result		Ref.
Year	Body	Party	Pos.	Votes	Party seats	Individual	Ref.
2017	House of Representatives	Socialist Party	30	766	14	Lost	
2021	House of Representatives	Socialist Party	13	2,370	9	Lost (Note: Temmink was appointed to the body later during the term due to a vacancy.)	
2023	House of Representatives	Socialist Party	7	2,865	5	Lost	

== See also ==
- List of members of the House of Representatives of the Netherlands, 2021–2023
