= Marieke Koekkoek =

Member of the Dutch House of Representatives

Member of the House of Representatives
- In office 5 July 2023 – 11 November 2025
- Preceded by: Ernst Boutkan
- In office 31 March 2021 – 14 March 2023
- Succeeded by: Ernst Boutkan

Personal details
- Born: 26 February 1989 (age 37) Amsterdam, Netherlands
- Party: Volt Netherlands
- Children: 3
- Education: Utrecht University; University of Amsterdam; University of Barcelona; KU Leuven
- Occupation: Lawyer

Marieke Koekkoek (born 26 February 1989) is a Dutch lawyer and politician for the pro-European party Volt Netherlands. She was elected to the House of Representatives in the 2021 general election owing to the number of preference votes she received. She left the House in November 2025. Prior to being a member of parliament, she studied law and worked as a legal intern.

== Early life and career ==
Koekkoek was born in the Dutch capital of Amsterdam and grew up in its neighbourhood Zuidoost. Her parents were elementary school teachers. After having spent a gap year in Australia and Europe, she started studying Dutch law at Utrecht University in 2008. She was a member of its study association Urios and chaired Urios's Model United Nations Society. After her graduation in 2011, Koekkoek studied a year at the University of Amsterdam and another year at the University of Barcelona, obtaining master's degrees in International Trade and Investment Law and in International Economic Law and Policy, respectively.

In October 2013, Koekkoek joined the KU Leuven's Centre for Global Governance Studies as a PhD student and researcher. She specialized in international commercial law and returned to the Netherlands in 2017, while she kept working at KU Leuven. Koekkoek lived in China for some time in 2019 to teach at the China-EU School of Law. She became a legal intern for Fieldfisher in Amsterdam in September 2019.

== Politics ==
Koekkoek joined the new pro-European party Volt in 2018 after she had been a member of Democrats 66. She was involved in creating the party's European platform and participated in the 2019 European Parliament election in the Netherlands as Volt's 22nd candidate.

She was placed fourth on the party list in the 2021 general election and again helped write the platform. Koekkoek campaigned on LGBT rights and on immigration. She wanted the procedure for asylum seekers to become quicker, and she wanted them to have the right to work and to learn the Dutch language while awaiting the results of their asylum application. Even though Volt won three seats in the election, Koekkoek was elected to the House of Representatives because of her 37,093 preference votes at the expense of Volt's third candidate, Ernst Boutkan. Koekkoek was one of three candidates in the 2021 election who were elected due to their preference votes. In late 2022, the House of Representatives passed a motion by Koekkoek and Hülya Kat (D66) to have the government provide free period products to low-income households. Koekkoek called it a start and advocated making them free for everyone. She vacated her seat between 15 March and 5 July 2023 to go on a parental leave and was temporarily replaced by Ernst Boutkan.

In the House, she was on the following committees:

- Committee for Agriculture, Nature and Food Quality
- Committee for Digital Affairs
- Committee for Foreign Trade and Development Cooperation
- Committee for Health, Welfare and Sport
- Committee for Infrastructure and Water Management
- Committee for the Interior
- Committee for Justice and Security
- Committee for Kingdom Relations
- Petitions committee
- Committee for Social Affairs and Employment

Koekkoek headed the committee that wrote Volt's election program for the November 2023 general election. The party received two seats, and Koekkoek was re-elected. She was not re-elected in October 2025, as Volt only elected one member, and her term ended on 11 November. In June 2026, she was elected to the executive board of Volt Europa.

== Personal life ==
Koekkoek lives in the Utrecht neighbourhood of Leidsche Rijn. Her husband is from China, having come to the Netherlands to study and work, and she has three children. Koekkoek can play violin.

== Electoral history ==
Electoral history of Marieke Koekkoek
Year	Body	Party	Pos.	Votes	Result		Ref.
Year	Body	Party	Pos.	Votes	Party seats	Individual	Ref.
2021	House of Representatives	Volt Netherlands	4	37,093	3	Won (Note: Koekkoek received enough preference votes to be elected despite her party's result.)	
2023	House of Representatives	Volt Netherlands	2	38,747	2	Won	
2025	House of Representatives	Volt Netherlands	2	30,132	1	Lost	
