= Ernst Boutkan =

Dutch politician (born 1996)

Member of the House of Representatives
- In office 16 March 2023 – 5 July 2023
- Preceded by: Marieke Koekkoek
- Succeeded by: Marieke Koekkoek

Personal details
- Born: 3 January 1996 (age 30) Haarlem
- Party: Volt Netherlands
- Education: Bachelor's degree in Cultural Anthropology; Master's degree in Public Administration and Economics
- Alma mater: Leiden University

Ernst Boutkan (born 3 January 1996 in Haarlem, North Holland) is a Dutch politician from the Volt Nederland party. He was a member of the House of Representatives for this party from 16 March 2023 to 5 July 2023.

== Biography ==
Boutkan was born in Haarlem in 1996 and grew up in Geertruidenberg in Noord-Brabant. He studied at Leiden University from 2014 to 2021, where he obtained a Bachelor's degree in Cultural Anthropology and a Master's degree in Public Administration and Economics.

In 2018, he became a member of the Volt party. In the 2021 Dutch parliamentary elections, Boutkan was third on Volt's list of candidates. The party won three seats in those elections, but fourth-placed Marieke Koekkoek secured the third seat with preferential votes. After the elections, he worked as a policy officer for the party's lower house faction. In March 2023, Koekkoek went on maternity leave, so Boutkan has been temporarily sitting in the House of Representatives since 16 March. His appointment is valid until 4 July 2023.

== Personal life ==
Boutkan lives in Leiden with his girlfriend.

== Electoral history ==
Electoral history of Ernst Boutkan
Year	Body	Party	Pos.	Votes	Result		Ref.
Year	Body	Party	Pos.	Votes	Party seats	Individual	Ref.
2021	House of Representatives	Volt Netherlands	3	2,783	3	Lost (Note: Boutkan was not elected despite his party's result due to another candidate meeting the threshold for preference votes. However, he was appointed to the body later during the term due to a vacancy.)	
2023	House of Representatives	Volt Netherlands	3	2,263	2	Lost	
