= Eva Akerboom =

Dutch politician (born 1992)

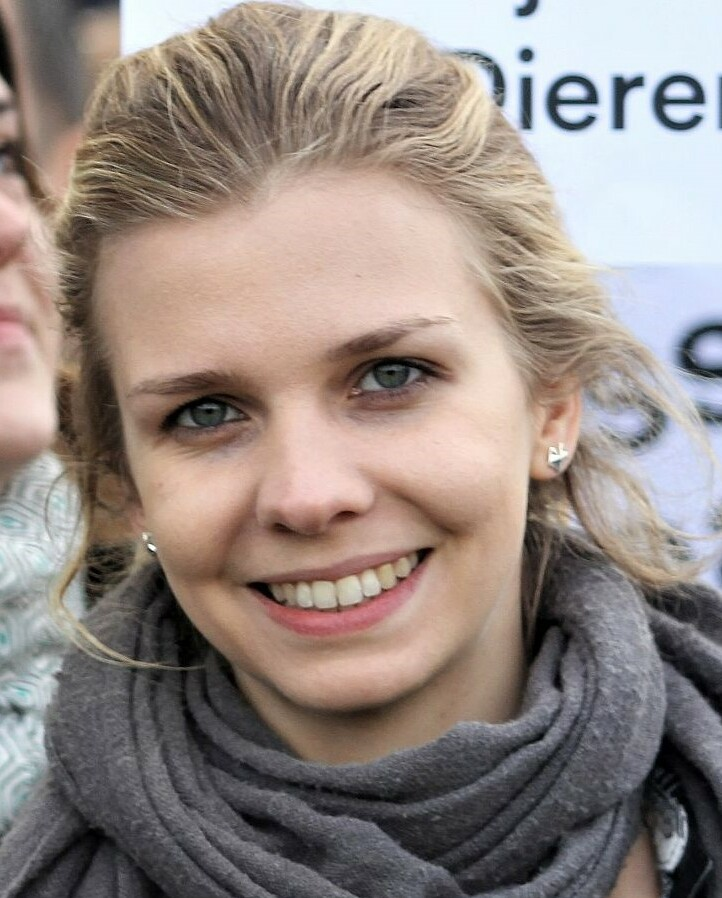

Member of the Dutch House of Representatives
- In office 27 September 2023 – 5 December 2023
- In office 10 May 2023 – 11 August 2023
- In office 13 October 2022 – 1 February 2023
- In office 16 October 2018 – 4 February 2019

Personal details
- Born: Eva Suzanne Akerboom; 12 March 1992 (age 34) Lisse, Netherlands
- Party: PvdD
- Education: Vrije Universiteit Amsterdam (MSc)
- Occupation: Politician

Eva Suzanne Akerboom (born 12 March 1992) is a Dutch politician for the Party for the Animals (PvdD).

== Early life and education ==
Akerboom was born on 12 March 1992 in Lisse. She attended grammar school at Fioretti College. Afterwards, she studied the bachelor programme political science from 2010 to 2013 and the master programme global environment governance from 2013 to 2014 at the Vrije Universiteit Amsterdam.

== Career ==
She became involved with the Party for the Animals in 2010 as a volunteer for the then House of Representatives elections. From 2013 to 2016, Akerboom was national chairman of the PvdD youth organization PINK!. She was a communications officer at the party office and since 2015 a faction employee at the Amsterdam City Council, with animal welfare and the energy transition in the built environment in her portfolio, among other things.

In the House of Representatives elections of 15 March 2017, Akerboom came in twelfth place on the PvdD candidate list, which was not enough to be directly elected. From 16 October 2018 to 4 February 2019, she was a member of the House of Representatives in a temporary vacancy due to the maternity leave of Femke Merel van Kooten-Arissen. During her membership of the House of Representatives, she was the youngest sitting member of the House of Representatives.

In the House of Representatives elections of 17 March 2021, Akerboom came in seventh place on the PvdD candidate list, which was not enough to be directly elected. Akerboom then continued to work in the communications department of the House of Representatives faction. From 13 October 2022 to 1 February 2023, she was a temporary Member of Parliament, this time due to illness leave of party leader Esther Ouwehand. From 10 May 2023 to 11 August 2023 she was again a temporary Member of Parliament, this time due to Leonie Vestering's sick leave. Akerboom was yet again installed on 27 September 2023 in the vacancy created by Vestering's resignation on 26 September 2023.

== Personal life ==
Akerboom is a vegan.

== Electoral history ==
Electoral history of Eva Akerboom
Year	Body	Party	Pos.	Votes	Result		Ref.
Year	Body	Party	Pos.	Votes	Party seats	Individual	Ref.
2017	House of Representatives	Party for the Animals	12	2,586	5	Lost (Note: Akerboom was appointed to the body later during the term due to a vacancy.)	
2021	House of Representatives	Party for the Animals	7	10,103	6	Lost	
2023	House of Representatives	Party for the Animals	5	7,064	3	Lost	
2024	European Parliament	Party for the Animals	37 (Note: Akerboom participated as a lijstduwer.)	626	1	Lost	
