= Nico Drost =

Dutch politician

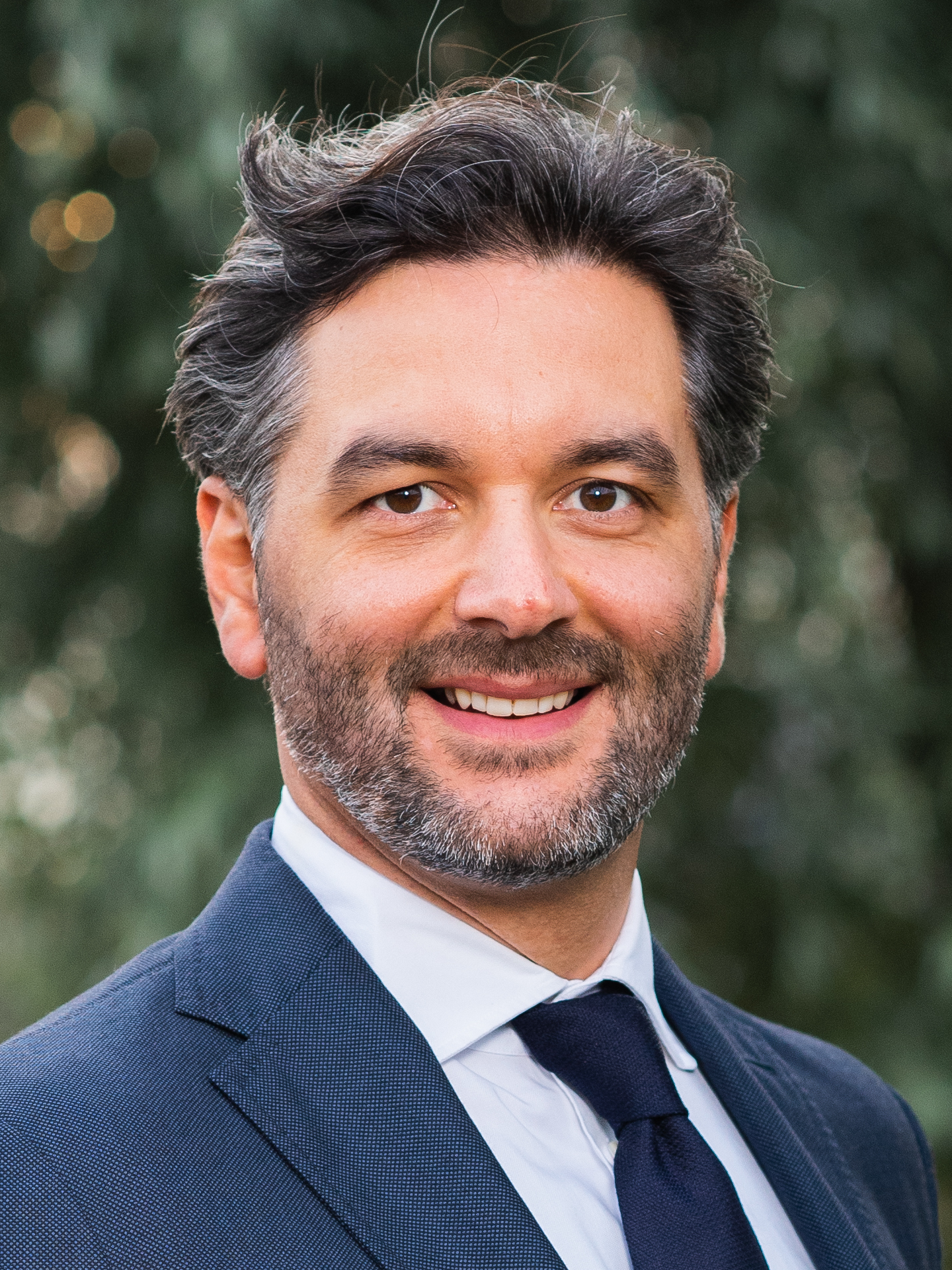

Member of the Dutch House of Representatives
- In office 25 January 2023 – 5 December 2023
- Preceded by: Gert-Jan Segers

Personal details
- Born: 19 July 1980 (age 45) Rhenen, Netherlands
- Party: Christian Union

Nicolaas (Nico) Drost (born 19 July 1980) is a Dutch politician from the Christian Union who has served as a member of the House of Representatives in 2023.

== Electoral history ==
Electoral history of Nico Drost
Year	Body	Party	Pos.	Votes	Result		Ref.
Year	Body	Party	Pos.	Votes	Party seats	Individual	Ref.
2017	House of Representatives	Christian Union	9	670	5	Lost (Note: Drost was appointed to the body later during the term due to a vacancy.)	
2021	House of Representatives	Christian Union	8	1,080	5	Lost	
2023	House of Representatives	Christian Union	6	2,295	3	Lost	
2025	House of Representatives	Christian Union	6	803	3	Lost	

== See also ==
- List of members of the House of Representatives of the Netherlands, 2021–2023
