= Bart Snels =

Dutch economist and politician (born 1966)

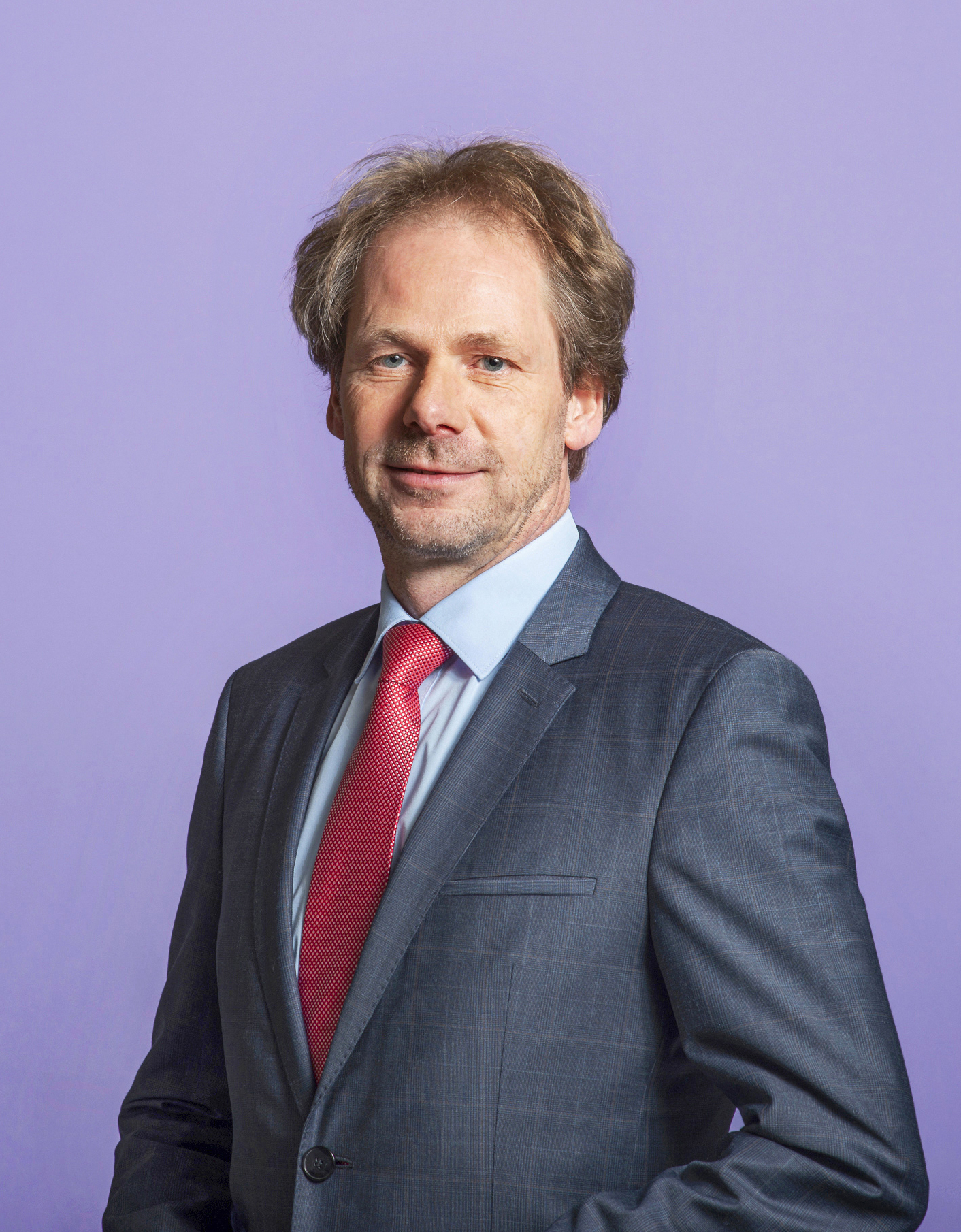
- Snels in 2020

Member of the Dutch House of Representatives
- In office 23 March 2017 – 26 October 2021
- Succeeded by: Suzanne Kröger

Personal details
- Born: Bartholomeus Adrianus Wilhelmus Snels; 6 January 1966 (age 60) Roosendaal, Netherlands
- Party: GroenLinks (1991–2010; 2014–present)
- Other political affiliations: D66 (2012–2013)
- Education: Catholic University Brabant Utrecht University (PhD)
- Occupation: Economist; politician

Bartholomeus Adrianus Wilhelmus "Bart" Snels (born 6 January 1966) is a Dutch economist and politician. From 27 March 2017 to 26 October 2021 he was a member of the House of Representatives for GroenLinks. He was an editor at Buitenhof, political coordinator of the GroenLinks House of Representatives faction, director of the GroenLinks Scientific Bureau and political advisor and copywriter for Jesse Klaver.

== Early life and education ==
Snels studied general economics at the Catholic University Brabant. Between 1991 and 1993 he did his alternative military service at the scientific bureau De Helling of GroenLinks. Between 1993 and 1996 he worked on a dissertation at Utrecht University.

== Career ==
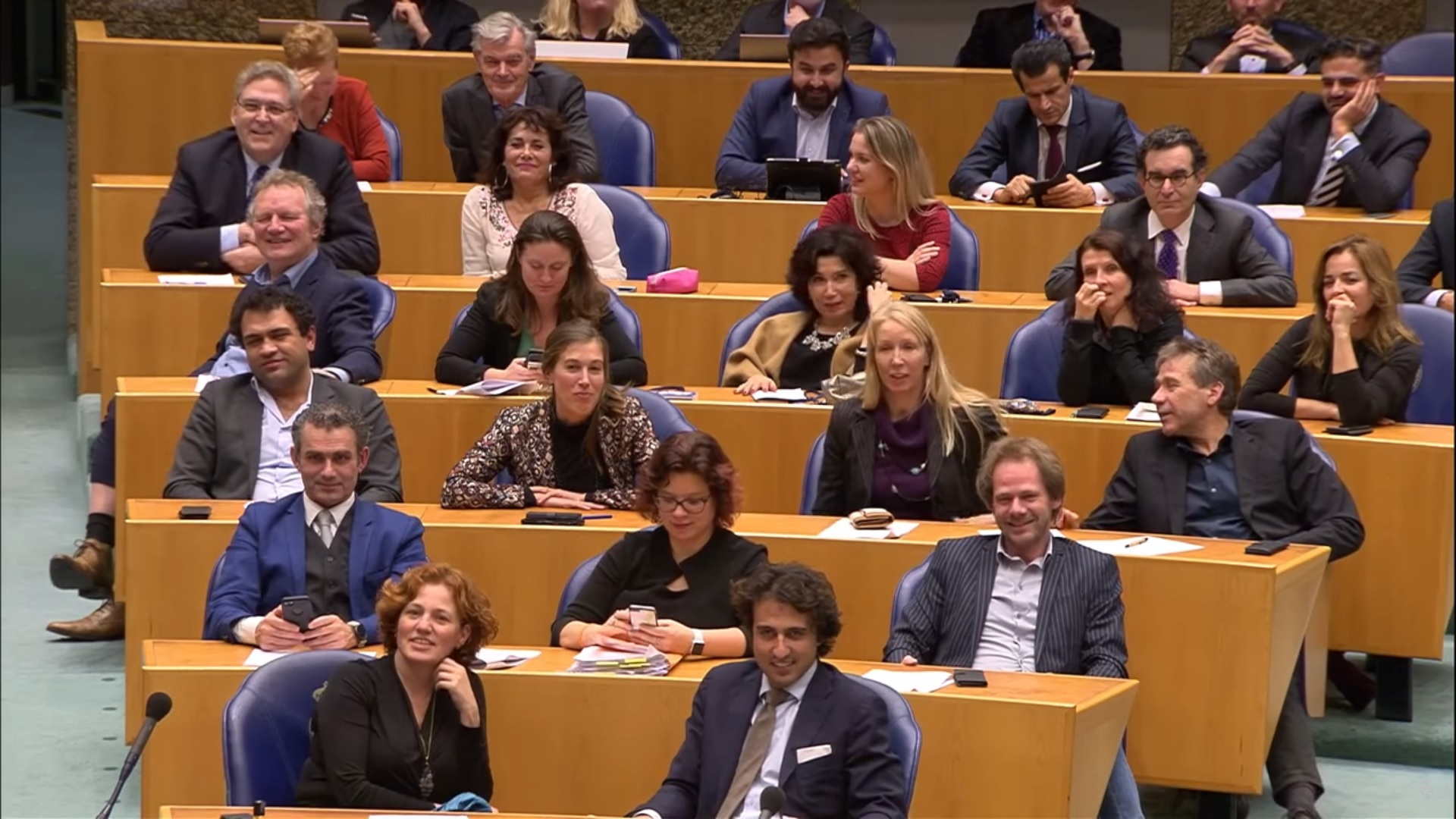
Bart Snels (rightmost man on the second row) in the House of Representatives in 2017

Subsequently, Snels worked as a policy officer for public housing, economics and finance for the GroenLinks faction in the House of Representatives until 2001. In addition, between 1998 and 2001 he was a part-time assistant professor of economics at the Faculty of Public Administration at the University of Twente. In 1999 he published Politics in the Dutch Economy: The Economics of Institutional Interaction, in which he investigated how the political colour of the Dutch cabinet influences developments in the Dutch economy, an adaptation of his dissertation.

Between 2001 and 2003 he worked as a coordinating policy officer and theme coordinator for social security and the labor market at the Ministry of Finance. He then worked at FEM Business between 2003 and 2004 as an editor of macroeconomics and economic policy.

Between 2004 and 2010 he was director of bureau De Helling. As secretary, he participated in various program committees of GroenLinks, including the election program in 2006 and the party platform, which was submitted to the party congress in 2008. He also worked on various publications, including Vrijheid als Ideaal ('Freedom as Ideal'). This book stimulated the debate within GroenLinks about a liberal course. Snels was an important ideologue within GroenLinks. In 2009 he succeeded Tom van der Lee as head of information for the GroenLinks House of Representatives faction. He was succeeded as director of the scientific office by Dick Pels.

In 2011 Snels left GroenLinks. He was succeeded as political coordinator by Rutger Groot Wassink. In September 2011, Snels became an independent publicist. In 2012 he wrote the book Henk, Ingrid & Alexander, in which D66 politician Alexander Pechtold talks to people who voted for the right-wing populist Party for Freedom in the 2010 elections. Snels was also a member of Pechtold's campaign team during the 2012 elections.

In January 2014, Snels returned to journalism and became a senior editor at Buitenhof. Since 2015 he has worked again for the GroenLinks faction and became a speechwriter. In the 2017 House of Representatives elections, he was on the GroenLinks list in 9th place and was elected. He is the financial spokesperson for the faction. As a Member of Parliament, he submitted, among other things, the motion to institute a parliamentary inquiry into the benefits affair. The committee that was set up for this purpose concluded in its report Ongekend Onrecht ('Unknown Injustice') that the rule of law principles were being violated on a large scale, in the legislative, executive and judicial powers.

On 14 October 2021, he announced his departure from the House of Representatives as of October 27 that year. He did not agree with his party's extensive cooperation with the PvdA regarding the formation attempts for a new cabinet after the House of Representatives elections of March 2021. In a letter to Speaker of the House Vera Bergkamp, Snels wrote that he saw this collaboration as voter fraud.

Snels was appointed inspector general at the Taxes, Surcharges and Customs Inspectorate at the Ministry of Finance with effect from 1 February 2022 on the recommendation of Minister Hanke Bruins Slot of the Interior and Kingdom Relations.
