= Kiki Hagen =

Dutch politician (born 1987)

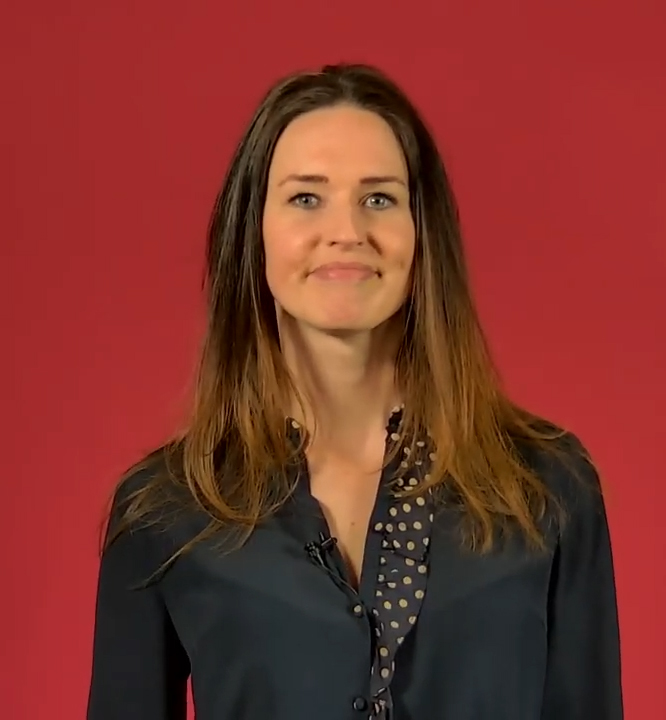
- Hagen in 2021

Member of the House of Representatives
- In office 31 March 2021 – 5 December 2023

Alderwoman of De Ronde Venen
- In office 26 April 2018 – 31 March 2021
- Succeeded by: Cees van Uden

Member of the Municipal Council of De Ronde Venen
- In office 27 March 2014 – 29 March 2018
- Succeeded by: Cees van Uden
- In office 3 January 2011 – 17 October 2013
- Succeeded by: Stef Koorn

Personal details
- Born: Kiki Babette Hagen; 6 January 1987 (age 39) Amsterdam, Netherlands
- Party: Democrats 66
- Other political affiliations: Lijst 8 (2010–2013)
- Children: 1
- Education: Utrecht University of Applied Sciences (B.Ed.)
- Occupation: Teacher, politician
- Website: kikihagen.nl

Kiki Babette Hagen (pronounced [ˈkiki ˈɦaːɣə(n)]; born 6 January 1987) is a Dutch politician of the Democrats 66 (D66) and an elementary school teacher. She was a member of the House of Representatives from the 2021 general election until 2023. She previously served as an alderwoman in the municipality De Ronde Venen. From 2011 to 2013 and from 2014 to 2018, she held a seat in the municipal council of that same municipality.

== Early life and teaching career ==
Hagen was born in Amsterdam and grew up in Vinkeveen, Utrecht. Her mother worked as a teacher, and her father owned a pub in the Amsterdam neighborhood of Jordaan. Hagen has a sister and attended the Mijdrecht secondary school Veenlanden College between 1999 and 2004 at havo level. She received her Bachelor of Education from the Utrecht University of Applied Sciences in 2010 and subsequently became a teacher at the Abcoude primary school OBS Piet Mondriaan. She also did a pre-master in public administration at the Vrije Universiteit Amsterdam in the years 2015–16. Hagen stopped teaching when she became an alderwoman in 2018.

== Local politics ==
In 2010, Hagen co-founded the local political party Lijst 8 (List 8) in De Ronde Venen and participated in the special municipal election that was held on 24 November in anticipation of the merger of the municipalities of De Ronde Venen and Abcoude on 1 January 2011. The party was founded to increase the representation of young people in the council and won two seats. Hagen, who was the party's lead candidate, was installed as a municipal councillor and as Lijst 8's caucus leader in January 2011.

She vacated her seat in the council to join Democrats 66 in October 2013. She was re-elected in the 2014 municipal election, being the top candidate of D66 in De Ronde Venen. Hagen received another term in the 2018 municipal election, again being her party's lead candidate, but went on maternity leave on the day of her swearing in. She did not return to the council, as she became an alderwoman and third deputy mayor of De Ronde Venen in April 2018. Hagen's portfolio included sustainability, the environment, education, and youth affairs. Waste and sewage were added to that when an alderman resigned in 2019.

In February 2021, local party Ronde Venen Belang asked questions about an €800 subsidy Hagen had received to make her house more sustainable. She subsequently paid back the money, and an investigation by the municipality later concluded that the subsidy had been wrongfully granted. A large majority of the council retained their trust in her.

== House of Representatives ==
Hagen was placed twenty-first on the candidate list of D66 for the 2021 general election. She was elected into the House of Representatives with 24,485 preferential votes – only three D66 candidates received more votes. Hagen was installed on 31 March and became D66's spokesperson for aviation, roads, mobility, the environment, and circular economy. She simultaneously left De Ronde Venen's municipal executive. In the House, Hagen is a member of the Committees for Agriculture, Nature and Food Quality; for Economic Affairs and Climate Policy; for Education, Culture and Science; for Infrastructure and Water Management; and for the Interior (chair), and she is on the Benelux Interparliamentary Consultative Council and the Interparliamentary Committee on the Dutch Language Union. Her specialties later changed to mbo, green education, lifelong learning, the environment, and circular economy. Hagen led a parliamentary delegation which in the summer of 2022 visited Suriname, Curaçao, and Bonaire for nine days to investigate the history of Dutch slavery. It was organized one year ahead of a remembrance year that marked 150 years since the abolition of slavery in the Netherlands. Besides, the Dutch government apologized for its history of slavery not long after the trip. Hagen criticized mass consumption of clothing during Black Friday and called it a "pitch-black day for our Earth". Simultaneously, she proposed several measures to mitigate the effects of the clothing industry on the environment. These included investments in circular clothing brands, higher penalties for greenwashing, and the introduction of an ecolabel such that consumers can make more informed decisions.

Hagen was chosen to serve as informateur in Amersfoort after D66 won a plurality there in the March 2022 municipal elections. A few weeks later, she advised a coalition consisting of D66, GroenLinks, the CDA, Amersfoort2014, and the Party for the Animals. The VVD had filed a motion of no confidence against Hagen during the process alleging false information, but it did not garner enough support in the council and the VVD later apologized for it. A coalition was eventually formed that included the Christian Union instead of Amersfoort2014 in July.

== Personal life ==
Hagen has a son, and she moved from Mijdrecht to The Hague while a member of parliament.

== Electoral history ==
Electoral history of Kiki Hagen
| Year | Body | Party | Pos. | Votes | Result | | Ref. |
| Year | Body | Party | Pos. | Votes | Party seats | Individual | Ref. |
|---|---|---|---|---|---|---|---|
| 2021 | House of Representatives | Democrats 66 | 21 | 24,485 | 24 | Won | |
| 2023 | House of Representatives | Democrats 66 | 38 | 1,782 | 9 | Lost | |
