= Suzanne Kröger =

Dutch politician (born 1976)

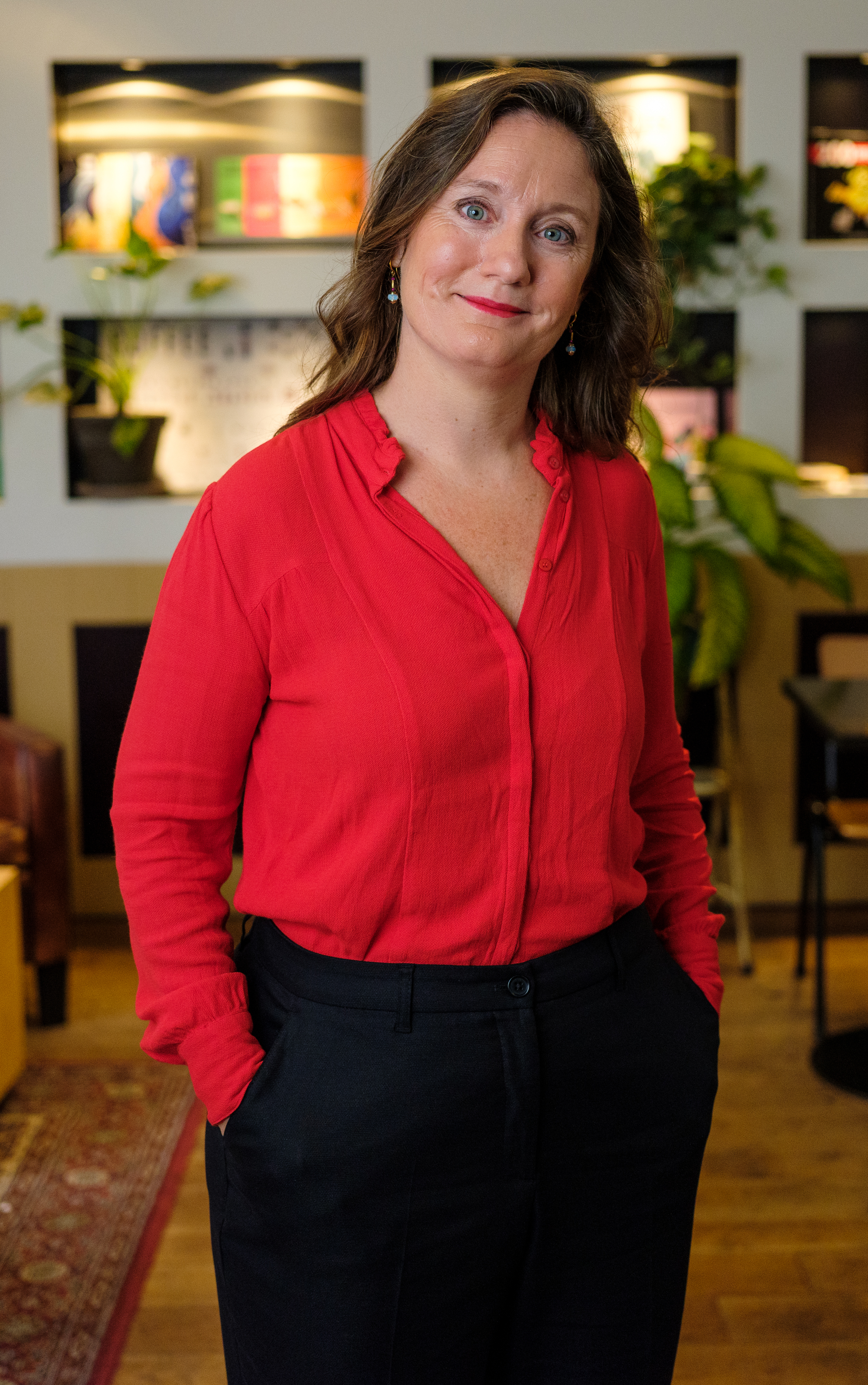

Member of the House of Representatives
- Incumbent
- Assumed office 27 October 2021
- Preceded by: Bart Snels
- In office 23 March 2017 – 31 March 2021

Personal details
- Born: Suzanne Caroline Kröger; 6 June 1976 (age 50) Amsterdam, Netherlands
- Party: GroenLinks (until 2026); PRO (since 2026)

Suzanne Caroline Kröger (born 6 June 1976) is a Dutch politician of Progressief Nederland (PRO), formerly of GroenLinks.

== Career ==
She worked for Greenpeace, contributing to campaigns for protection of old-growth forests and climate change prevention. She also worked in Indonesia for many years.

Kröger first served as a member of the House of Representatives between 23 March 2017 and 31 March 2021, and she replaced member of parliament Bart Snels starting in October 2021. Kröger was re-elected in November 2023 on the shared GroenLinks–PvdA list, and she became the party's spokesperson for climate and energy. In response to the global energy crisis, Kröger proposed spending €4.5 billion out of an existing climate change mitigation fund to insulate homes and establishing a national procurement organization to support the effort.

== Electoral history ==
Electoral history of Suzanne Kröger
Year	Body	Party	Pos.	Votes	Result		Ref.
Year	Body	Party	Pos.	Votes	Party seats	Individual	Ref.
2017	House of Representatives	GroenLinks	11	8,086	14	Won	
2021	House of Representatives	GroenLinks	7	9,655	8	Lost (Note: Kröger was not elected despite her party's result due to other candidates meeting the threshold for preference votes. However, she was appointed to the body later during the term due to a vacancy.)	
2023	House of Representatives	GroenLinks–PvdA	7	25,711	25	Won	
2025	House of Representatives	GroenLinks–PvdA	12	7,541	20	Won	
