= Leonie Vestering =

Dutch politician (born 1984)

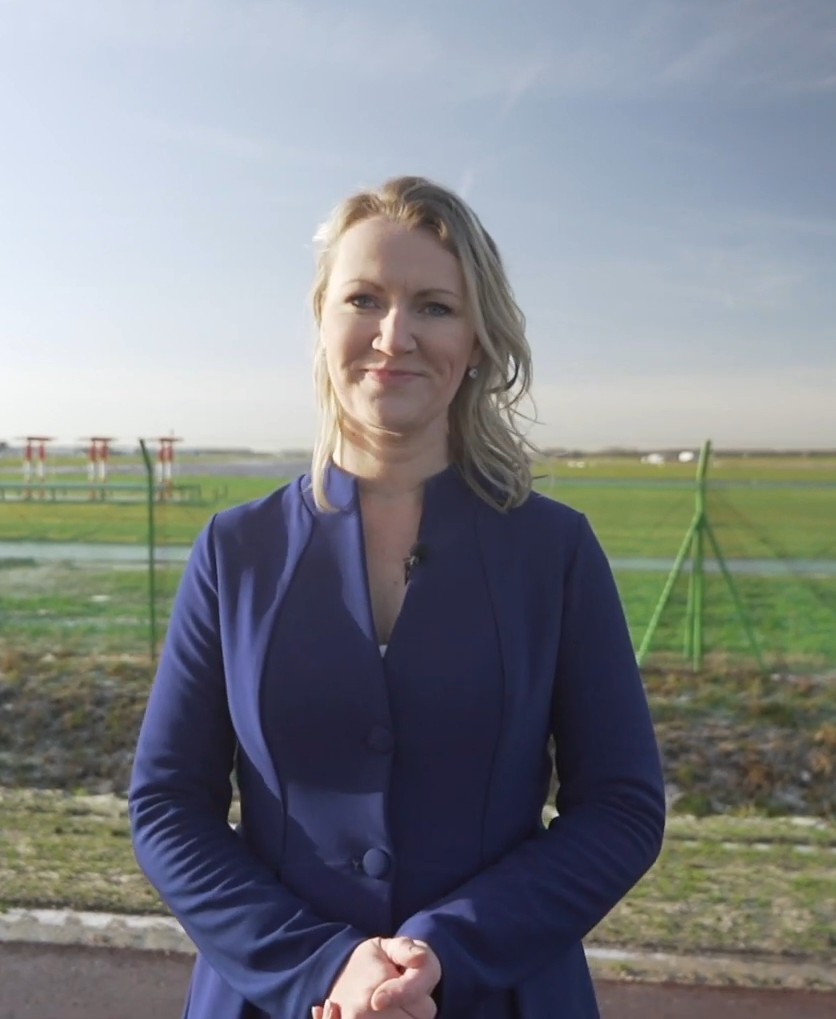

Member of the House of Representatives
- In office 11 August 2023 – 26 September 2023
- Succeeded by: Eva Akerboom
- In office 31 March 2021 – 8 May 2023
- Succeeded by: Eva Akerboom

Member of the States of Flevoland
- In office 26 March 2015 – 27 January 2021
- Succeeded by: Sylvia Kers

Member of the Almere municipal council
- In office 29 March 2018 – 21 January 2021
- Succeeded by: Martine Puhl

Personal details
- Born: 13 March 1984 (age 42) Uithoorn, Netherlands
- Party: Party for the Animals
- Children: 2

Leonie Vestering (born 13 March 1984) is a Dutch politician of the Party for the Animals (PvdD). She campaigned against the use of animals in circuses, and was a member of the States of Flevoland and the Almere municipal council. Vestering was elected to the House of Representatives in 2021 and resigned in September 2023 in response to a conflict within her party.

== Early life and career ==
Vestering was born in 1984 in the North Holland town Uithoorn and studied classical music at a music school and middle management. She worked at the CSR foundation MVO Nederland.

Starting in 2009, she was the director of the organization Wilde Dieren de Tent Uit (Wild animals out of the tent), that opposed the use of animals in circus. Circus performances by wild mammals in the Netherlands were prohibited in 2015. Because of this, the organization was dissolved. Vestering also served on the board of the anti-fur foundation Bont voor Dieren (Fur for animals) between 2014 and 2019.

== Politics ==
=== Regional and local ===
She participated in the 2015 provincial election in Flevoland as the Party for the Animals' lead candidate. Vestering won a seat in the States of Flevoland and was sworn in in March 2015 as caucus leader. There, she raised concerns about hunting geese. She also filed a criminal complaint for sex with animals after television program Rambam had shown how a zoo keeper was masturbating a dolphin at Dolfinarium Harderwijk. The public prosecutor's office decided not to prosecute, calling it part of an animal breeding program. Vestering subsequently argued for prohibiting shows involving dolphins. She was 23rd on the PvdD's party list for the 2017 general election, received 591 votes, and was not elected.

Vestering became a member of the Almere municipal council and the caucus leader of the Party for the Animals after appearing first on the party list during the 2018 municipal election. She was re-elected to the States of Flevoland the following year, again as the party's lead candidate. Vestering filed another criminal complaint in the summer of 2019 against Staatsbosbeheer, when about 150 horses in the nature reserve Oostvaardersplassen were held in a field without shade. She had also been the 18th candidate of the Party for the Animals in that year's European Parliament election, supporting a Dutch withdrawal from the European Union. She became a project coordinator of her party's caucus in the House of Representatives in 2020.

=== House of Representatives (2021–2023) ===
Vestering ran for member of parliament (MP) again in the 2021 general election, being placed third on the PvdD's party list. She stopped as caucus leader in the States of Flevoland and the Almere council in December 2020 after the list had been announced, and she resigned from both political bodies the following month. Vestering was elected with 6,992 preference votes as one of six Party for the Animals members of parliament, and she was sworn into office on 31 March. In the House, she is a member of the Committee for Agriculture, Nature and Food Quality, and she is her party's spokesperson for cattle farming, agriculture, zoonoses, the human impact on the nitrogen cycle, the Netherlands Food and Consumer Product Safety Authority, pesticides, animal rights, food, nature, biodiversity, and wild animals.

In May 2021, she filed an amendment to the Animal Act, which was passed by both houses of parliament and says that animals should be able to show their natural behavior when in captivity. Vestering clarified that her amendment would mainly regulate farm animals after concerns that it would have large effects on keeping pets. A legal review requested by the cabinet concluded that its language was too vague and that such a major reform of the agricultural sector would not be achievable within a year. Minister of Agriculture, Nature and Food Quality Piet Adema subsequently announced in late 2022 that its implementation would be postponed to 2024. Furthermore, he planned to draft a covenant with the sector and nature conservation organizations in the meantime and to send it to parliament as a replacement of the amendment. Vestering criticized those steps, saying that the parliament's decision was ignored in favor of industry self-regulation. Vestering's amendment was replaced by a less strict version in the next House term. Vestering also commented on the future of farming when the cabinet set goals to significantly reduce reactive nitrogen emissions, of which the sector is a major contributor, following a decision by the Council of State on the issue. She said that many farmers would have to seek a different profession and that livestock farming in the Netherlands would end, a development she lauded. In September 2023, a motion by Vestering and Laura Bromet (GroenLinks) was carried that called on Minister Adema to vote against a ten-year renewal of a permit of the European Union to allow the usage of systemic herbicide and crop desiccant glyphosate amidst concerns of carcinogenicity and adverse effects on biodiversity. A majority of the House subsequently reprimanded Adema when he announced he would instead abstain from the vote.

Vestering went on sick leave starting 9 May 2023 and was temporarily replaced by Eva Akerboom. In a statement, Vestering said her leave was on the advice of a physician based on her working conditions. She mentioned she had discovered the importance of good health following a life-threatening illness the year before after having been infected by a flesh-eating bacteria, from which she had recovered well. Vestering returned to the House on 11 August. The month before, the fourth Rutte cabinet had collapsed, resulting in a November snap election. A crisis broke out within the Party for the Animals on 9 September when its board reversed its decision to renominate Esther Ouwehand as the party's lead candidate due to alleged integrity violations. Vestering reacted that these should be carefully investigated. She announced on 12 September that she would resign, saying she could no longer fight for animal rights under the circumstances. She declined to provide further comment on the struggle, but she did mention she had involved House Speaker Vera Bergkamp after the situation within the caucus had derailed. The NRC reported that Ouwehand had been ignoring Vestering completely for a year following a disagreement about the composition of the caucus. On 14 September 2023, when the Party for the Animals presented its party list for the election, Vestering stated she had turned down the second spot. Her resignation went into effect on 26 September, and she was again succeeded by Eva Akerboom.

== Personal life ==
Vestering lives in Almere, is married, and has a daughter and a son. She can play the French horn.
