= Gijs van Dijk =

Dutch politician (born 1980)

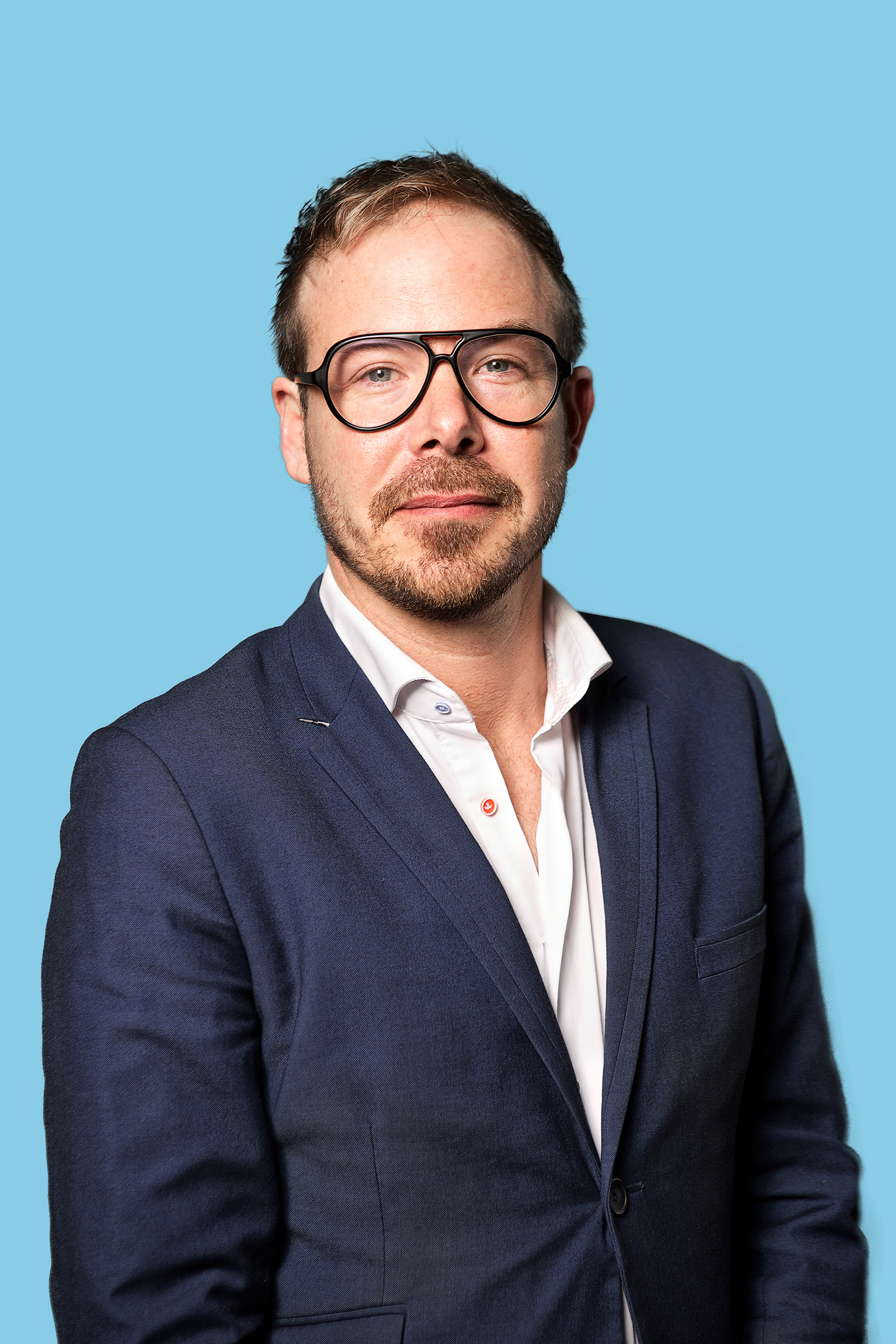
- Gijs van Dijk in 2017

Member of the House of Representatives
- In office 23 March 2017 – 8 February 2022

Personal details
- Born: Gijs Jan van Dijk; 11 October 1980 (age 45) Leiden, Netherlands
- Party: Labour Party (until 2002, from 2016)
- Other political affiliations: GreenLeft (between 2002 and 2016)

Gijs Jan van Dijk (Note: The phrase Gijs Jan van Dijk is pronounced [ɣɛi ˈɕɑɱ vɑn ˈdɛik]. The words in isolation are pronounced [ɣɛis], [jɑn], [vɑn] and [dɛik].) (born 11 October 1980) is a Dutch politician and former union leader. He was a member of the House of Representatives for the Labour Party between 23 March 2017 and 8 February 2022.

He resigned from the lower house after accusations of undesirable behaviour in the private sphere. A research bureau hired by the party concluded that he had displayed norm-breaking behaviour in and outside the private sphere. Discussion arose about these conclusions and the handling of the investigation by the Labour Party. In several articles it was discussed whether behavior of politicians in the private sphere should always be part of the public discourse. A commission dedicated to the case concluded that the matter was private and should have stayed that way; his party PvdA made apologies and welcomed Van Dijk back.
