= Oldenzijl =

- Village
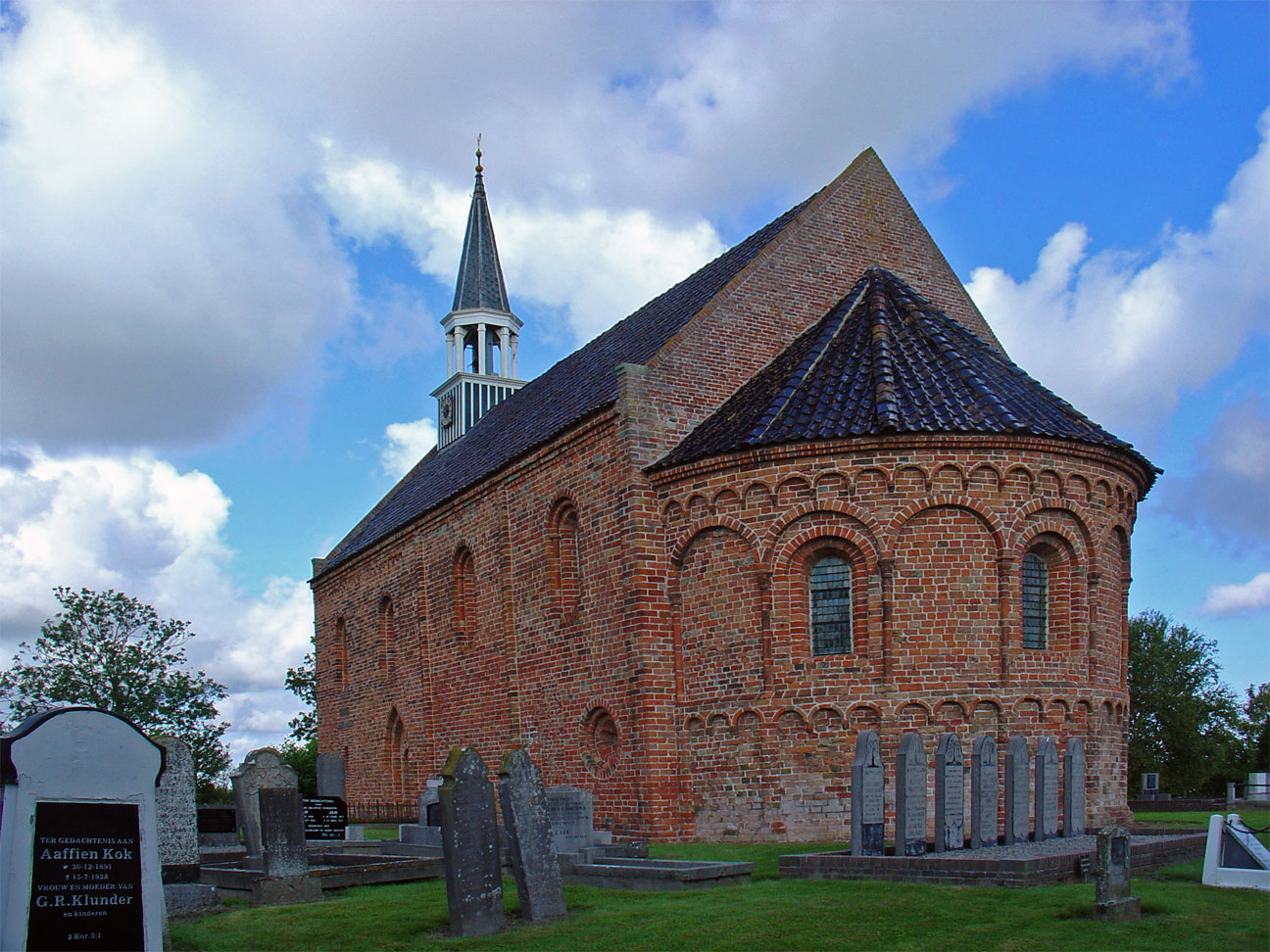
- St Nicolas' Church

- Location of Oldenzijl in the province of Groningen Oldenzijl (Netherlands)
- Coordinates: 53°24′N 6°43′E
- Country: Netherlands
- Province: Groningen
- Municipality: Het Hogeland

Area
  - Total: 0.18 km^{2} (0.069 sq mi)
- Elevation: 0.8 m (2.6 ft)

Population (2021)
  - Total: 60
  - Density: 330/km^{2} (860/sq mi)
- Time zone: UTC+1 (CET)
  - Summer (DST): UTC+2 (CEST)
- Postal code: 9986
- Dialing code: 0595

Oldenzijl is a small village in Het Hogeland municipality in the Dutch province of Groningen. It had a population of around 45 in January 2017.

== History ==
It was part of Uithuizermeeden municipality before 1979, when it became part of Hefshuizen.

== Gallery ==
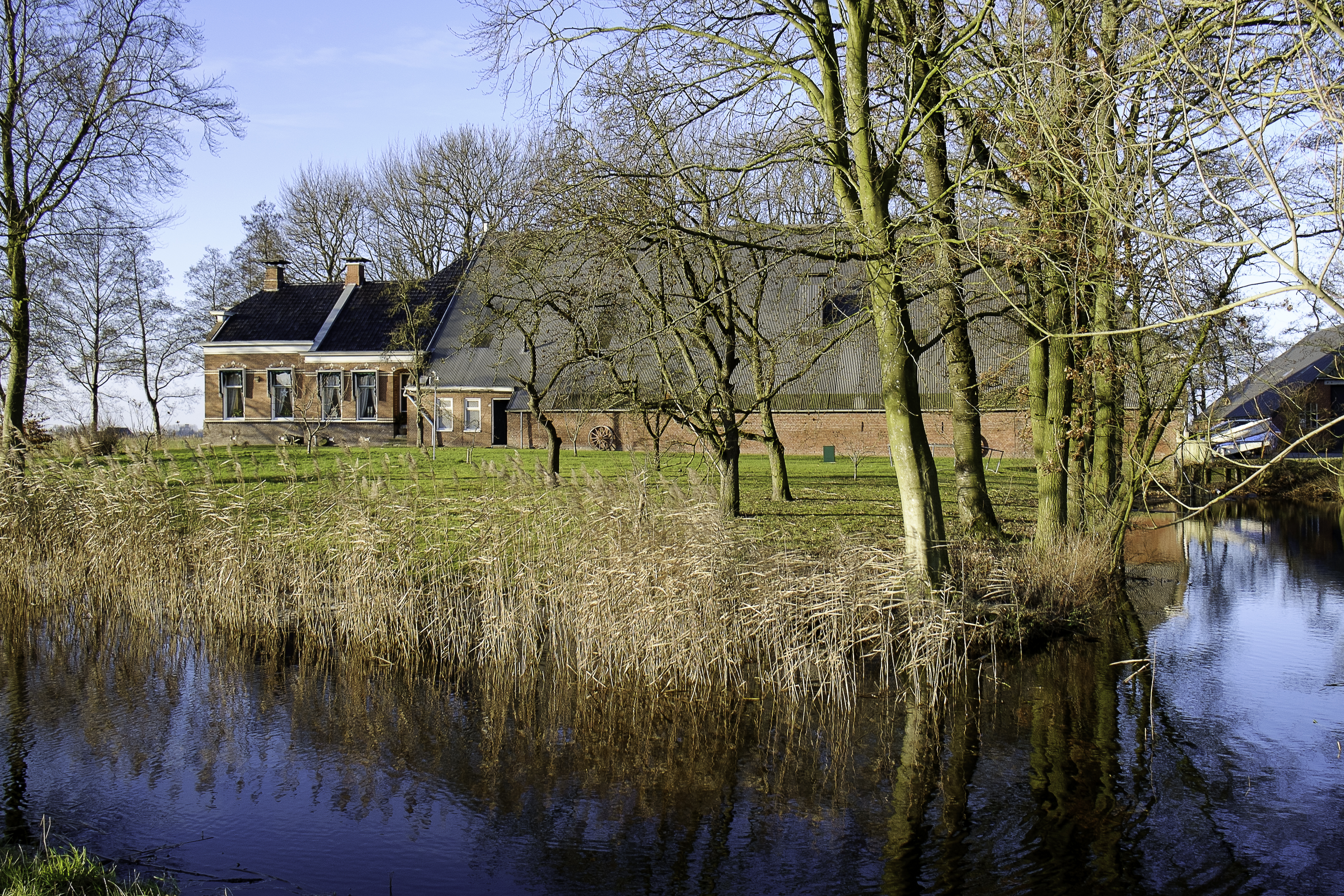
Farm in Oldenzijl

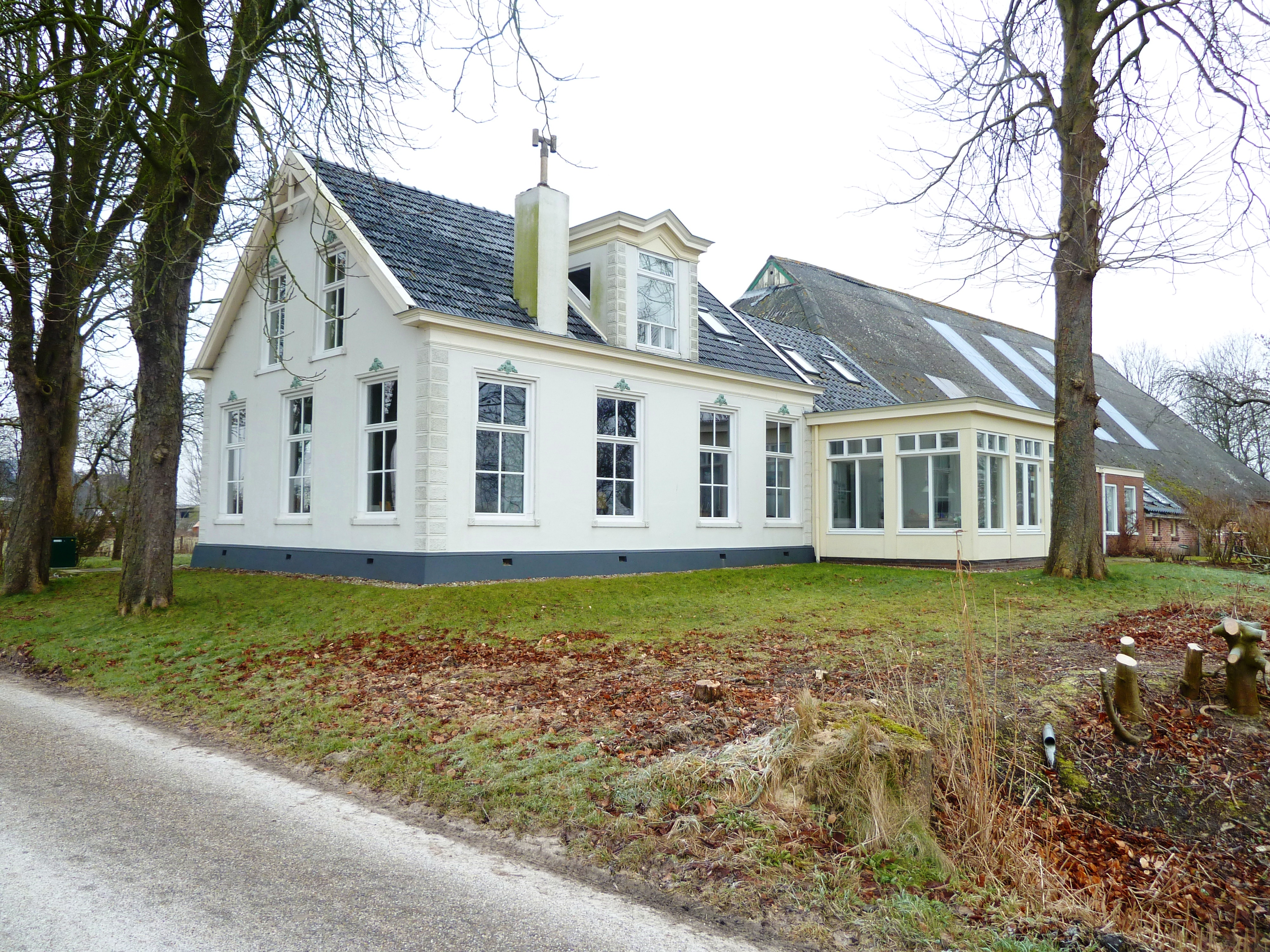
Farm in Oldenzijl

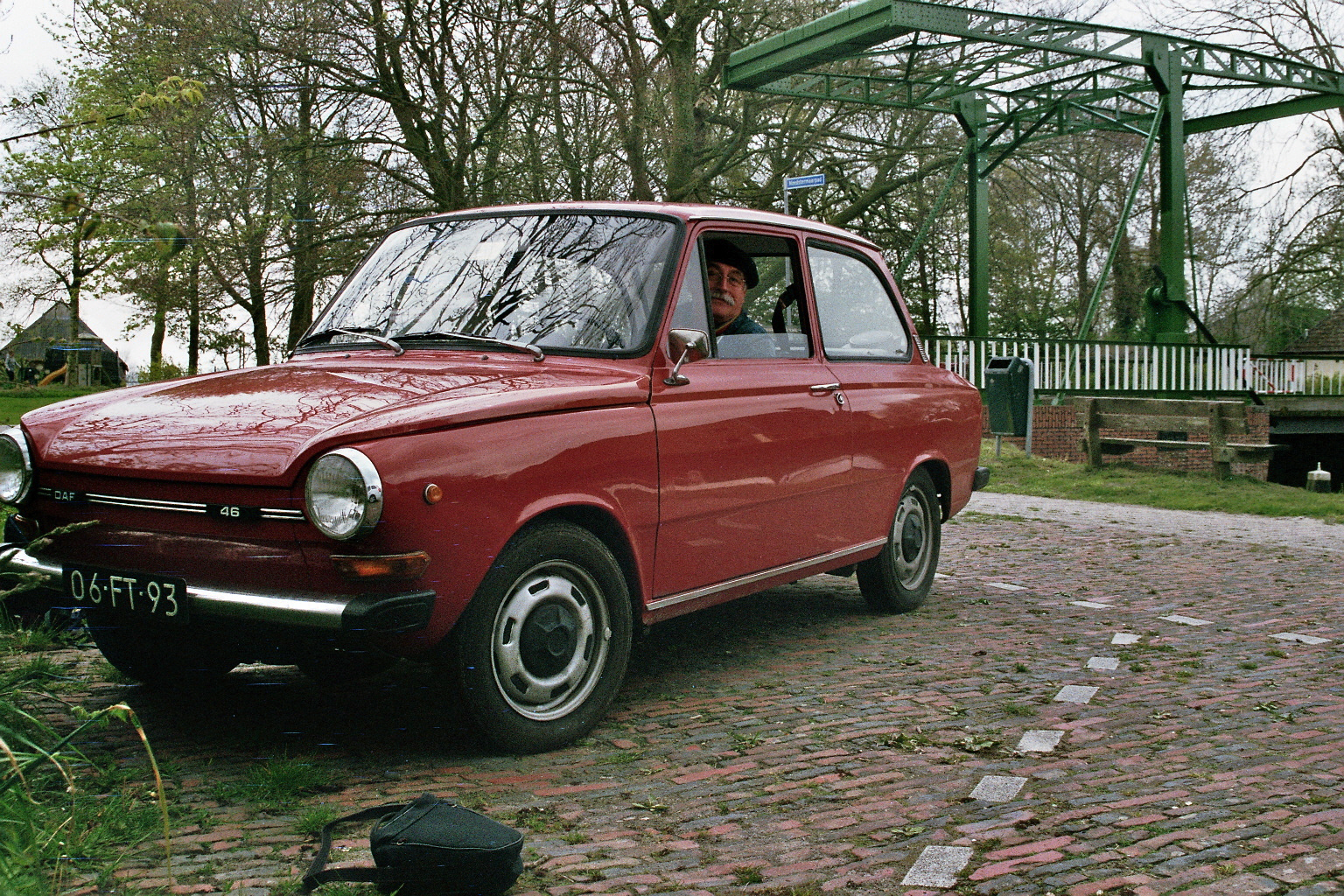
DAF 46 in Oldenzijl

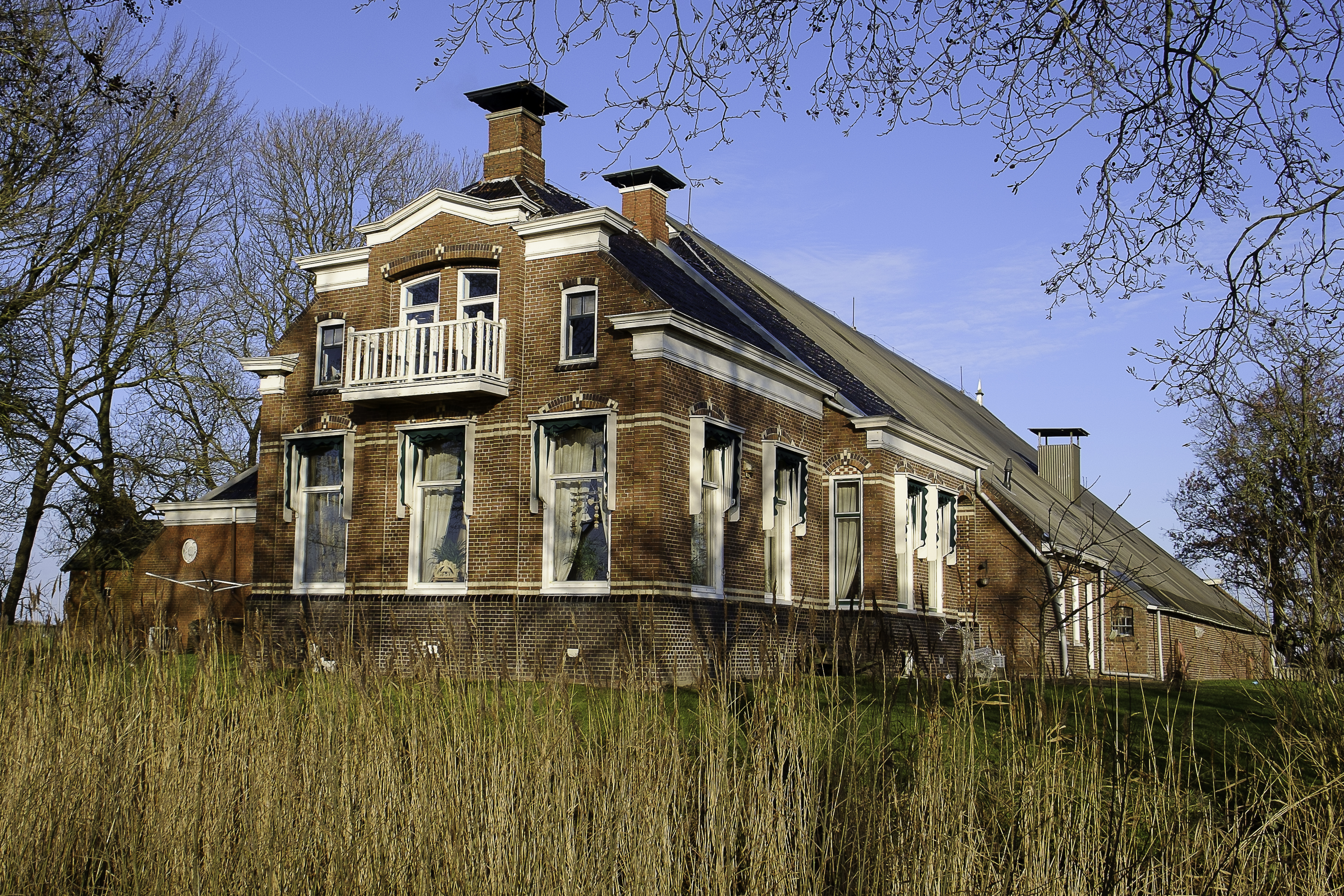
Farm in Oldenzijl
