= List of candidates in the 2019 European Parliament election in the Netherlands =

List of candidates for the 2019 European Parliament election in the Netherlands

The 2019 European Parliament election for the election of the delegation from the Netherlands was held on 23 May 2019.

== Background ==
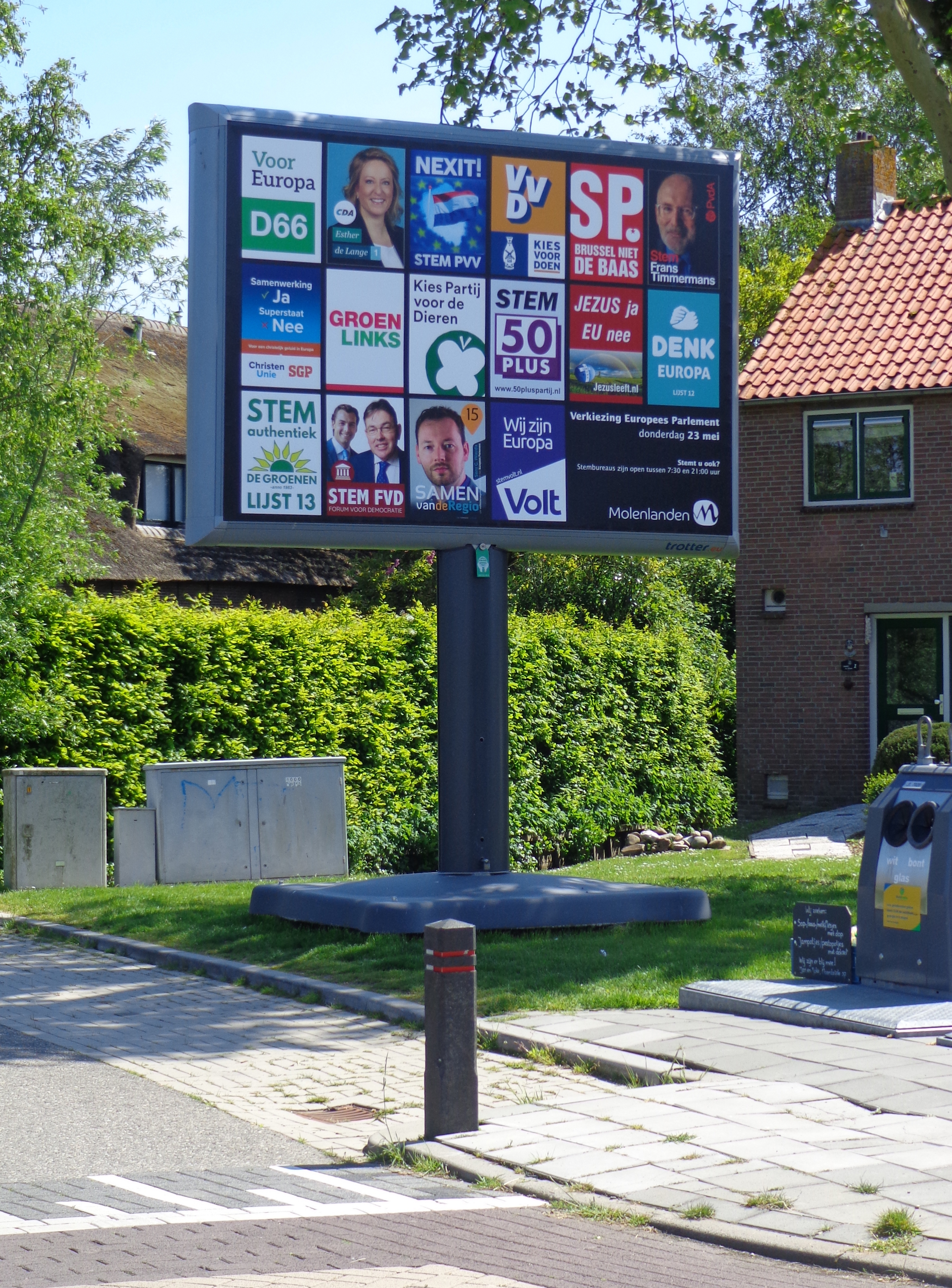

=== Numbering of the candidates list ===
Candidate lists for the 2019 European Parliament election in the Netherlands
| List | | English translation | List name (Dutch) |
|---|---|---|---|
| 1 | list | Democrats 66 (D66) | Democraten 66 (D66) |
| 2 | list | CDA - European People's Party | CDA - Europese Volkspartij |
| 3 | list | PVV (Party for Freedom) | PVV (Partij voor de Vrijheid) |
| 4 | list | VVD | VVD |
| 5 | list | SP (Socialist Party) | SP (Socialistische Partij) |
| 6 | list | P.v.d.A./European Social Democrats | P.v.d.A./Europese Sociaaldemocraten |
| 7 | list | Christian Union-SGP | ChristenUnie–SGP |
| 8 | list | GreenLeft | GROENLINKS |
| 9 | list | Party for the Animals | Partij voor de Dieren |
| 10 | list | 50PLUS | 50PLUS |
| 11 | list | Jesus Lives | Jezus Leeft |
| 12 | list | DENK | DENK |
| 13 | list | The Greens | De Groenen |
| 14 | list | Forum for Democracy | Forum voor Democratie |
| 15 | list | Of the Region & Pirate Party | vandeRegio & Piratenpartij |
| 16 | list | Volt Netherlands | Volt Nederland |

== Democrats 66 (D66) - ALDE ==
Candidate list for Democrats 66
| Number | Candidate | Votes | Result | Ref. |
|---|---|---|---|---|
| 1 | Sophie in 't Veld | 248,383 | Elected | |
| 2 | Raoul Boucke | 22,500 | Elected | |
| 3 | Samira Rafaela | 32,510 | | |
| 4 | Felix Klos | 8,451 | | |
| 5 | Emily van de Vijver | 17,269 | | |
| 6 | John Nederstigt | 2,175 | | |
| 7 | Sjoerd Warmerdam | 6,938 | | |
| 8 | Raquel Garcia Hermida van der Walle | 6,517 | | |
| 9 | Susanne Caarls | 4,894 | | |
| 10 | Bastiaan Winkel | 1,014 | | |
| 11 | Anita Pannebakker | 2,868 | | |
| 12 | Vic van Dijk | 4,044 | | |
| 13 | Rita Braam-van Valkengoed | 2,012 | | |
| 14 | Andor Admiraal | 723 | | |
| 15 | Emma Laurijssens-van Engelenhoven | 2,693 | | |
| 16 | Eva van Wijngaarden | 5,857 | | |
| 17 | Franklin Boon | 1,065 | | |
| 18 | Andreas Zenthöfer | 210 | | |
| 19 | Conny van Stralen | 1,042 | | |
| 20 | Stef Stevens | 1,294 | | |
| 21 | Fons van der Ham | 667 | | |
| 22 | Johanna Boogerd-Quaak | 979 | | |
| 23 | Thierry de Heer | 621 | | |
| 24 | Caecilia van Peski | 1,389 | | |
| 25 | Jan Terlouw | 13,577 | | |
| Total | | 389,692 | | |

== CDA - European People's Party ==
Candidate list for the Christian Democratic Appeal
| Number | Candidate | Votes | Result | Ref. |
|---|---|---|---|---|
| 1 | Esther de Lange | 402,975 | Elected | |
| 2 | Jeroen Lenaers | 50,121 | Elected | |
| 3 | Tom Berendsen | 28,579 | Elected | |
| 4 | Annie Schreijer | 113,914 | Elected | |
| 5 | Henk Jan Ormel | 11,084 | Replacement | |
| 6 | Chantal Hakbijl | 10,867 | | |
| 7 | Daan Versteeg | 5,750 | | |
| 8 | Sjaak van der Tak | 8,058 | | |
| 9 | Eveline Herben | 5,871 | | |
| 10 | Robert de Wit | 5,640 | | |
| 11 | Jimmy Bastings | 1,132 | | |
| 12 | Caspar Rutten | 3,772 | | |
| 13 | Theo Alkemade | 5,867 | | |
| 14 | Friso Douwstra | 6,683 | | |
| 15 | Bas Jan van Bochove | 1,521 | | |
| 16 | Albert Jan Maat | 2,094 | | |
| 17 | Karla Peijs | 5,627 | | |
| Total | | 669,555 | | |

== PVV (Party for Freedom) ==
Candidate list for the Party for Freedom
| Number | Candidate | Votes | Result | Ref. |
|---|---|---|---|---|
| 1 | Marcel de Graaff | 81,073 | Replacement | |
| 2 | Olaf Stuger | 5,127 | | |
| 3 | Auke Zijlstra | 7,007 | | |
| 4 | Andre Elissen | 1,861 | | |
| 5 | Ino van den Besselaar | 2,516 | | |
| 6 | Marco Deen | 1,733 | | |
| 7 | Menno Ludriks | 840 | | |
| 8 | Maikel Boon | 1,946 | | |
| 9 | Patricia van der Kammen | 8,627 | | |
| 10 | Geert Wilders | 83,448 | | |
| Total | | 194,178 | | |

== VVD ==
Candidate list for the People's Party for Freedom and Democracy
| Number | Candidate | Votes | Result | Ref. |
|---|---|---|---|---|
| 1 | Malik Azmani | 365,155 | Elected | |
| 2 | Jan Huitema | 115,738 | Elected | |
| 3 | Caroline Nagtegaal-van Doorn | 163,279 | Elected | |
| 4 | Bart Groothuis | 21,353 | Replacement | |
| 5 | Liesje Schreinemacher | 37,519 | Elected | |
| 6 | Catharina Rinzema | 14,749 | Replacement | |
| 7 | Roelien Kamminga | 10,187 | | |
| 8 | Martijn Grevink | 4,047 | | |
| 9 | Monique Fasol | 9,895 | | |
| 10 | Michael Pistecky | 2,406 | | |
| 11 | Maurice Hoogeveen | 2,447 | | |
| 12 | Sjoerd Bakker | 6,730 | | |
| 13 | Jacques Michel Bloi | 4,781 | | |
| 14 | René Bos | 3,124 | | |
| 15 | Marc Clercx | 869 | | |
| 16 | Boaz Adank | 9,768 | | |
| 17 | Dominique Boelen | 4,079 | | |
| 18 | Igor Bal | 1,771 | | |
| 19 | Johan van Rijn | 2,548 | | |
| 20 | Christiaan Zwart | 2,723 | | |
| 21 | Anouk van Brug | 6,372 | | |
| 22 | Jeroen Janssen | 5,245 | | |
| 23 | Falco Hoekstra | 10,315 | | |
| Total | | 805,100 | | |

== SP (Socialist Party) ==
Candidates for the European Parliament from the SP
| SP candidates 1989 | (1989) |
| SP candidates 1994 | (1994) |
| SP candidates 1999 | (1999) |
| SP candidates 2004 | (2004) |
| SP candidates 2009 | (2009) |
| SP candidates 2014 | (2014) |
| SP candidates 2019 | (2019) |
| SP candidates 2024 | (2024) |

Candidate list for the Socialist Party
| Number | Candidate | Votes | Result | Ref. |
|---|---|---|---|---|
| 1 | Arnout Hoekstra | 93,809 | | |
| 2 | Jannie Visscher | 35,498 | | |
| 3 | Geert Ritsema | 3,792 | | |
| 4 | Remine Alberts-Oosterbaan | 4,169 | | |
| 5 | Fenna Feenstra | 10,846 | | |
| 6 | Sara Murawski | 2,033 | | |
| 7 | Wouter van der Staak | 1,321 | | |
| 8 | Diederik van der Loo | 878 | | |
| 9 | Ellen Verhoog | 3,153 | | |
| 10 | Ad Meijer | 1,096 | | |
| 11 | Daphne ten Klooster | 1,556 | | |
| 12 | Jannie Drenthe | 2,229 | | |
| 13 | Ton Heerschop | 1,362 | | |
| 14 | William van den Heuvel | 1,929 | | |
| 15 | Jan Zoll | 1,464 | | |
| 16 | Meltem Okcu | 1,907 | | |
| 17 | Josje Beukema | 1,751 | | |
| 18 | Diederik Olders | 356 | | |
| 19 | Tjitske Hoekstra | 627 | | |
| 20 | Ger van Unen | 633 | | |
| 21 | Rosita van Gijlswijk | 906 | | |
| 22 | Sibel Özoğul-Özen | 1,181 | | |
| 23 | Renske Helmer-Englebert | 1,876 | | |
| 24 | Jan de Wit | 2,623 | | |
| 25 | Jay Pahladsingh | 2,590 | | |
| 26 | Jos van der Horst | 1,117 | | |
| 27 | Nicole van Gemert | 1,164 | | |
| 28 | Lisa de Leeuw | 1,328 | | |
| 29 | Krista van Velzen | 2,030 | | |
| Total | | 185,224 | | |

== P.v.d.A./European Social Democrats ==
PvdA campaign poster

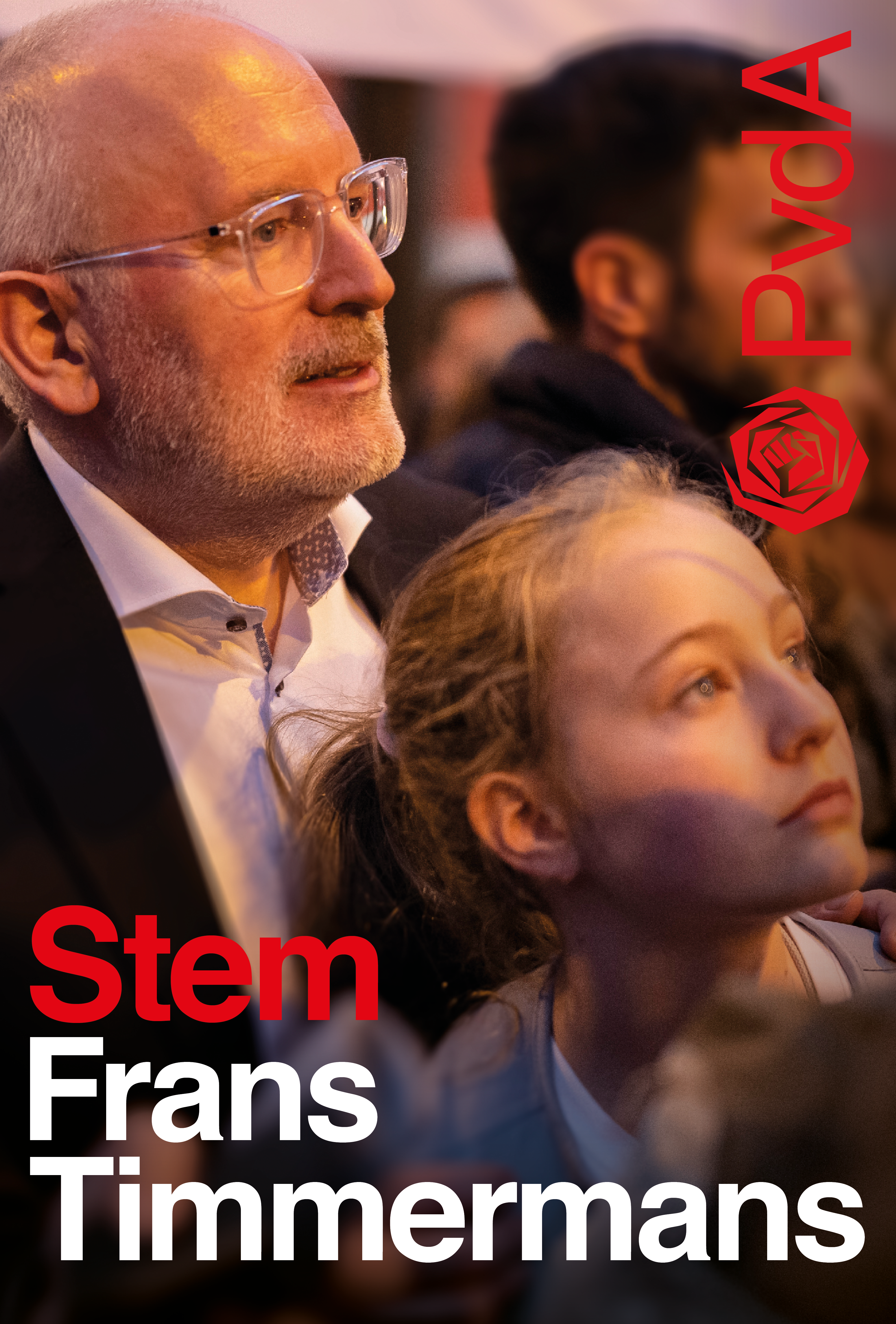
PvdA campaign poster

Candidate list for the Labour Party
| Number | Candidate | Votes | Result | Ref. |
|---|---|---|---|---|
| 1 | Frans Timmermans | 839,240 | Elected, but declined | |
| 2 | Agnes Jongerius | 109,987 | Elected | |
| 3 | Paul Tang | 8,497 | Elected | |
| 4 | Kati Piri | 29,475 | Elected | |
| 5 | Vera Tax | 12,760 | Elected | |
| 6 | Mohammed Chahim | 2,825 | Elected | |
| 7 | Lara Wolters | 4,888 | Replacement | |
| 8 | Thijs Reuten | 1,222 | Replacement | |
| 9 | Naomi Woltring | 5,339 | | |
| 10 | Ralph du Long | 1,736 | | |
| 11 | Fardau Procee | 3,502 | | |
| 12 | Mark Lauriks | 1,351 | | |
| 13 | Sham Ahmed | 3,545 | | |
| 14 | Kavish Bisseswar | 958 | | |
| 15 | Arina Angerman | 1,606 | | |
| 16 | Bart Pierik | 481 | | |
| 17 | Albert de Vries | 913 | | |
| 18 | Anja Timmer | 4,521 | | |
| 19 | Henk Deinum | 1,730 | | |
| 20 | Richard Moti | 1,509 | | |
| 21 | Jerzy Soetekouw | 717 | | |
| 22 | Max van den Berg | 3,301 | | |
| 23 | Hedy d'Ancona | 5,171 | | |
| Total | | 1,045,274 | | |

== Christian Union-SGP ==
Candidate list for CU-SGP
| Number | Candidate | Votes | Result | Ref. |
|---|---|---|---|---|
| 1 | Peter van Dalen | 240,459 | Elected | |
| 2 | Bert-Jan Ruissen | 44,416 | Elected | |
| 3 | Anja Haga | 37,813 | Replacement | |
| 4 | Anne Strijker | 4,723 | | |
| 5 | Henk van den Berge | 3,024 | | |
| 6 | Arjen Droog | 2,951 | | |
| 7 | Evert-Jan Brouwer | 2,600 | | |
| 8 | Simone Kennedy | 6,776 | | |
| 9 | Jannes de Jong | 634 | | |
| 10 | Gijsbrecht Gunter | 831 | | |
| 11 | Johanna Koffeman | 4,148 | | |
| 12 | Arnold Versteeg | 2,801 | | |
| 13 | Anil Kumar | 804 | | |
| 14 | Klariska ten Napel | 3,552 | | |
| 15 | Henk Massink | 410 | | |
| 16 | Jan Henk Verburg | 1,131 | | |
| 17 | Nathanaël Middelkoop | 3,325 | | |
| 18 | Patience Mayaki | 1,207 | | |
| 19 | Efraïm Hart | 1,479 | | |
| 20 | Leonard den Boef | 408 | | |
| 21 | Maaike Niemeijer | 1,502 | | |
| 22 | Henri Krooneman | 1,336 | | |
| 23 | Bryant Heng | 391 | | |
| 24 | Jarno Volmer | 393 | | |
| 25 | Hans Keuken | 931 | | |
| 26 | Rob Jonkman | 532 | | |
| 27 | Ardjan Boersma | 1,336 | | |
| 28 | Maarten van de Fliert | 1,110 | | |
| 29 | Don Ceder | 2,726 | | |
| 30 | Jan Schippers | 1,911 | | |
| Total | | 375,660 | | |

== GreenLeft ==
Candidate list for GroenLinks
| Number | Candidate | Votes | Result | Ref. |
|---|---|---|---|---|
| 1 | Bas Eickhout | 263,034 | Elected | |
| 2 | Tineke Strik | 149,628 | Elected | |
| 3 | Eline van Nistelrooij | 26,250 | | |
| 4 | Dirk-Jan Koch | 5,282 | | |
| 5 | Sabine Klok | 26,949 | | |
| 6 | Jasper Groen | 8,849 | | |
| 7 | Kim van Sparrentak | 32,505 | Elected | |
| 8 | Sander Chan | 2,441 | | |
| 9 | Jeroni Vergeer | 8,942 | | |
| 10 | Claudia Hofemann | 7,650 | | |
| 11 | Patricia Brunklaus | 3,069 | | |
| 12 | Sjoukje van Oosterhout | 5,652 | | |
| 13 | Hagar Roijackers | 5,132 | | |
| 14 | Mieke van der Vegt | 7,497 | | |
| 15 | Sylvana Rikkert | 6,052 | | |
| 16 | Touria Meliani | 9,782 | | |
| 17 | Marij Pollux | 3,520 | | |
| 18 | Glimina Chakor | 8,321 | | |
| 19 | Cathelijne Bouwkamp | 4,419 | | |
| 20 | Judith Sargentini | 14,309 | | |
| Total | | 599,283 | | |

== Party for the Animals ==
Candidate list for the Party for the Animals
| Number | Candidate | Votes | Result | Ref. |
|---|---|---|---|---|
| 1 | Anja Hazekamp | 136,224 | Elected | |
| 2 | Frank Wassenberg | 8,943 | | |
| 3 | Marco van der Wel | 2,838 | | |
| 4 | Johnas van Lammeren | 4,683 | | |
| 5 | Luuk van der Veer | 2,987 | | |
| 6 | Stephanie van Voorthuizen | 13,462 | | |
| 7 | Eva Akerboom | 12,290 | | |
| 8 | Carla van Viegen | 3,881 | | |
| 9 | Pascale Plusquin | 2,436 | | |
| 10 | Maaike Moulijn | 2,579 | | |
| 11 | Michelle van Doorn | 4,391 | | |
| 12 | Sebastiaan Wolswinkel | 1,774 | | |
| 13 | Matt Kanters | 1,274 | | |
| 14 | Falco van Hassel | 592 | | |
| 15 | Kelly Mannoesingh | 1,987 | | |
| 16 | Tim Feij | 943 | | |
| 17 | Kirsten de Wrede | 4,271 | | |
| 18 | Leonie Vestering | 1,428 | | |
| 19 | Ewald Engelen | 2,740 | | |
| 20 | Esther Ouwehand | 11,215 | | |
| Total | | 220,938 | | |

== 50PLUS ==
Candidate list for 50PLUS
| Number | Candidate | Votes | Result | Ref. |
|---|---|---|---|---|
| 1 | Toine Manders | 127,228 | Elected | |
| 1 | Roy Ho Ten Soeng | 7,454 | | |
| 3 | George Lernout | 2,707 | | |
| 4 | Emmy van der Kleij | 24,723 | | |
| 5 | Marlon van Dalen | 6,311 | | |
| 6 | Adriana Hernández Martínez | 3,351 | | |
| 7 | Wilma Richter | 4,198 | | |
| 8 | Nicoline Maarschalk Meijer | 3,683 | | |
| 9 | Bennie van Est | 3,023 | | |
| 10 | Sjef van Put | 1,913 | | |
| 11 | Johan Hessing | 842 | | |
| 12 | Roberto Schols | 763 | | |
| 13 | Helen Stuger | 476 | | |
| 14 | Lorenzo van der Weiden | 1,562 | | |
| 15 | Rob van den Hoek | 468 | | |
| 16 | Ándre van Wanrooij | 211 | | |
| 17 | Klaas Hamersma | 2,386 | | |
| 18 | Rosa Molenaar | 1,959 | | |
| 19 | Ruud van Acquoij | 221 | | |
| 20 | Monique Sanders | 1,334 | | |
| 21 | Frank Engelman | 690 | | |
| 22 | Roy Zuiverloon | 347 | | |
| 23 | Theo Hoppenbrouwers | 468 | | |
| 24 | Corrie van Brenk | 1,310 | | |
| 25 | Martin van Rooijen | 1,398 | | |
| 26 | Léonie Sazias | 5,536 | | |
| 27 | Henk Krol | 10,637 | | |
| Total | | 215,199 | | |

== Jesus Lives ==
Candidate list for the Jezus Leeft
| Number | Candidate | Votes | Result | Ref. |
|---|---|---|---|---|
| 1 | Florens van der Spek | 6,433 | | |
| 2 | M.J. Westhoven | 1,008 | | |
| 3 | J.A.C. van Ooijen | 851 | | |
| Total | | 8,292 | | |

== Denk ==
Candidate list for Denk
| Number | Candidate | Votes | Result | Ref. |
|---|---|---|---|---|
| 1 | Ayhan Tonca | 25,302 | | |
| 2 | Aiman El-Gharabawy | 1,400 | | |
| 3 | Nadia El Ouahdani | 2,940 | | |
| 4 | Gideon Everduim | 1,432 | | |
| 5 | Luiza Soares | 632 | | |
| 6 | Huda Sufyan | 746 | | |
| 7 | Naida Ribić-Gradečak | 868 | | |
| 8 | Harry van Heerden | 212 | | |
| 9 | Ibrahim Ghazi | 1,613 | | |
| 10 | Sarah Al-Rubey | 270 | | |
| 11 | Şerif Uysal | 456 | | |
| 12 | Gladys Albitrouw | 549 | | |
| 13 | Farid Azarkan | 3,899 | | |
| 14 | Tunahan Kuzu | 20,350 | | |
| Total | | 60,669 | | |

== The Greens ==
Candidate list for The Greens
| Number | Candidate | Votes | Result | Ref. |
|---|---|---|---|---|
| 1 | Paul Berendsen | 4,456 | | |
| 2 | Angela Zikking | 2,609 | | |
| 3 | Reina van Zwoll | 538 | | |
| 4 | Wim Bijma | 212 | | |
| 5 | Tom Bakkers | 108 | | |
| 6 | Luuk Hofman | 107 | | |
| 7 | Adriaan Smeekes | 186 | | |
| 8 | Nora Borsboom | 538 | | |
| 9 | Hans Baarslag | 178 | | |
| 10 | David Blik | 66 | | |
| 11 | Vera ter Haar- van Oyen | 548 | | |
| Total | | 9,546 | | |

== Forum for Democracy ==
Candidate list for the Forum for Democracy
| Number | Candidate | Votes | Result | Ref. |
|---|---|---|---|---|
| 1 | Derk Jan Eppink | 339,988 | Elected | |
| 2 | Rob Roos | 41,323 | Elected | |
| 3 | Rob Rooken | 10,143 | Replacement | |
| 4 | Dorien Rookmaker | 15,403 | Replacement | |
| 5 | Michiel Hoogeveen | 9,521 | Replacement | |
| 6 | Frederik Jansen | 6,071 | | |
| 7 | Sytze van Odijk | 6,335 | | |
| 8 | Gideon van Meijeren | 1,504 | | |
| 9 | Toine Beukering | 2,040 | | |
| 10 | Anton van Schijndel | 2,709 | | |
| 11 | Paul Frentrop | 2,759 | | |
| 12 | Thierry Baudet | 164,711 | Elected, but declined | |
| Total | | 602,507 | | |

== From the Region & Pirate Party ==
Candidate list for the From the Region and Pirate Party
| Number | Candidate | Votes | Result | Ref. |
|---|---|---|---|---|
| 1 | Sent Wierda | 4,291 | | |
| 2 | Ahmed Aarad | 800 | | |
| 3 | André Linnenbank | 697 | | |
| 4 | John Sweenen | 140 | | |
| 5 | Astrid Abendroth | 1,491 | | |
| 6 | Karim Maassen | 334 | | |
| 7 | Leo van Oudheusden | 135 | | |
| 8 | Maarten Wienbelt | 126 | | |
| 9 | Daniel van Tulder | 210 | | |
| 10 | Antoon Huigens | 74 | | |
| 11 | Rianne Orsel | 711 | | |
| 12 | Anne de Bruijn | 255 | | |
| 13 | Rakesh Mijling | 50 | | |
| 14 | Danny Werner | 78 | | |
| 15 | Teunis van Nes | 193 | | |
| 16 | Tim Weening | 102 | | |
| 17 | Khalid Chaudry | 71 | | |
| 18 | Jan Best | 141 | | |
| 19 | Gertjan Kleinpaste | 153 | | |
| 20 | Matthijs Pontier | 640 | | |
| Total | | 10,692 | | |

== Volt Netherlands ==
Candidate list for the Volt Netherlands
| Number | Candidate | Votes | Result | Ref. |
|---|---|---|---|---|
| 1 | Reinier van Lanschot | 51,621 | | |
| 2 | Nilüfer Vogels | 21,951 | | |
| 3 | Laurens Dassen | 1,973 | | |
| 4 | Bibi Wielinga | 9,465 | | |
| 5 | Lars Jongerius | 757 | | |
| 6 | Juliet Broersen | 3,342 | | |
| 7 | Chris Luth | 1,396 | | |
| 8 | Ilca Italianer | 1,641 | | |
| 9 | Coen van de Kraats | 285 | | |
| 10 | Liping Oerlemans | 1,340 | | |
| 11 | Tom Bolsius | 338 | | |
| 12 | Aida Tunović | 1,395 | | |
| 13 | Jasper Munnichs | 575 | | |
| 14 | Roos Habets | 2,329 | | |
| 15 | Jason Halbgewachs | 300 | | |
| 16 | Elske Kroesen | 841 | | |
| 17 | Koen Janssen | 342 | | |
| 18 | Doke Hoekstra | 353 | | |
| 19 | Boris van Bokhoven | 198 | | |
| 20 | Reyhan Çiğdem | 993 | | |
| 21 | Mark Coenen | 1,088 | | |
| 22 | Marieke Koekkoek | 1,599 | | |
| 23 | Elmar Theune | 1,201 | | |
| 24 | Justus de Visser | 681 | | |
| Total | | 106,004 | | |
