= Francesca Romana D'Antuono =

Italian politician (born 1987)

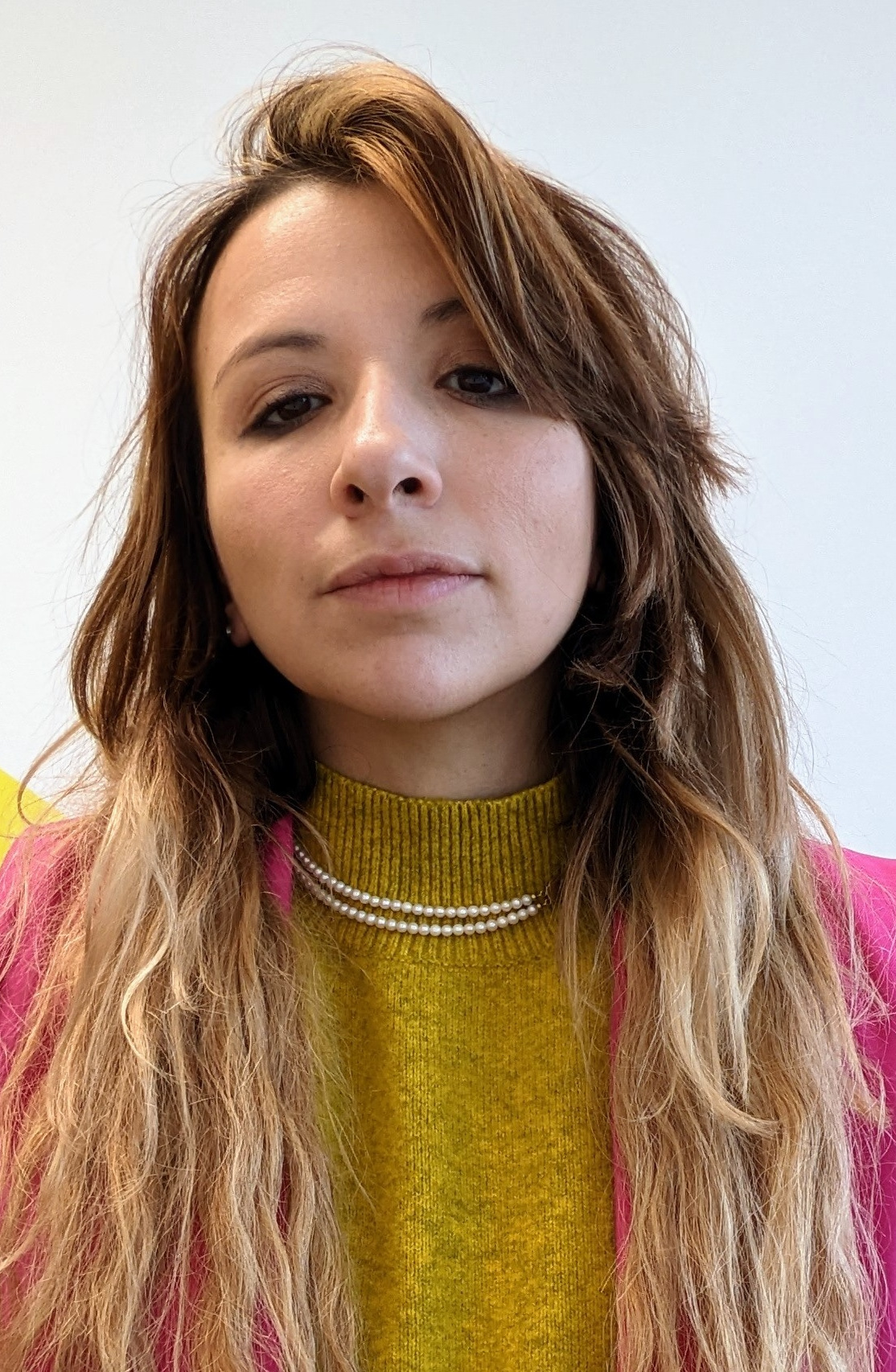
- D'Antuono in 2023

Co-President of Volt Europa
- In office November 2023 – July 2026
- In office October 2021 – November 2023

Personal details
- Born: 29 August 1987 (age 39) Vico Equense, Italy
- Party: Volt (since 2019)
- Children: 1
- Education: Sapienza University of Rome; University of Geneva
- Occupation: Pharmaceutical company executive

Francesca Romana D'Antuono (born 1987) is an Italian politician and the co-president of Volt Europa political party. After working in marketing, D'Antuono became involved with Volt. She served as a local coordinator for Volt Italia from 2019 to 2020 and later its coordinator of public relations. In October 2021, she was elected co-president of Volt Europa alongside Reinier van Lanschot. In November 2023, she was re-elected co-president, alongside Mels Klabbers from Volt Netherlands., a position that she held until the end of the term in July 2026. Currently, she is working as one of the main voices of the "Right to Housing! Now and Forever" European Citizens' Initiative.

== Life and Career ==
D'Antuono was born in the Italian region of Campania and grew up in Rome. She studied pharmacy at Sapienza University of Rome from 2006 to 2010, then continued her studies at the University of Geneva, later specializing in marketing, management, and health policy in 2014-2015. In subsequent years, she worked in marketing for AstraZeneca in Milan, Menarini in Florence, and Berlin-Chemie in Berlin.

=== Politics ===
From October 2021 until July 2026 D'Antuono served in a full-time role as Co-President of Volt Europa. Since the end of her second term as Volt Europa co-president she is still active in Volt, particularly as one of the main promoters of the "Right to Housing! Now and Forever" European Citizens' Initiative on the right to affordable housing.

=== Volt Italy and Europa ===
In September 2019 Francesca Romana D'Antuono was elected as a local coordinator for Volt Florence, a role she held from 2019 to 2020. Afterwards, she became the coordinator of the public relations team for Volt Italy.

In October 2021, she was elected co-president of Volt Europa alongside Reinier van Lanschot. During her tenure, she has supported various national elections for local Volt representatives and promoted the establishment of new local chapters of the party.

In November 2023, D'Antuono was re-elected as co-president of Volt Europa, alongside Mels Klabbers from Volt Netherlands. During the European elections held during her term as president, the party stood in significantly more countries and improved its result considerably, resulting in the party gaining four additional seats in the European Parliament.. D'Antuono's term as Volt Europa's co-president ended in July 2025.

=== Right to Housing! Now and Forever ECI ===
Since 2026 D'Antuono's main focus shifted to promoting the right to affordable housing at European level. She co-signed the European Citizens' Initiative "Right to Housing! Now and Forever".

== Political positions ==
=== Migration ===
In her statements, she points to the requirement that asylum policies are based on international treaties and respect for human dignity. D'Antuono has strongly criticized both European and Italian asylum and migration policies, advocating for a continent-wide harmonization of asylum procedures, reestablishing an official Search and Rescue system not delegated to NGOs, and increasing EU resources for reception and integration.

In November 2024, D'Antuono visited the asylum seekers’ center in Gjader, Albania, together with MEPs from Volt Europa and a delegation of Italian and Albanian Volt members. Aftherwards she criticised the project promoted by the Giorgia Meloni government and reported that staff are already leaving the facilities again.

=== Economic Inequalities ===
For D’Antuono, reducing inequalities starts with a profound revision of the taxation system. Her goal is to enhance fiscal justice by making taxation genuinely progressive and reducing opportunities for evasion. D’Antuono advocates for accelerating European unity to end the “race to the bottom” that benefits large multinational companies. She proposes tax harmonization, imposing a minimum effective tax rate, creating a European Ministry of Finance to facilitate mandatory automatic information exchange among EU Member States, and implementing a central wealth registry by merging data from national sources. Additional she supports the establishment of a universal European minimum wage as a key measure to reduce poverty and economic disparities. According to D'Antuono, the lack of support for these issues from centre-left parties is, in her view, responsible for the decline in support from working-class voters.

D’Antuono has also been particularly critical of the Meloni government regarding its lack of commitment to fighting poverty and inequalities.

She frequently emphasizes the strong link between social justice and climate justice, highlighting their intrinsic connection.

=== European Democracy ===
D’Antuono advocates for a radical revision of European institutions to develop a true European democracy capable of decisively addressing global challenges. She has also spoken out about the structural rigidity of the Italian political system toward new political entities, especially compared to other European countries like Germany and the Netherlands. She argues that the combination of laws and regulations governing political participation in Italy creates a system favoring personality-driven parties with substantial financial resources.

To address this, D’Antuono supports the proposal for a European electoral law to standardize the regulations for European elections across all EU countries. Under this proposal, citizens would vote not only for their national candidates but also for transnational lists. The plan includes lowering the voting age to 16 and mandating gender alternation in electoral lists.

=== Women's and minority rights ===
D’Antuono is committed to the inclusion and advancement of women in leadership roles and strives for equal political representation. She criticises inequalities in the medical field, such as the fact that less is known about diseases and the effects of medication on the female body, that illnesses are diagnosed less quickly, and that there is a higher risk of misdiagnosis or incorrect treatment by doctors.

She calls for social initiatives to integrate people with disabilities into society from an early age and to reduce factors contributing to discrimination, such as the segregation of people with disabilities in schools or specialised residential facilities, as also advocated by the UN Committee on the Rights of Persons with Disabilities.

In a series of articles, D'Antuono criticises the way racism and hostility towards the LGBTQ community are dealt with in Italy. She calls for society to engage in self-reflection and to take a critical approach to history.

=== Other Topics ===
Regarding the Russian invasion of Ukraine, D’Antuono advocats for strong and clear support for Ukraine and an acceleration of its EU accession process.

On the recent escalation of the Arab-Israeli conflict, D’Antuono has called for an immediate ceasefire, recognized signs of potential genocide in Gaza, and stressed the importance of a united and strong European Union in foreign policy.

== Personal life ==
Under the pseudonym Francesca del Mar, D'Antuono wrote several short stories and two books. In August 2021, she became the mother of a son.
