= Reinier van Lanschot =

Dutch politician (born 1989)

Reinier van Lanschot MEP
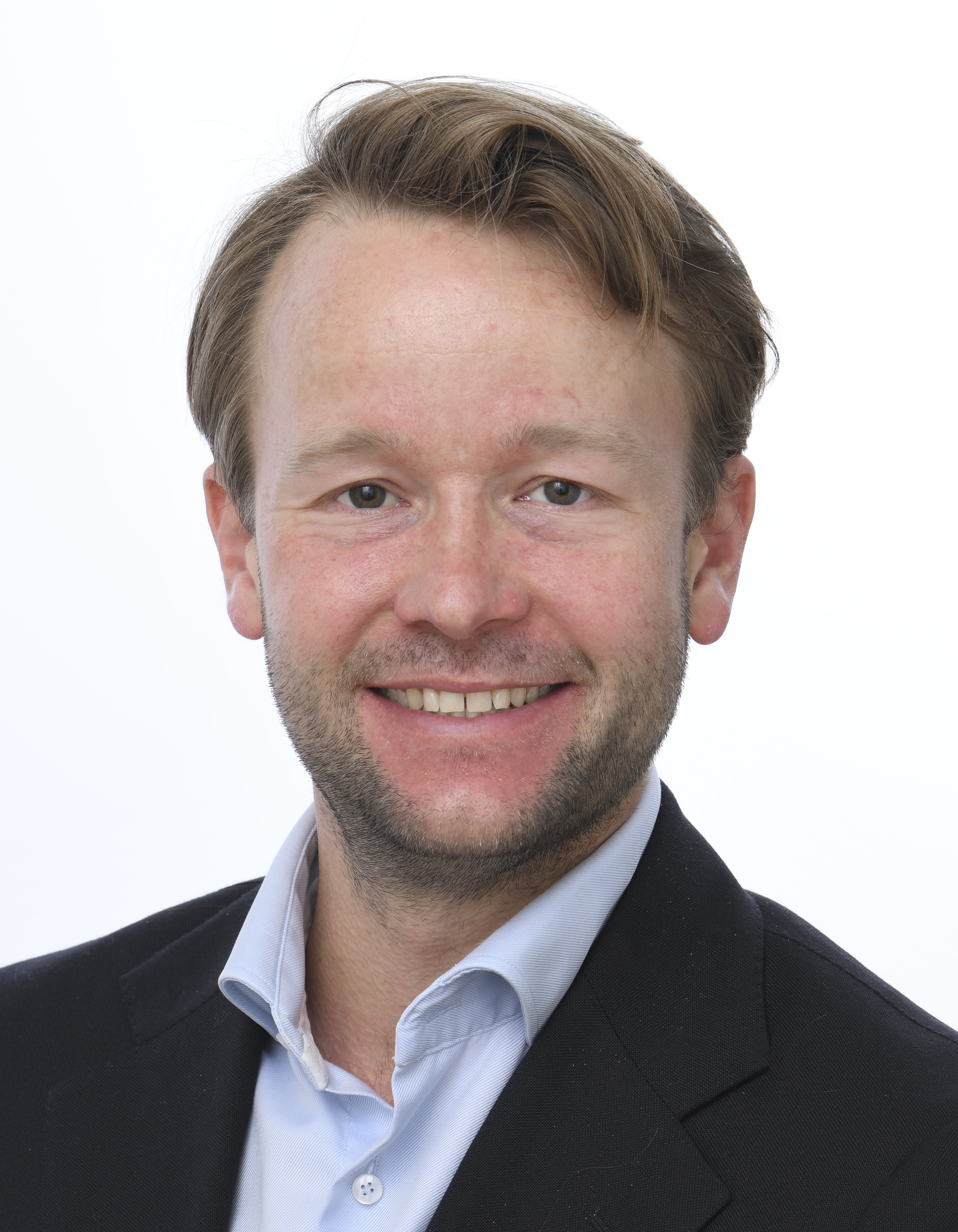

Member of the European Parliament
- Incumbent
- Assumed office 16 July 2024
- Parliamentary group: Greens–European Free Alliance
- Constituency: Netherlands

Co-President of Volt Europa
- In office October 2019 – June 2023

Personal details
- Born: Reinier Joost Alexander van Lanschot; 7 September 1989 (age 37) Saint-Germain-en-Laye, France
- Party: Volt (since 2018); Volt Netherlands
- Education: University of Utrecht; University of Amsterdam

Reinier Joost Alexander van Lanschot (born 7 September 1989) is a Dutch politician and one of two Volt Netherlands Members of the European Parliament (MEPs) alongside Anna Strolenberg. In 2018, he co-founded Volt Netherlands with Laurens Dassen and served as its chairman during the party's first year. He was the party's top candidate for the European Parliament in the 2019 election and again in the 2024 election. Van Lanschot was elected to the co-presidency of Volt Europa (together with Valerie Sternberg of Volt Germany) at the 2019 General Assembly in Sofia, and re-elected for a second mandate (together with Francesca Romana D'Antuono of Volt Italy) at the 2021 Lisbon General Assembly.

== Biography ==
Van Lanschot is descended from the Van Lanschot family and was born in Saint-Germain-en-Laye. He grew up in Haarlem and studied law first at the University of Utrecht (2008 to 2013) and later at the University of Amsterdam (2013 to 2014), where he obtained a Master's degree. After graduating, he first started working for a start-up offering innovative legal services. He then worked for Ahold Delhaize as a manager, managed a supermarket in Lelystad and was responsible for the sale of breakfast products in the retail department of Albert Heijn.

In 2018, van Lanschot was trained as a community organiser at the Harvard Kennedy School. After the foundation of Volt Nederland on June 23, 2018, he quit his job to focus on building up the party as a volunteer. After that he worked for the European Volt association as co-president between 2019-2023.

== Political work ==
=== Volt Nederland ===
Together with a few others, van Lanschot founded the party Volt Nederland, the Dutch section of Volt Europa, in Utrecht on 23 June 2018 and was elected as the party's first leader. In doing so, rising nationalism, climate protection and a lack of humane migration policies motivated him to get involved politically.

In the European Parliament elections on 23 May 2019, he was the top candidate and list leader of the Dutch chapter of Volt. When he was elected list leader, he stepped down as Volt chair in order to balance leadership roles within the party. However, he fell short of entering parliament with 1.9% of the electoral vote. During the campaign, he criticised the lack of leaders in Brussels and a constant focus on national interests instead of common European ones. For the Dutch parliamentary election 2021, Lanschot was elected as a Lijstduwer on position 28 of the list.

He was once again the lead candidate for Volt in the Netherlands in the June 2024 European Parliament elections. The party secured two seats, and Van Lanschot was sworn in on 16 July. He has served on the following European Parliament committees:

- Committee on Constitutional Affairs
- Committee on Foreign Affairs
- Delegation to the EU–Russia Parliamentary Cooperation Committee
- Delegation to the EU–Armenia Parliamentary Partnership Committee
- Delegation to the EU–Azerbaijan Parliamentary Cooperation Committee
- Delegation to the EU–Georgia Parliamentary Association Committee
- Committee on the Internal Market and Consumer Protection (substitute)
- Committee on Security and Defence
- Delegation for relations with the United States (substitute)
- Delegation to the Euronest Parliamentary Assembly (substitute)

=== Volt Europa ===
On 13 October 2019, he was elected co-president of the European federation with Valerie Sternberg-Irvani, which he has led since. Together with Francesca Romana D'Antuono, he was re-elected at the general assembly of Volt Europa in Lisbon.

In a guest article in October 2021, van Lanschot, together with Francesca Romana D'Antuono, advocated the establishment of a permanent EU armed corps that could be deployed quickly and autonomously in crises and criticised the slow decision-making and complicated existing processes.

Van Lanschot stepped down from his position as Volt Europa's co-president in June 2023 to dedicate himself to campaigning for the 2024 European Parliament election.

== Political positions ==
In regards to the European Union (EU), Van Lanschot has declared that he agrees with the views of Eurosceptics but that instead of destroying the EU he wants to improve it by making it more transparent, democratic and social. Van Lanschot claims that Brexit and the recent spike in popularity of Thierry Baudet have strengthened the party. He and his party also believe in the cause of environmentalism.

Van Lanschot shared his vision on how to deal with nature, democracy, migration, economy, digitalization and defense in the 21st century in his book 'We are Europe'. Which also explains his vision for reforming the EU to make Europe functional.

== Appreciation ==
On 19 December 2018, Van Lanschot and Dassen were named "EuroNederlander of the Year" by the European Movement Netherlands.

On 23 January 2019, Van Lanschot was selected as one of Elsevier weekly magazine's "30 under 30" talents.

On 9 April 2024 his 'Wij zijn Europa'(We are Europe) reached the Dutch bestseller list on #17.

On 1 July 2025 he was nominated in the MEP awards as "Best newcomer".

== Personal life ==
Maes van Lanschot, member of the House of Representatives for Christian Democratic Appeal, is his brother.

== Electoral history ==
Electoral history of Reinier van Lanschot
Year	Body	Party	Pos.	Votes	Result		Ref.
Year	Body	Party	Pos.	Votes	Party seats	Individual	Ref.
2024	European Parliament	Volt Netherlands	1	140,073	2	Won	
2019	European Parliament	Volt Netherlands	1	51,621	0		
