= Jan Huitema =

Dutch politician (born 1984)

Jan Huitema MEP
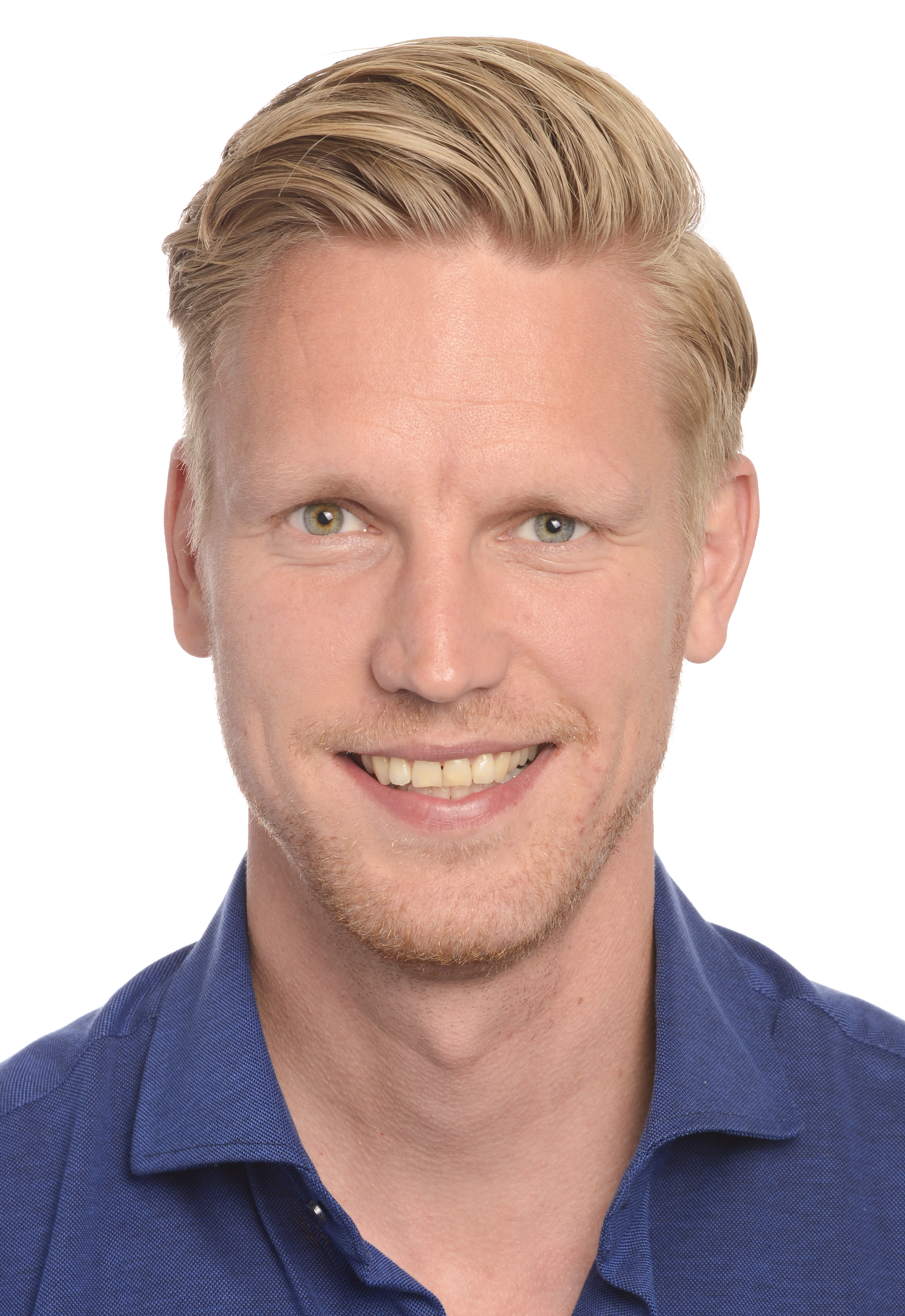

Member of the European Parliament
- In office 1 July 2014 – 15 July 2024
- Constituency: Netherlands

Personal details
- Born: 5 July 1984 (age 42) Heerenveen, Netherlands
- Party: People's Party for Freedom and Democracy
- Other political affiliations: Alliance of Liberals and Democrats for Europe
- Education: Wageningen University

Jan Huitema (born 5 July 1984) is a Dutch politician who served as a Member of the European Parliament (MEP) from 2014 to 2024. He is a member of the People's Party for Freedom and Democracy (VVD), part of Renew Europe in the European Parliament, until 2019 the Alliance of Liberals and Democrats for Europe.

== Early life and education ==
Huitema was born as the son of a farmer in Heerenveen. He went to high school in Sneek. Huitema obtained a bachelor's degree in Animal Sciences at Wageningen University and followed this up with a master's degree in Animal Production Systems at the same university in 2008.

== Career ==
Huitema started working as a policy employee for Dutch member of the European Parliament (MEP) Jan Mulder in 2008 and worked for him until 2009. He worked a further three years in the same position for Holger Krahmer, a German Free Democratic Party MEP. In 2012 he decided to return to the family farm.

Together with his father Huitema owns a dairy farm with 130 cows based in Makkinga. He was placed sixth on the People's Party for Freedom and Democracy's list of candidates for the 2014 European Parliament elections. Huitema stated that while working for MEPs he saw numerous reports, opinions and proposals which looked great in theory but were in practice infeasible, specifically targeting new parts of the Common Agricultural Policy. He campaigned the country by touring with a 1954 Fordson Dexta tractor. His slogan for entering the European Parliament was: "Brussels could use some farmers wisdom".

=== Member of the European Parliament, 2014–2024 ===
Huitema received 25,798 votes and on the basis of those preferential votes he managed to obtain the third place among the People's Party for Freedom and Democracy candidates and was thereby elected. After his election he stated it was his intention to return to the family farm every weekend to see what is going on in the Netherlands as not to lose touch with the country.

During his first term from 2014 until 2019, Huitema was a member of the Committee on Agriculture and Rural Development (AGRI) and the Delegation for relations with Canada. He was the first Dutch MEP in five years on the Committee on Agriculture and Rural Development; on the committee, he has served as rapporteur on fertiliser products and water reuse (2018) as well as on CO_{2} emission performance standards for passenger cars and light commercial vehicles (2021). During his first term Huitema worked on a change in the definition of animal manure and prevention of the patenting of plant-properties. In 2019, Huitema joined the Committee on the Environment, Public Health and Food Safety.

In addition to his committee assignments, Huitema serves as a member of the Parliament's delegation for relations with the United States. He is also part of the European Parliament Intergroup on Biodiversity, Countryside, Hunting and Recreational Fisheries the European Parliament Intergroup on Climate Change, Biodiversity and Sustainable Development, and the European Parliament Intergroup on LGBT Rights.

Huitema was re-elected in the European Parliament elections of 2019. He was not on the ballot in June 2024, and his membership of the body ended on 15 July 2024.

== Political positions ==
In an interview with a Nederlandse Omroep Stichting reporter Huitema stated he would not only represent the interest of farmers, but will also focus on entrepreneurship and regional interests.

As one of the policy problems of the European Union he gave the example of the manure policy which does not take national differences into consideration. In November 2014, Huitema together with fellow Dutch MEP Annie Schreijer-Pierik, was critical of the Natura 2000 policy. They stated that farmers in nature reserves near border regions were especially and unfairly affected by the national implications of the European Natura 2000 policy. Huitema argued for a fundamental discussion on the Natura 2000 policy.

Huitema has argued for the immediate closure of battery cages in the European Union. These have been illegal in the European Union since 2012, but some still exist. Huitema argued that these are damaging the Dutch poultry industry as Dutch farms already have invested in more animal friendly cages.
