= Catharina Rinzema =

Dutch politician (born 1985)

- Rinzema at the European Parliament in Strasbourg

Member of the European Parliament
- In office 18 January 2022 – 15 July 2024
- Preceded by: Liesje Schreinemacher
- Constituency: Netherlands

Personal details
- Born: Henriëtte Catharina Rinzema; 4 July 1985 (age 41) Soest, Netherlands
- Party: People's Party for Freedom and Democracy
- Education: Leiden University

Henriëtte Catharina Rinzema (born 4 July 1985) is a Dutch politician and public affairs adviser from the People's Party for Freedom and Democracy (VVD). She was a Member of the European Parliament from January 2022 to July 2024, sitting with the Renew Europe group. She now works as an adviser at Castro EU.

== Education ==
She studied law at Leiden University from 2004 to 2009 and also completed a bachelor's degree in legal philosophy there between 2006 and 2009. After a year of training at the campaign agency BKB, she took an LLM in political philosophy at Leiden Law School, finishing in 2011 with a thesis on Hannah Arendt. She also did an internship at the Senate.

== Career ==
Rinzema worked at Google's European headquarters from July 2011 to March 2012 and was then a programme manager at the debating centre De Balie in Amsterdam until August 2013. From August 2013 to January 2016 she was a member of the administrative staff of the House of Representatives. She then worked for the literacy foundation Stichting Lezen & Schrijven as project manager for international affairs and diversity (May 2016 to February 2021), and from February 2021 at ABN AMRO's Global Centre of Expertise for Behaviour, Ethics & Compliance Learning.

In May 2016 she joined the board of the VVD's Brussels branch.

== European Parliament ==
=== Candidacy and appointment ===
Rinzema was sixth on the VVD list in the 2019 European Parliament election. The party won four seats, and she was not elected. She received around 15,000 preference votes. She was visibly pregnant during the campaign. Many people admired her for campaigning while expecting a child, but she also received hostile messages, including claims that she would be a bad mother. In a 2023 interview she said that the amount of negativity she drew as a woman with political ambitions showed her that she could make a difference in politics.

When Liesje Schreinemacher became Minister for Foreign Trade and Development Cooperation in the Fourth Rutte cabinet in January 2022, Rinzema was next in line on the list. The central electoral committee declared her elected on 11 January 2022, and she took her seat on 18 January.

=== Committees ===
In Parliament she was a full member of the Committee on International Trade (INTA) and a substitute member of the Committee on the Internal Market and Consumer Protection (IMCO). From January 2023 she was also a substitute on the Committee on Legal Affairs (JURI), and from January to March 2022 a substitute on the Special Committee on Artificial Intelligence in a Digital Age. She sat on the delegation for relations with the United States and the delegation to the EU–UK Parliamentary Partnership Assembly, and was a substitute on the delegation for relations with Japan. She was also vice-chair of the Intergroup on Children's Rights.

=== Legislative work ===
In 2022 Rinzema was rapporteur in the trade committee for an amendment to the decision concluding the European Union–South Korea Free Trade Agreement. The committee approved her recommendation on 14 November 2022 and Parliament gave its consent on 22 November. She was Renew Europe's shadow rapporteur on the regulation on foreign subsidies distorting the internal market, adopted in December 2022 as Regulation (EU) 2022/2560. The law lets the European Commission block takeovers and public tenders involving companies that have received distortive subsidies from non-EU governments. Rinzema, who took part in the negotiations, said the aim was to stop EU companies from being shut out of their own market.

After Brexit she was a shadow rapporteur on the regulation setting out the Union's rights in enforcing the Withdrawal Agreement and the EU–UK Trade and Cooperation Agreement, adopted in March 2023.

=== Children's rights and violence against women ===
Outside her committee work, Rinzema focused on child protection. In March 2022 she backed a campaign, led in Parliament by the Belgian MEP Hilde Vautmans, for an EU-wide ban on so-called paedophile manuals, and arranged for around eighty MEPs to sign a letter on the subject to the European Commission. "It is horrifying to think that instructions to abuse children can be freely distributed on the internet," she said. In a December 2022 opinion piece on the Commission's proposal to combat online child sexual abuse, she wrote that privacy mattered but that children's rights should not be made secondary to it. She was a member of the Interparliamentary Taskforce on Human Trafficking, where she worked on preventing child trafficking and on children's safety online.

In June 2023 she spoke at a protest against femicide on Dam Square in Amsterdam, where 43 pairs of red high-heeled shoes were displayed. She proposed holding the event in Brussels the following year to press EU member states to act, and criticised member states that had not yet brought the Istanbul Convention into their national law.

=== Departure ===
Rinzema did not run for re-election in June 2024, and her term ended on 15 July 2024.

== Later career ==
After leaving Parliament, Rinzema sat on the board of the European Liberal Forum until September 2024. Her membership of the interparliamentary working group on human trafficking, which she had joined in March 2024, lasted until January 2025. From January to April 2025 she was a senior public policy and government relations manager for minor safety at TikTok. In April 2025 she began working on Taalschatten, a language initiative of the Number 5 Foundation, and in June 2025 she became a strategic EU adviser at the public affairs agency Castro EU. In September 2026 she was also appointed a senior adviser at Rasmussen Global.

== Other positions ==
She was a member of the board of the international press centre Nieuwspoort in The Hague from August 2013 to January 2016, of the Netherlands Red Cross branch in The Hague from April 2015 to June 2019, and of the foundation Stichting Nederlanders Buiten Nederland from January 2019 to January 2022.
