= Laurens Dassen =

Party leader of Volt Netherlands

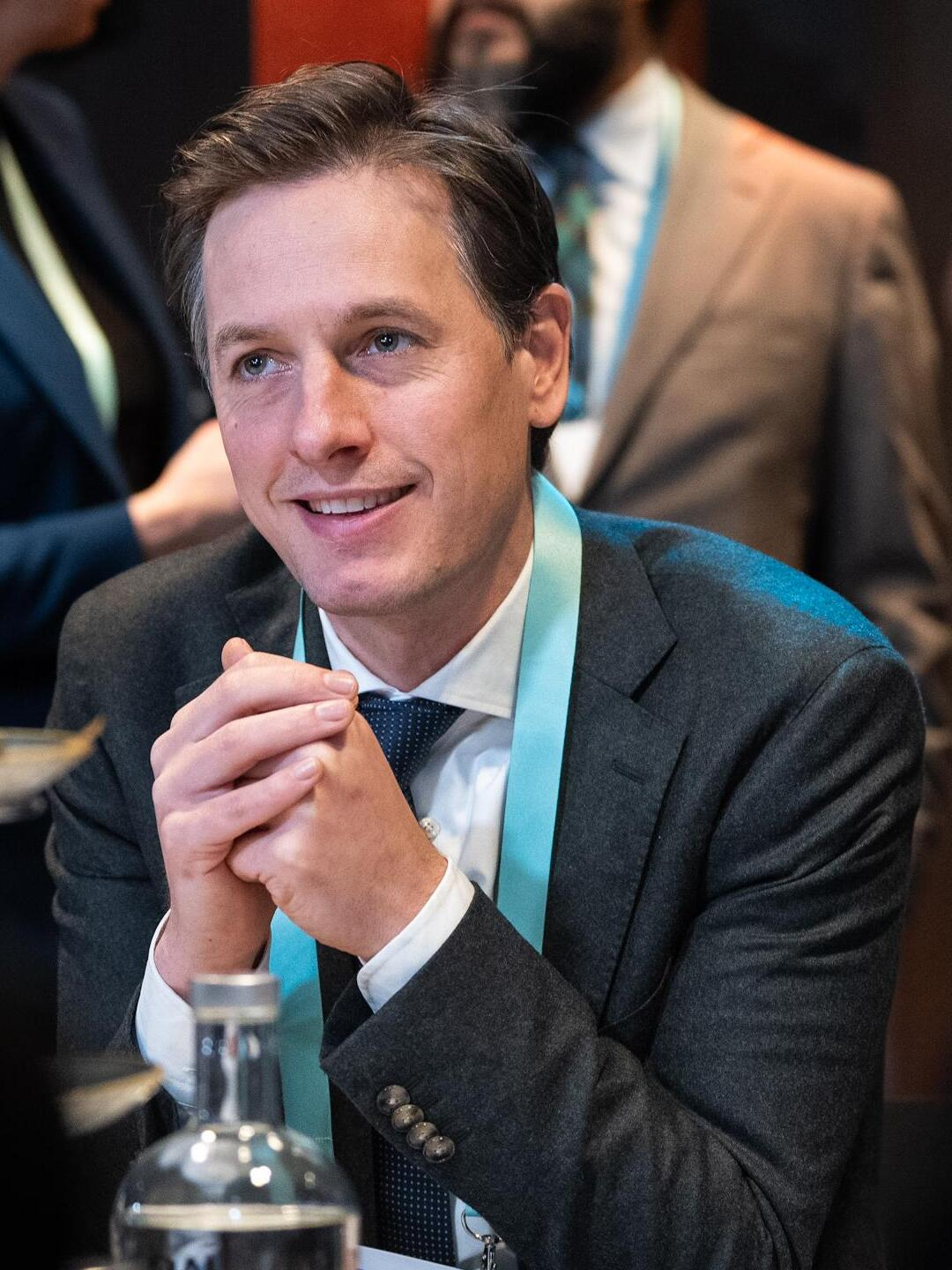
- Dassen in 2025

Leader of Volt Netherlands in the House of Representatives
- Incumbent
- Assumed office 31 March 2021

Member of the House of Representatives
- Incumbent
- Assumed office 31 March 2021

Personal details
- Born: Laurens Antonius Josephus Maria Dassen; 19 October 1985 (age 41) Eindhoven, Netherlands
- Party: Volt Netherlands
- Children: 2
- Education: Radboud University
- Occupation: Banker

Laurens Antonius Josephus Maria Dassen (born 19 October 1985) is a Dutch politician and former banker. Dassen grew up in Knegsel, studied business administration at Radboud University and worked for ABN AMRO for six years. He has been a member of Volt Netherlands since its foundation in 2018 and was elected to the House of Representatives as his party's lijsttrekker in the 2021 general election.

== Early life and career ==
Dassen was born in 1985 in Eindhoven and grew up in the nearby village Knegsel, North Brabant. His father worked as a manager for Philips, and his mother was a primary school teacher. Dassen has an older sister and a younger brother, and he attended the Veldhoven secondary school Sondervick College, earning his havo diploma in 2003. In his youth, he played football at the Knegselse Boys, and he played the baritone horn in a youth orchestra.

After finishing secondary school, Dassen went to the Eindhoven Fontys University of Applied Sciences but quit after a year to study international economics at Maastricht University. In 2005, when he had not passed enough first-year courses, he switched to Radboud University in Nijmegen, where he graduated in 2011 with a degree in business administration. While a student, Dassen was a member of the student association N.S.V. Carolus Magnus, interned at an IT company in India for half a year, and participated in the 2009 edition of Harvard Model United Nations as part of the United Netherlands delegation.

In 2012, following his graduation, Dassen took a job at ABN AMRO. He was initially involved in risk management and in the prevention of money laundering and terrorism financing, and he was posted to Dubai for five months. Dassen later worked on web and app development at the bank. He left his job in September 2018 but returned part-time for a few months in 2020.

== Politics ==
Dassen's transition to political life was caused by a variety of factors, including increased nationalism and populism, Brexit and the election of Donald Trump as President of the United States. Unable to find an established political party that fit him, he joined Volt Europa, who were seeking to form a Dutch wing, in February 2018 and became a volunteer. Dassen was one of the people who founded Volt Netherlands on 23 June 2018 and started serving as its treasurer. He quit his job at ABN AMRO in September to focus on politics full-time and also became Volt's secretary. Dassen succeeded Reinier van Lanschot as party chair on 15 December 2018, when Van Lanschot was chosen as the party's lijsttrekker for the 2019 European Parliament election. Dassen himself was listed third on the Volt Netherlands party list. The party received 1.93% of the vote, not enough to meet the threshold for a seat in the European Parliament.

=== House of Representatives ===
On 6 June 2020, Dassen was chosen as Volt's top candidate for the 2021 Dutch general election. The Volt campaign focused on European, cross-border solutions for climate change, migration, security, and social inequality. Dassen rejected attempts to place him on the left–right political spectrum, dismissing it as "old politics". Volt won three seats in the election, resulting in Dassen being sworn in as member of the House of Representatives on 31 March. He stated that his party, being a newcomer, was not open to joining a new governing coalition. During 2022 budget debates, a motion by Volt and coalition party D66 was carried by the House to appropriate €100 million to provide lunches in school.

Dassen made various proposals in his first term to lower corruption and raise trust in the Dutch political system. In September 2021, Dassen and fellow members of parliament successfully called through a motion, which was adopted by the House, for a two-year period during which cabinet members could not fill a lobbying position following the end of their term. It was in reaction to recommendations by GRECO and to Minister Cora van Nieuwenhuizen stepping down to work as an energy lobbyist. Dassen launched a plan with independent politician Pieter Omtzigt in May 2022 to combat corruption among cabinet members and other high-ranking government officials. Their proposal included the expansion of the integrity rules, the introduction of a code of conduct and an authority that enforces it, and the creation of a lobby register that includes meetings. A motion to introduce the register was carried, but Minister of the Interior and Kingdom Relations Hanke Bruins Slot refused to execute it. De Volkskrant reported that some of the other proposals of Omtzigt and Dassen were used by Minister Bruins Slot in her bill for a two-year lobbying ban for former cabinet members. The sanctions they had suggested in case of breaching the rules, however, were not included. Furthermore, Dassen suggested together with Gert-Jan Segers (CU) that trust in the Dutch political system should be increase by strengthening the House's ability to gather information and by raising the number of seats in the House from 150 to 200. Dassen presented a policy paper on political reform with Segers's successor – Mirjam Bikker – in August 2023. It contained three plans: to increase the size of the House from 150 to 250 seats, to involve the parliament earlier in bills initiated by the cabinet, and to organize more debates on long-term issues such as the effects of artificial intelligence (AI). Dassen argued the responsibilities of members of parliament had grown, partly due to social media.

During Dassen's tenure as caucus leader, the party suspended House member Nilüfer Gündoğan from its caucus following allegations of unacceptable behavior. When she was definitively expelled in February 2022 after an investigation, Gündoğan filed a criminal complaint for defamation against Dassen, Volt, and the accusers. A judge determined that the expulsion had been unjust, and Dassen subsequently apologized to Gündoğan but later stated that the conflict could only be resolved after the withdrawal of her criminal complaint. Her expulsion was finally reinstated in March following a vote by the caucus, in which Dassen supported the move calling their relationship "permanently broken". The conflict caused Dassen's approval rating among Volt voters to drop from 96% to 74% according to a poll by EenVandaag and Ipsos. An appellate court ruled in 2023 that the expulsion had been correct, reversing the lower court's decision.

When the collapse of the fourth Rutte cabinet triggered a snap election for November 2023, Dassen indicated his intention to become lead candidate once again. Volt's board nominated him for the post and the party's members affirmed the decision with 98% in support. At the party conference, Dassen said radical choices are necessary to mitigate climate change and to reform the Dutch tax system. He advocated for replacing all government benefits by a limited basic income that would later be expanded to a true universal basic income. He also campaigned on a cancellation of debts by the government for those struggling with problematic debts. Volt received two House seats, and Dassen was re-elected.

==== Committee memberships ====
- Committee for Defense
- Committee for Digital Affairs
- Committee for Economic Affairs and Climate Policy
- Committee for Education, Culture and Science
- Committee for European Affairs
- Committee for Finance
- Committee for Foreign Affairs
- Committee for Health, Welfare and Sport
- Committee for Infrastructure and Water Management
- Committee for the Interior
- Committee for Social Affairs and Employment
- Contact Group France
- Contact Group Germany
- Procedure Committee
- Public Expenditure Committee

== Personal life ==
Following his studies in Nijmegen, Dassen lived in Rotterdam before moving to Amsterdam, when he became a web and app developer at ABN AMRO. He left Amsterdam after eleven years in favor of The Hague in September 2021, while a member of parliament. He met his girlfriend Britte while studying. Their son was born in 2023, and their second child was born the year after.

== Electoral history ==
Electoral history of Laurens Dassen
Year	Body	Party	Pos.	Votes	Result		Ref.
Year	Body	Party	Pos.	Votes	Party seats	Individual	Ref.
2021	House of Representatives	Volt Netherlands	1	135,272	3	Won	
2023	House of Representatives	Volt Netherlands	1	97,999	2	Won	
2025	House of Representatives	Volt Netherlands	1	55,089	1	Won	
