= Nilüfer Gündoğan =

Turkish-Dutch politician (born 1977)

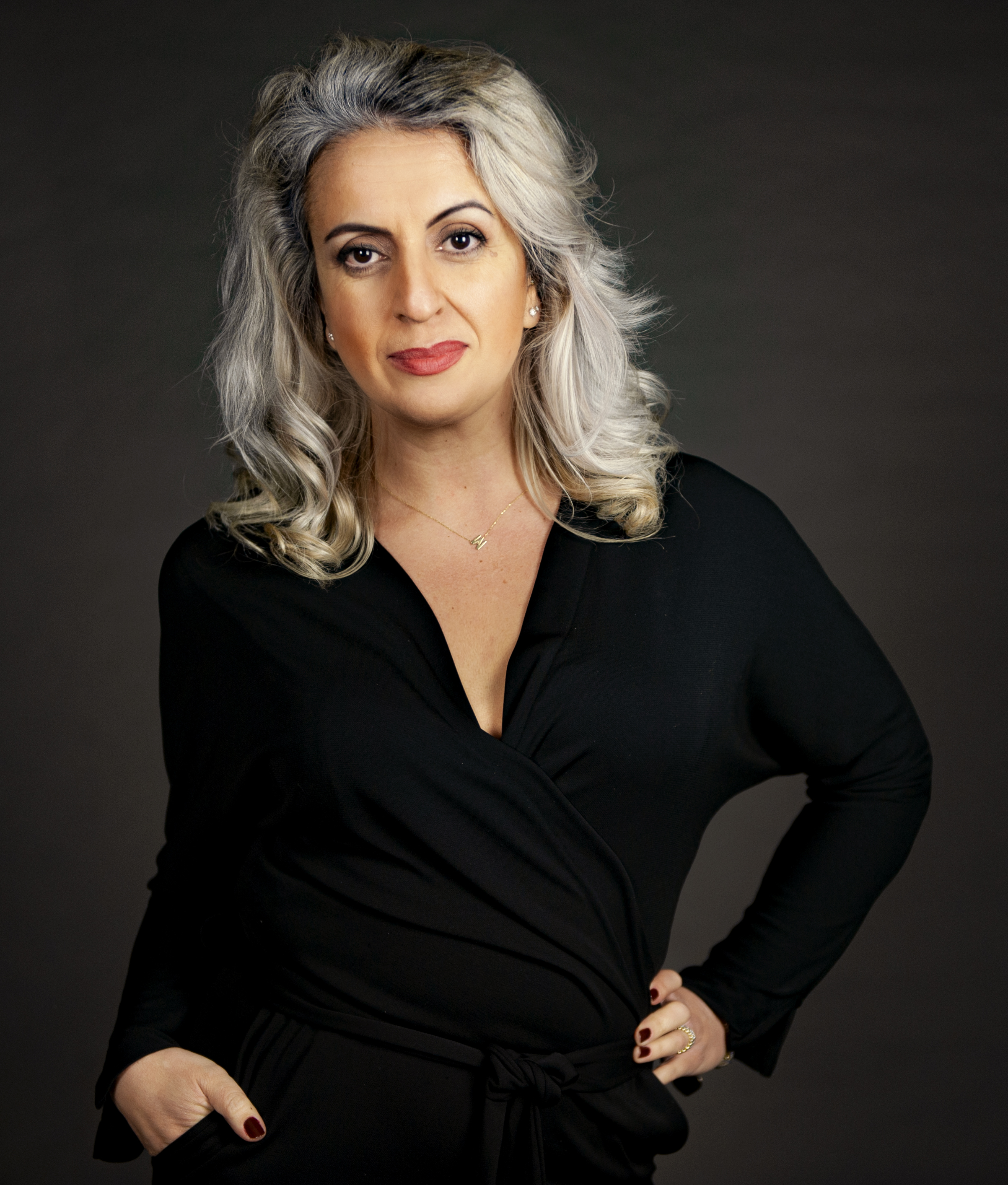
- Gündoğan in 2021

Member of the House of Representatives
- In office 31 March 2021 – 5 December 2023

Personal details
- Born: Nilüfer Gündoğan; 6 June 1977 (age 49) Nazımiye, Tunceli, Turkey
- Party: Independent (since 2022)
- Other political affiliations: Democrats 66 (2009–2018); Volt Netherlands (2018–2022)
- Spouse: Bas Vogels (m. 2015; died 2017)
- Children: 1

Nilüfer Gündoğan (Dutch: [ˈnilyfɛr ˈɡʏndoːɦɑn], Turkish: [nilyˈfæɾ ˈɟyndoan]; born 6 June 1977) is a Dutch politician, who was a member of the House of Representatives. She was elected to the House in the 2021 general election on behalf of Volt Netherlands. Gündoğan had before worked as a consultant and manager.

In February 2022, she was suspended from Volt's parliamentary group following internal allegations of physical violence, unwanted sexual advances, intimidation, and abuse of her position -- allegations she has denied. Since the end of her political career, Gündoğan returned to consulting.

== Early life and career ==
Gündoğan was born on 6 June 1977 in Nazımiye, Tunceli Province, Turkey, into an Alevi family, belonging to the Zazas. She has a brother and a sister. Her father had been a teacher in Turkey and had moved to the Netherlands as a guest worker to work in a factory. When Gündoğan was 18 months old and when her father had been in the Netherlands for five years, her family moved to the Netherlands, and she grew up in the city of Weert, Limburg. There, she attended the secondary school Philips van Horne at vwo level.

She moved in 1996 to Amsterdam to study medicine, but she quit in 2003 without a degree. According to Gündoğan, this was caused by her violent father. She has told that she was hospitalized in September 2001 after her father had attempted to kill her and that she subsequently fell into a depression. In the years 2005–07, she studied political science at Leiden University, but she again did not graduate. Gündoğan worked simultaneously project assistant for the municipality of Amsterdam. She held the position of strategic renewal project manager at the municipality between 2009 and 2012. Gündoğan later worked as a consultant, account manager, and interim manager at several other organizations including Rainman Group and jb Lorenz. When she was elected to the House, she also owned her own consultancy called Nilüfer Advies.

== Political career ==
Gündoğan identifies as a social liberal and joined the political party Democrats 66 (D66) in 2009. She participated in its development program Route66 for two years and served on the board of Amsterdam's D66 wing between late 2011 and 2013. Gündoğan wanted to become D66's lijsttrekker in Amsterdam-Zuid for the 2014 elections but lost to Sebastiaan Capel.

Over the years, she became disappointed with some aspects of D66, and she joined Volt in 2018, the year its Dutch branch was founded. Gündoğan stands for a liberal democracy and society and has warned against tampering with liberal democratic principles in the Netherlands. She has been vocal in her support for the European Union to tackle cross-border issues, including the migrant crisis, climate change, digital security, and liberal democracy. Gündoğan was the second candidate of Volt Netherlands in the 2019 European Parliament elections. The party received 1.93% of the vote, not enough to meet the threshold for a seat in the European Parliament.

=== House of Representatives ===
In the 2021 Dutch general election, Gündoğan was again placed second on Volt's party list. She had been a candidate to be the party's lijsttrekker, but this position had gone to Laurens Dassen instead in June 2020. Gündoğan received 41,352 preference votes in the election and her party won three seats. She was installed into the House of Representatives on 31 March. She is on the Procedure Committee and on the Committees for Defence; for Education, Culture and Science; for Finance; and for Public Expenditure. In June 2021, Gündoğan filed a motion to prohibit tobacco lobbying, but it came seven votes short of passing the House. Another proposal of her was a new tax on profit made from the sale of a house, similar to an existing one in France, in order to address rising housing prices by combatting speculation.

She wrote a letter to Speaker Vera Bergkamp with Sjoerd Sjoerdsma (D66), in which they called for a discussion with the House's presidium to address threatening comments made by House members of Forum for Democracy (FVD) during debates. One of the incidents they referred to occurred in 2021 when Gündoğan had complained about intimidating emails by DENK and FVD supporters. House member Gideon van Meijeren had subsequently said that he was very proud that his supporters were going all out to change her mind about the government's response to the COVID-19 pandemic. Gündoğan continued to speak out against extreme language and threats on social media, and she filed a police report following death threats. She mostly blamed right-wing populist politicians, calling Geert Wilders a "nasty racist" on Twitter. She apologized for a tweet in which she said she would inject Thierry Baudet everyday if there would have been a vaccine against fascism. After Gideon van Meijeren declared in a July 2022 speech that farmers could sometimes be justified in using violence during the period of farmers' protests, Gündoğan announced that she would file a criminal complaint for sedition and inciting violence.

=== Expulsion from Volt ===
A number of internal complaints about unacceptable behavior by Gündoğan led Volt to suspend her from their parliamentary group on 13 February 2022 awaiting the results of an external investigation. The episode occurred during a wave of allegations of inappropriate behavior against high-profile people in the Netherlands. Gündoğan said that she was unaware of the nature of the complaints. In a statement two days later, she called her suspension disproportionate, and she declared that she would keep her House seat regardless of the outcome of the investigation. She also said that she would be sorry if her working style had made anyone feel unsafe. Her lawyers announced on 18 February that Gündoğan would take legal action against Volt's parliamentary group in order to end her suspension, to get a rectification, and to receive damages. The party stated, in turn, that she was unwilling to cooperate with the external investigation, which Gündoğan had described as not independent. Volt decided to permanently expel Gündoğan from its parliamentary group on 26 February as a result of 13 allegations from fellow party members of physical violence, unwanted sexual advances, intimidation, and abuse of her position. That same day, Gündoğan filed a criminal complaint for defamation against Volt's board, party leader Laurens Dassen, and the accusers. A judge determined on 9 March that the expulsion had been unjust, as procedures had not been followed correctly and as there had been no proper justification, and ordered its immediate reversal as well as €5,000 in damages. Dassen also apologized to Gündoğan in reaction. The proceedings made clear that three complaints concerned sexual advances and another three concerned slaps on the butt, while the others were related to verbal assault and excessive alcohol usage. Gündoğan denied having crossed any boundaries with her behavior.

Newspaper NRC Handelsblad published an article on 13 March outlining several instances of Gündoğan's alleged unacceptable behavior after having spoken with five of the accusers. It included anger outbursts, drunken behavior, and asking for sex as well as a slap on the butt of a female minor, which was described by the victim as intimidation. Gündoğan dismissed the allegations, calling them a smear campaign and calling their level painfully low. Days after the article's publication, Dassen and Volt's board made clear that reconciliation could only be achieved if Gündoğan would withdraw her criminal complaints. She instead told on talk show Jinek that she had expanded them. Volt subsequently announced that it would appeal the judge's decision, and Gündoğan was again expelled from the party's parliamentary group on 22 March following a vote among its three members after the by-laws had been altered to allow for this. Furthermore, Volt's board decided to end her membership of the party on 28 March. Gündoğan returned to the House of Representatives on 10 May as the leader of her own parliamentary group – Lid Gündoğan (Member Gündoğan) – after nearly three months of absence, bringing the number of groups in the House to a record-breaking twenty. She told that the focus of her work would be on finances, democracy, and the rule of law. The Public Prosecution Service dismissed Gündoğan's criminal complaints for defamation a few months later. An Amsterdam appellate court reversed the lower court's earlier decision on 7 February 2023, ruling that Volt had been justified in expelling Gündoğan from their parliamentary group. However, it did conclude that Volt's original press release about Gündoğan's alleged unacceptable behavior had been a little premature and sometimes formulated in an unfortunate way. Volt published a report of its own about the affair in May, but it did not draw any conclusions or provide concrete examples of unacceptable behavior.

=== 2023 general election ===
The fall of the fourth Rutte cabinet in July 2023 triggered a November snap election. Gündoğan announced she would not run for re-election, saying she did not have enough time to establish a new party.

== Personal life ==
Gündoğan has been living in Amsterdam since 1996. She was married to Bas Vogels, whom she knew from D66. Bas was diagnosed with incurable colorectal cancer months after their relationship had started in January 2014. They married in 2015 in France, and Nilüfer subsequently bore the last name Vogels. Bas was voluntarily euthanized in March 2017, about half a year after the birth of their son Mikail. Gündoğan raises her son as a single parent. She is an atheist.
