= Volt Netherlands =

Political party in the Netherlands

Volt Netherlands Volt Nederland
- Abbreviation: Volt
- Leader: Laurens Dassen
- Chairperson: Denise Filippo; Rob Keijsers
- Leader in the Senate: Gaby Perin-Gopie
- Leader in the House of Representatives: Laurens Dassen
- Founder: Reinier van Lanschot; Laurens Dassen
- Founded: 23 June 2018; 7 years ago
- Membership (2026): ▲19,004
- Ideology: Social liberalism European federalism Pro-Europeanism; Progressivism
- Political position: Centre-left
- European Parliament group: Greens/EFA
- European political alliance: Volt Europa
- Colours: Violet
- Senate: 2 / 75
- House of Representatives: 1 / 150
- Provincial councils: 11 / 572
- Municipal councils: 25 / 8,863
- European Parliament: 2 / 31

Website
- voltnederland.org

Volt Netherlands (Dutch: Volt Nederland, commonly abbreviated to Volt) is a political party in the Netherlands. It is the Dutch chapter of Volt Europa, a political movement that operates on a European level.

== History ==
Volt Netherlands was founded in Utrecht on 23 June 2018, with Reinier van Lanschot as its inaugural chairman. The party owes its start and establishment partly to donations through crowdfunding.

The 2019 European Parliament election was the first election in which Volt took part. The party obtained 106,004 votes in the Netherlands, more than 100,000 votes too few for a seat. The party received most of its votes in university cities, such as Amsterdam, Leiden, Utrecht, and Wageningen. Although the Dutch chapter of Volt was unable to win a seat in the European Parliament, it was represented by Volt Germany, which obtained one seat.

In 2021, the party participated in the Dutch general election. On 25 October 2020, the party adopted its candidate list, with Laurens Dassen as the lead candidate. In early 2021, the Electoral Council announced that Volt Netherlands would participate in all 20 electoral districts. (Note: The Dutch House of Representatives is elected from a single, nationwide constituency. The districts have an administrative function. For more information, see Elections in the Netherlands § Assigning people to seats) National opinion polling typically excluded the party until six weeks before the election, when its popularity increased; a number of polls in the days leading up to election day projected Volt Netherlands to win up to three seats. Volt ultimately won 2.4% of votes, its best national performance in any election to date, and three seats, marking the party's first entrance into a national legislature. The three seats of Volt were filled by Laurens Dassen, Nilüfer Gündoğan, and Marieke Koekkoek. The latter was elected because of individual preference votes.

In February 2022, Gündoğan was expelled from the parliamentary group and suspended from the party after thirteen party members had accused her of undesirable behavior. She filed charges of libel and defamation against Volt, Dassen, and her accusers, and challenged the expulsion in civil court. The court reinstated her, ruling that Volt had not followed proper procedure. Dassen apologized. Volt subsequently appealed the verdict, Dassen and Koekkoek (Note: A majority in the three-seat group, Gündogan was not present.) changed its parliamentary rules and Gündoğan was expelled from both the party and the parliamentary group. She did not relinquish her seat and sat as an independent until the snap election of November 2023, in which she did not contest.

For the local elections of 2022, 25 local chapters of the party had registered. However, according to party statements, Volt Netherlands had failed to achieve gender-equal lists of candidates in some municipalities and was therefore contesting in fewer places than planned.

Following the 2023 Senate election, the party entered the Senate with two seats, having received an additional seat after dissident GroenLinks elector Debora Fernald cast a vote for Volt. Sophie in 't Veld, a member of the European Parliament for D66, announced on 16 June 2023 that she had left her party and joined Volt. On 7 April 2024, she was elected as the European lead candidate for Volt Europa together with Damian Boeselager.

Volt Netherlands maintained two seats in the general election of 2023, down from the three seats it had won in 2021. The party entered the European Parliament after winning two seats in the 2024 European Parliament election. In the general election of 2025, Volt won only one seat and Koekkoek did not return as a member of parliament.

== Policies ==
=== Europe ===
Volt wants to strengthen and reform the European Union and sees the solution to many challenges in closer European cooperation. Among other things, the party wants to abolish the right of veto in the European Council to make it more capable of acting and give the European Parliament a right of initiative. EU subsidies should be linked to the principles of sustainability and the protection of the rule of law. Volt also wants to end the regular relocations of the EU Parliament due to its double seat.

Volt's declared goal is a federal United Europe. To achieve this, the party wants a European constitution, government and prime minister.

=== Climate ===
Volt wants the European Union to become climate-neutral by 2040. To this end, the party wants to promote renewable energies, nuclear energy and circular agriculture. It also wants to ban short-haul flights, expand public transport and invest in a European rail network, abolish subsidies for fossil fuels and close polluting factories until they become more sustainable, ban manufacturers from destroying unused clothing and electronics.

=== Economy ===
The party wants to use the rebuilding of the economy after the COVID-19 pandemic to make the economy more environmentally friendly and put people's well-being at the centre. To this end, more investment is to be made in hydrogen, artificial intelligence and the reuse of materials with a view to a circular economy. A common European minimum tax is to be introduced for large companies and tax avoidance is to be stopped. Volt wants to simplify cross-border work.

=== Digital policy ===
The party advocates the establishment of a Ministry of Digitalisation to enable efficient digital government and to promote digitalisation, which Volt believes has been overslept.

The party sees immense opportunities in AI systems, but at the same time emphasises that these should not be blindly left to the free market. The party is in favour of an ethical AI policy at national, European and international level. Among other things, Volt proposes providing every citizen with their own AI chatbot based on open source and reliable data. AI systems should be labelled as safe by an independent party and school children should receive a basic AI education including programming and ethics. Volt also wants to oblige AI providers to disclose data sources and emphasises the need for transparency.

=== Governance ===
The party is in favour of mayors being directly elected. Citizen participation should be encouraged by promoting citizens' forums and local budgets for citizens to have a direct say in how they are spent. The voting behaviour of MPs is to be made more transparent by making all votes publicly accessible.

Volt wants to expand the House of Representatives from 150 to 250 members and lower the voting age to 16.

=== Transport ===
The party wants to ban short-haul flights and instead wants to expand public transport and invest in a European network of high-speed trains.

=== Security ===
Volt supports the creation of a European army.

=== Migration and asylum policy ===
Migrants and asylum seekers should be distributed throughout Europe according to a distribution key.

=== Social policy ===
Volt is in favour of the introduction of an unconditional basic income.

== Electoral results ==
=== House of Representatives ===
Election	Lead candidate	List	Votes	%	Seats	+/–	Government
2021	Laurens Dassen	List	252,480	2.42	3 / 150	New	Opposition
2023	Laurens Dassen	List	178,802	1.71	2 / 150	▼1	Opposition
2025	Laurens Dassen	List	116,468	1.10	1 / 150	▼1	Opposition

=== Senate ===
Election	List	Votes	%	Seats	+/–	Government
2023	List	4,826	2.70	2 / 75	New	Opposition

=== European Parliament ===
Election	List	Votes	%	Seats	+/–	EP Group
2019	List	106,004	1.93	0 / 26	New	–
2024	List	319,483	5.13	2 / 31	▲2	Greens/EFA

== Relationships to other parties ==
As a relatively new political party in the Netherlands, Volt has no established pattern of coalition preferences. As of 2024, the only municipality where Volt is part of the governing coalition is Arnhem, where it collaborates with GroenLinks, D66, Arnhem Centraal, Partij voor de Dieren, and PvdA. This coalition has been described by some in the media as "extreme left.".

Volt Netherlands does not run an independent list for the water board elections. Instead, like GroenLinks and D66, it recommends that its voters support Water Natuurlijk, an independent, green-oriented political party focused solely on water board elections.
