= Malik Azmani =

Dutch politician (born 1976)

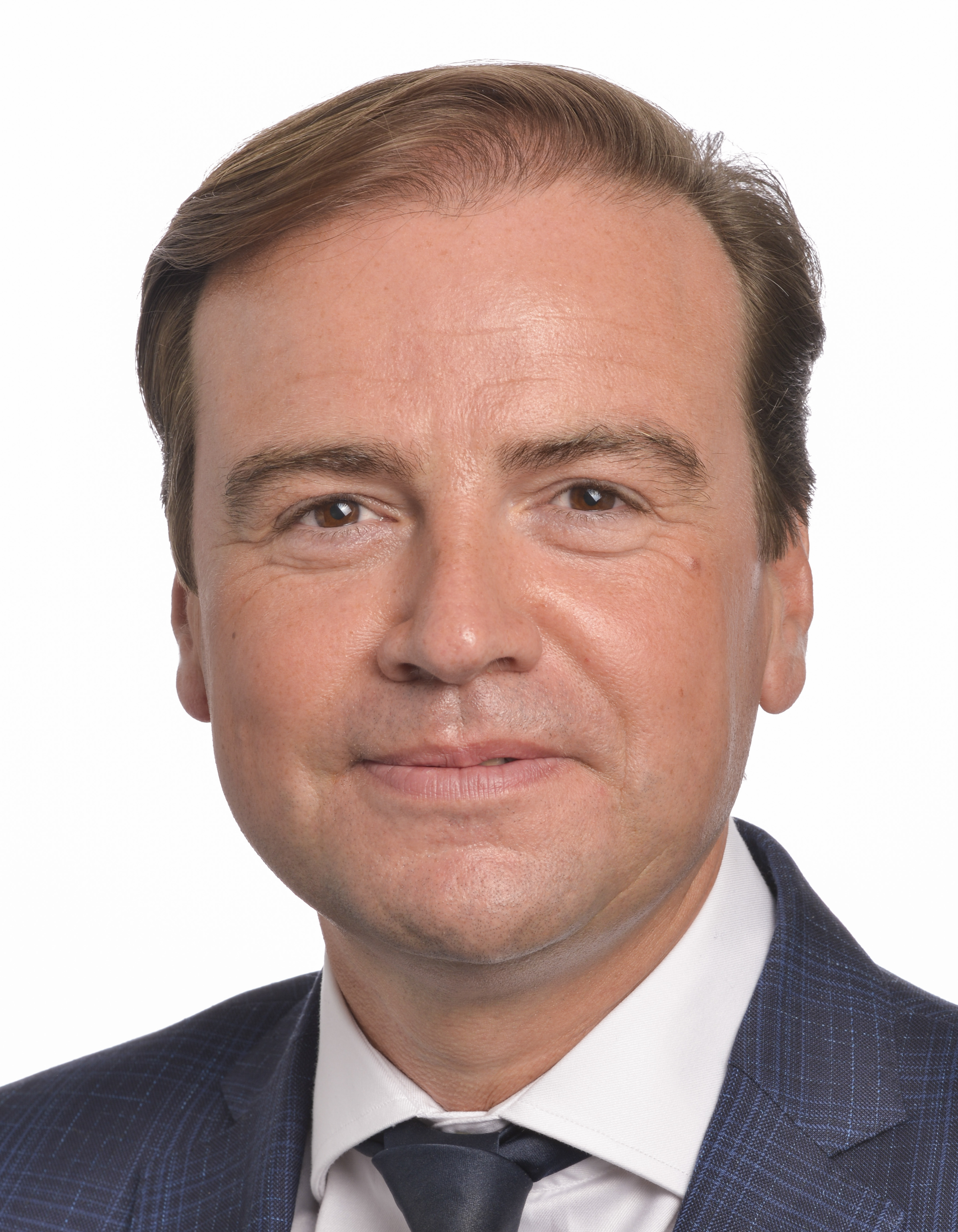

First Vice-President of Renew Europe
- In office 2 July 2019 – 15 July 2024
- President: Dacian Cioloș; Stéphane Séjourné; Valérie Hayer
- Preceded by: Position established
- Succeeded by: Billy Kelleher

Member of the European Parliament
- Incumbent
- Assumed office 2 July 2019
- Constituency: Netherlands

Member of the House of Representatives
- In office 17 June 2010 – 7 June 2019

Personal details
- Born: 20 January 1976 (age 50) Heerenveen, Netherlands
- Party: Dutch: People's Party for Freedom and Democracy; EU: Renew Europe
- Education: University of Groningen

Malik Azmani (born 20 January 1976) is a Dutch politician and former lawyer and civil servant. A member of the People's Party for Freedom and Democracy (VVD), which he led in the 2019 European Parliament election, he has served as a Member of the European Parliament (MEP) since then. Azmani was first elected to the House of Representatives in 2010.

== Early life and career ==
A native of Heerenveen, Azmani is of Moroccan descent through his father and of Frisian descent through his mother. Before making a career at the Immigration and Naturalisation Service (IND), he studied law at the University of Groningen.

== Political career ==
=== Career in national politics, 2010–2019 ===
As a member of the People's Party for Freedom and Democracy, Azmani was a member of the House of Representatives from 2010 until 2019. He was also a member of the municipal council of Ommen from 2010 until 2014. In his political work, he primarily focused on migration and asylum, human trafficking and prostitution, as well as the Intelligence and Security Services Act (Wiv). Furthermore, from 2014 until August 2018, Azmani chaired the Committee on European Affairs in the House of Representatives.

In addition to his role in parliament, Azmani served as member of the Dutch delegation to the Parliamentary Assembly of the Council of Europe from 2013 until 2016.

=== Member of the European Parliament, 2019–present ===
In October 2018, Azmani was (unopposed) elected as the official leading candidate for the VVD in the European Parliament elections.

Following the elections, Azmani was part of a cross-party working group in charge of drafting the European Parliament's four-year work program on rule of law, borders and migration.

In parliament, Azmani has since been serving as deputy chairman of the Renew Europe group, initially under the leadership of chairman Dacian Cioloș. He is also a member of the Committee on Civil Liberties, Justice and Home Affairs and a substitute member of the Committee on Foreign Affairs. In 2021, he joined the parliament's working group on Frontex, led by Roberta Metsola. Since 2021, Azmani has been part of the Parliament's delegation to the Conference on the Future of Europe.

In addition to his committee assignments, Azmani is part of the Parliament's delegations for relations with the Maghreb countries and the Arab Maghreb Union as well as to the Parliamentary Assembly of the Union for the Mediterranean. He is also a member of the European Parliament Intergroup on LGBT Rights.

As deputy leader of Renew Europe, Azmani took over leadership of the group for two weeks in January 2024 when Stéphane Séjourné stepped down from the European Parliament to serve as Minister for Europe and Foreign Affairs in France. Azmani decided to not apply for the permanent chairmanship. Newspaper Trouw reported that his potential candidacy was controversial due to the VVD's willingness to negotiate with the right-wing populist Party for Freedom as part of the 2023–2024 cabinet formation. He was re-elected in June 2024 as the VVD's lead candidate, when the party won four seats. Azmani was succeeded as deputy leader by Billy Kelleher, but he remained part of Renew Europe's bureau. He has also served as vice president of the ALDE Party, and his focus in the parliament is on justice, security, migration, and foreign affairs.

Azmani became the lead negotiator on the controversial Returns Regulation, a proposal to allow European Member States to send failed asylum seekers to be processed in third countries outside of the European Union without the explicit consent of the returnees. The proposal was built on previous unsuccessful attempts to establish 'return hubs' such as the United Kingdom's Rwanda asylum plan and a previous agreement between Italy and Albania. The negotiations saw one of the first times the political centre in the European Parliament openly negotiated with the extreme right wing, breaking a long-standing tradition of the cordon sanitaire.

== Electoral history ==
Electoral history of Malik Azmani
Year	Body	Party	Pos.	Votes	Result		Ref.
Year	Body	Party	Pos.	Votes	Party seats	Individual	Ref.
2024	European Parliament	VVD	1	351,733	4	Won	

== Sources ==
- (in Dutch) Biography, parlement.com. Accessed 29 June 2023.
