= 2019 European Parliament election in the Netherlands =

- 23 May 2019

26 Netherlands seats in the European Parliament
- Turnout: 41.93%
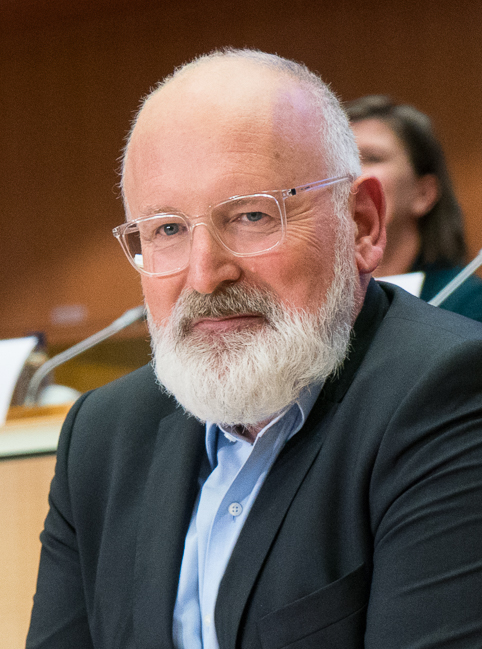

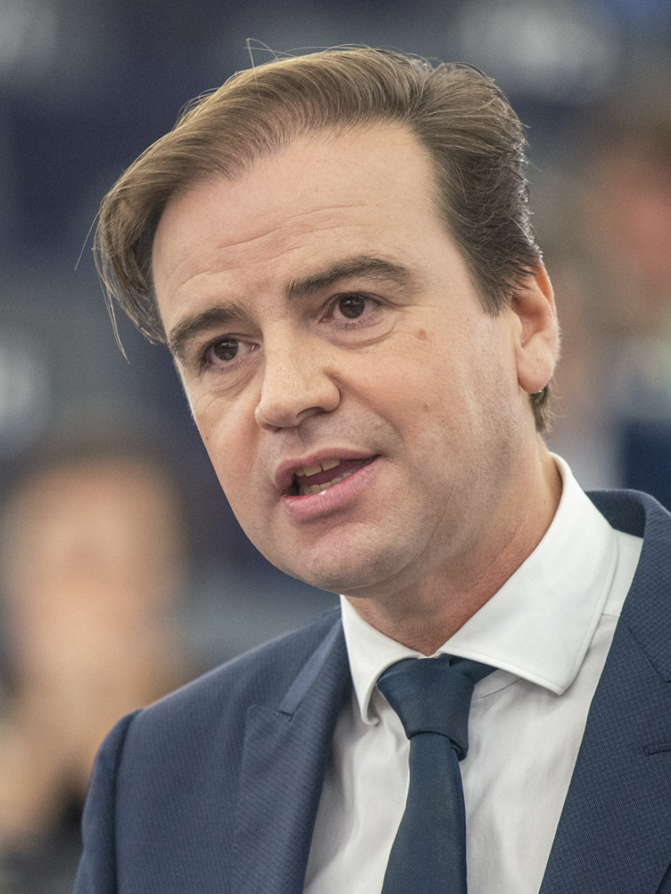

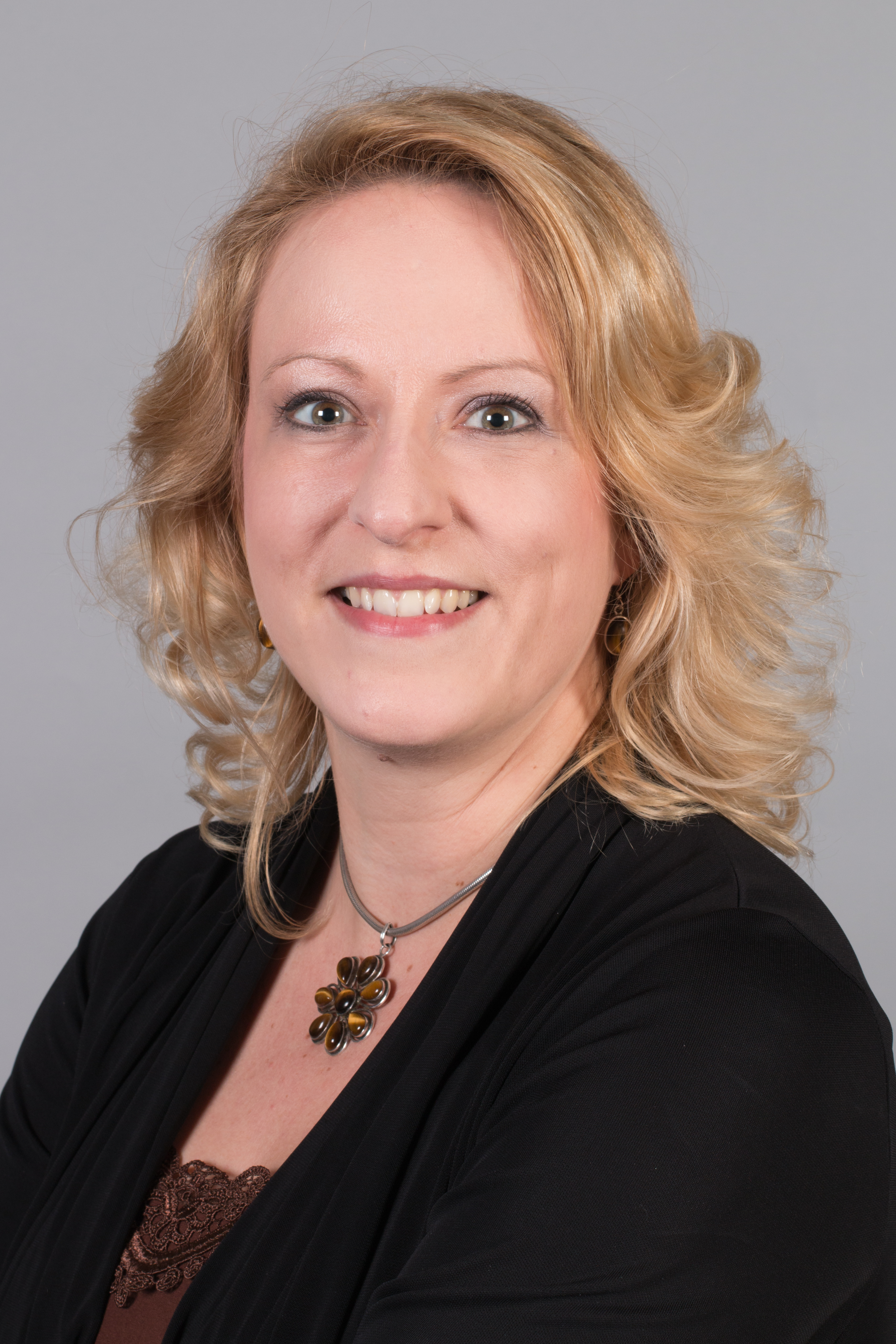

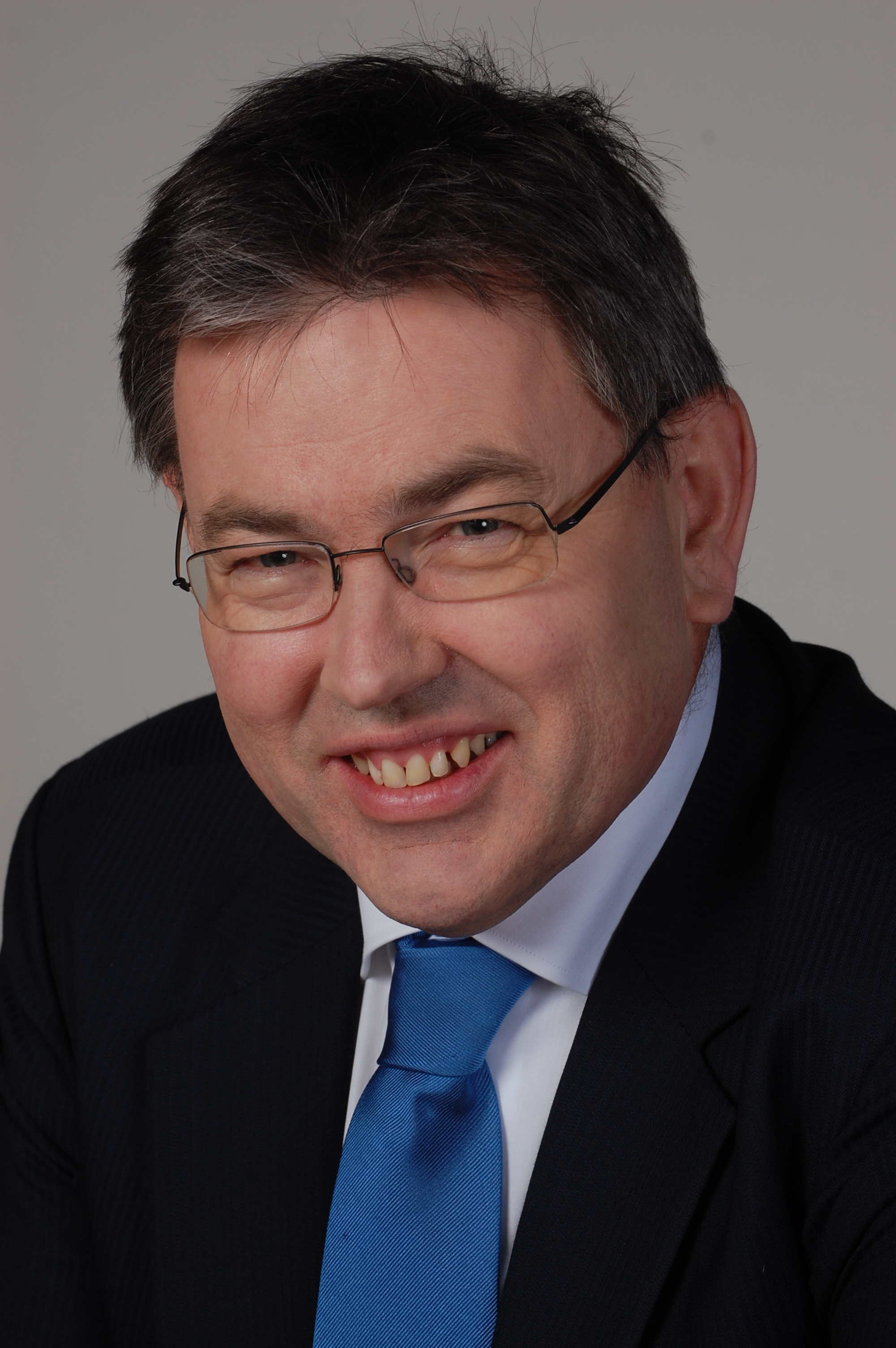

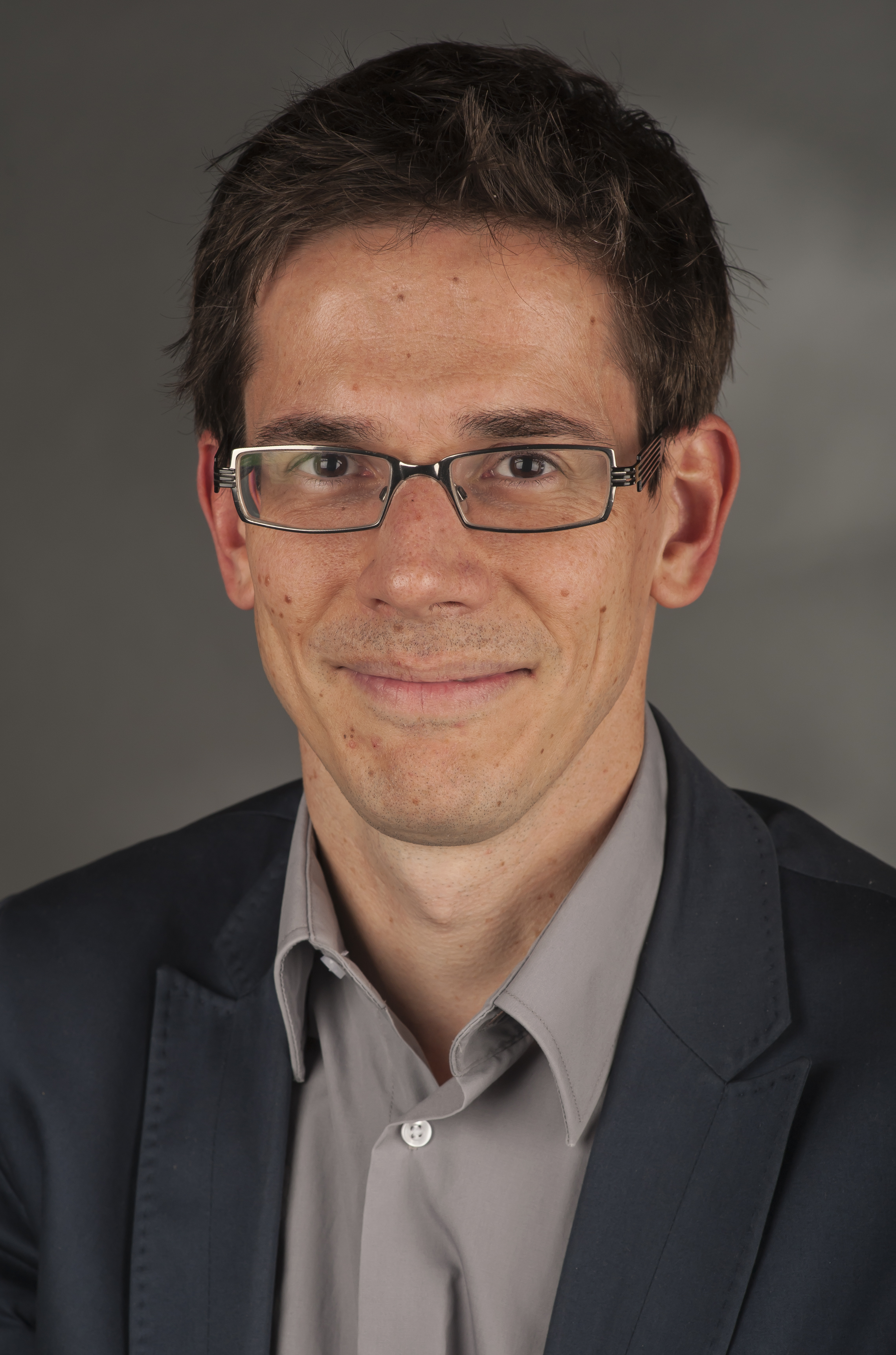

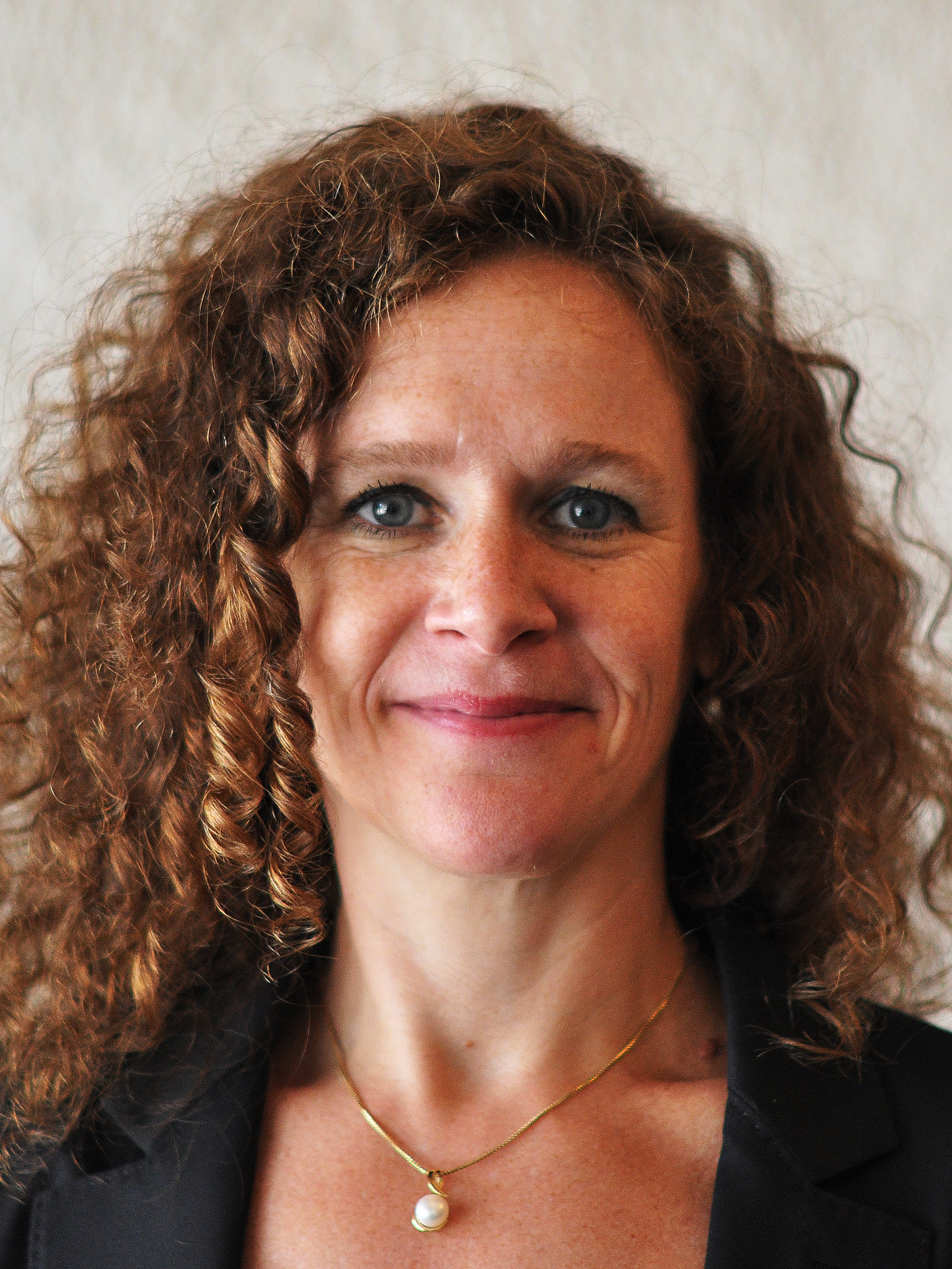

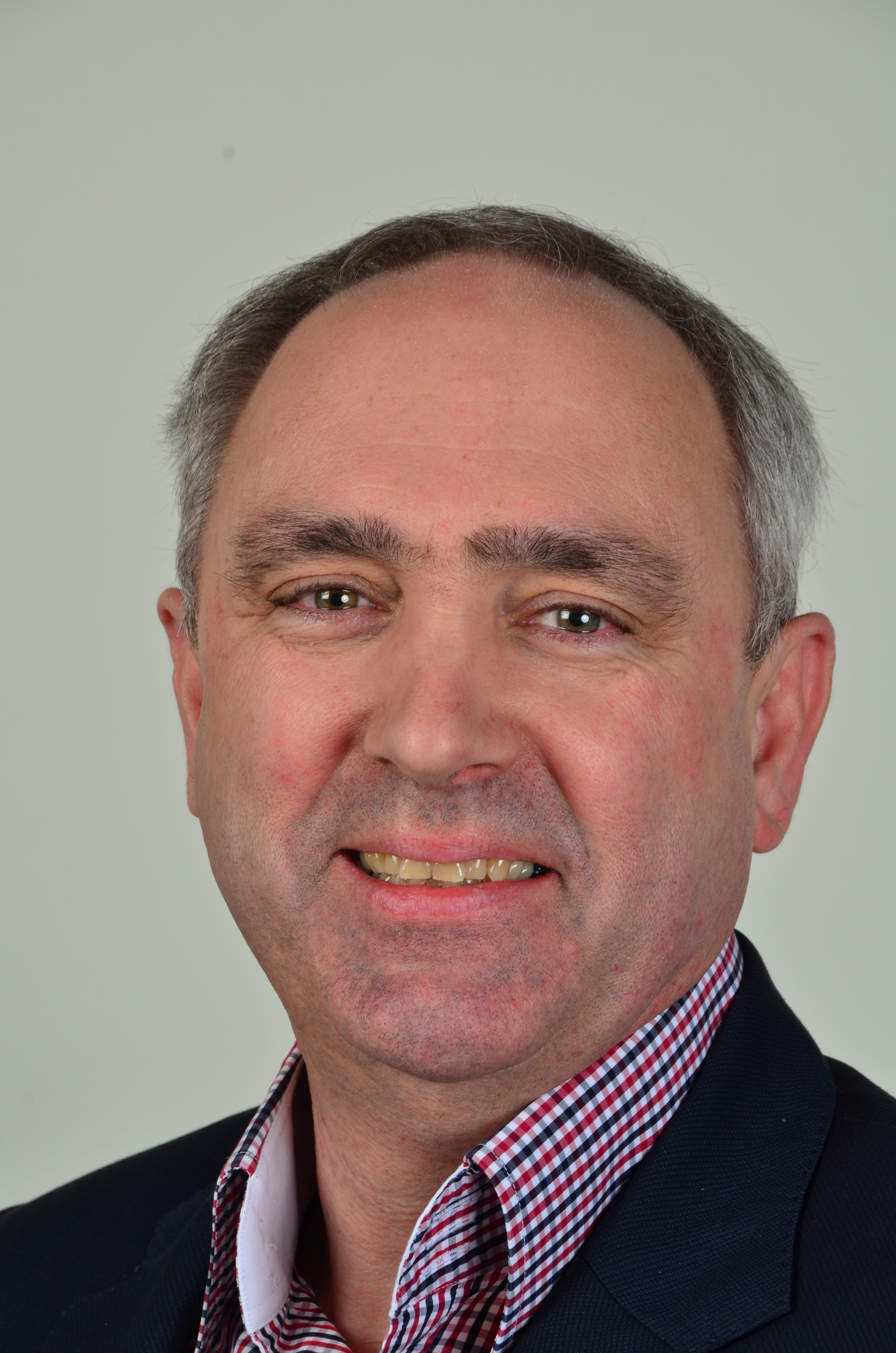

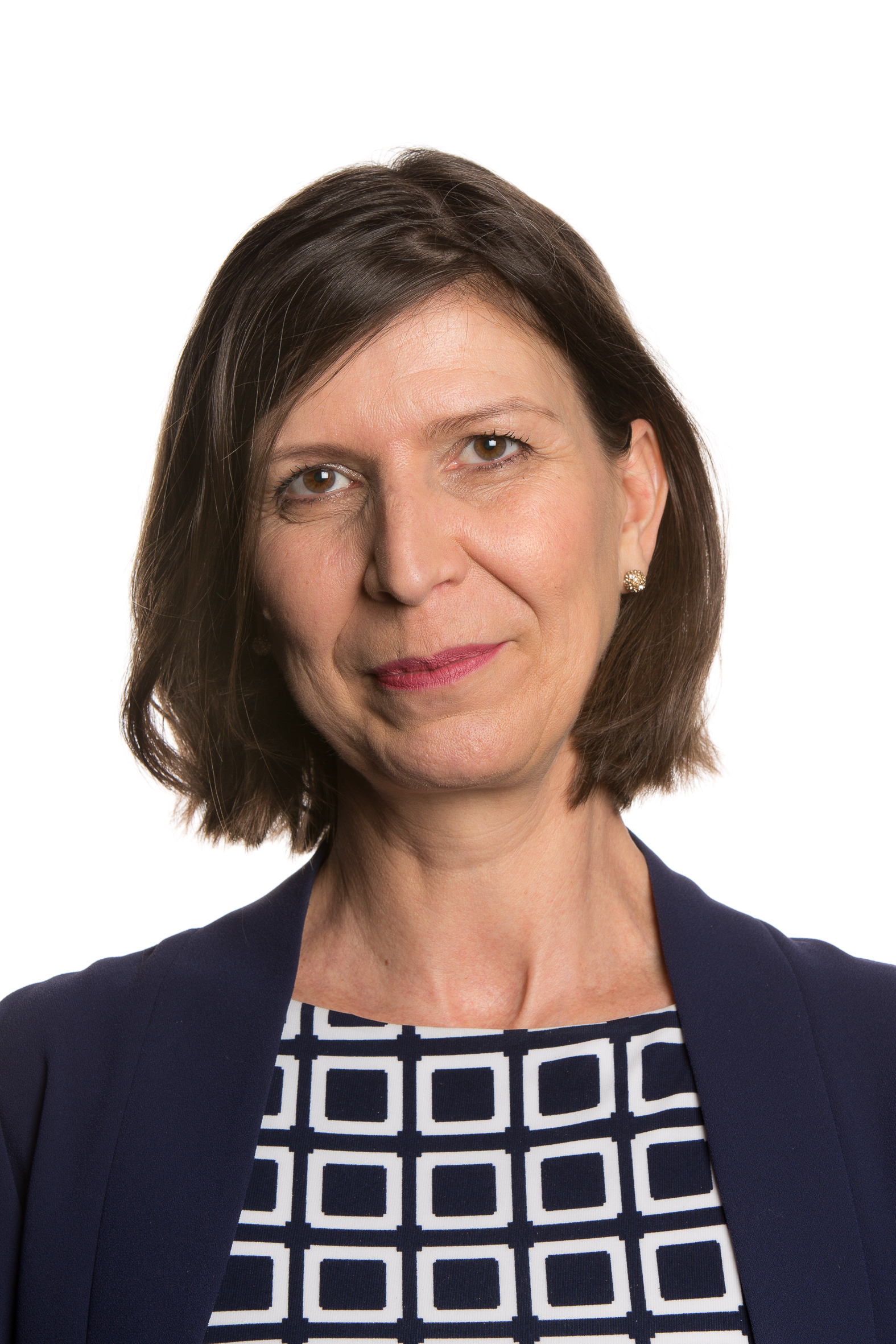

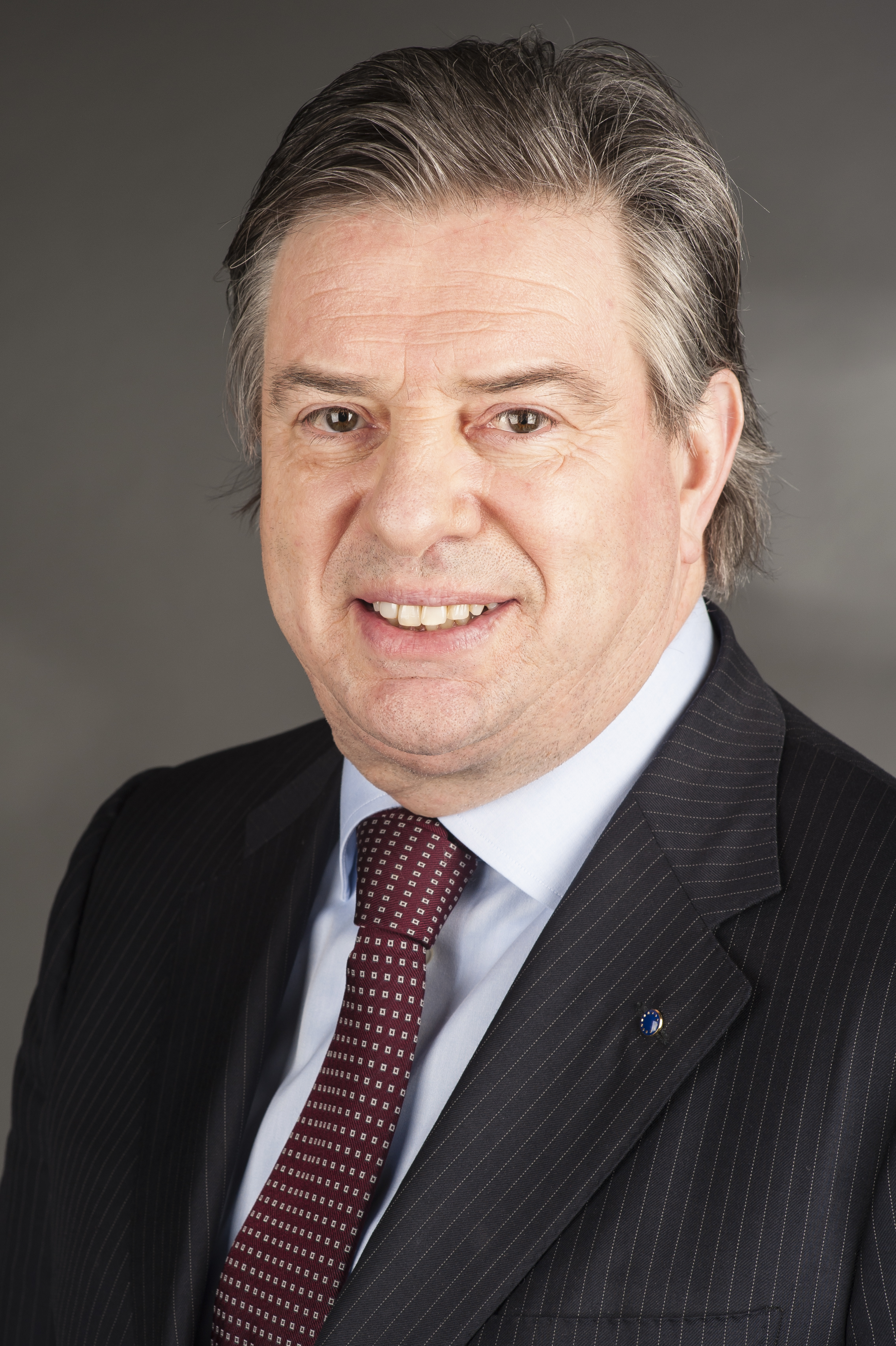
| | First party | Second party | Third party |
|---|---|---|---|
| Leader | Frans Timmermans | Malik Azmani | Esther de Lange |
| Party | PvdA | VVD | CDA |
| Alliance | S&D | RE | EPP |
| Last election | 9.40%, 3 seats | 12.02%, 3 seats | 15.18%, 5 seats |
| Seats won | 6 | 4 | 4 |
| Seat change | ▲3 | ▲1 | ▼1 |
| Popular vote | 1,045,274 | 805,100 | 669,555 |
| Percentage | 19.01% | 14.64% | 12.18% |
| Swing | ▲9.61 | ▲2.62 | ▼3.00 |
| | Fourth party | Fifth party | Sixth party |
| Leader | Derk Jan Eppink | Bas Eickhout | Sophie in 't Veld |
| Party | FvD | GL | D66 |
| Alliance | ECR | Greens-EFA | RE |
| Last election | New | 6.98%, 2 seats | 15.48%, 4 seats |
| Seats won | 3 | 3 | 2 |
| Seat change | New | ▲1 | ▼2 |
| Popular vote | 602,507 | 599,283 | 389,692 |
| Percentage | 10.96% | 10.90% | 7.09% |
| Swing | New | ▲3.92 | ▼8.39 |
| | Seventh party | Eighth party | Ninth party |
| Leader | Peter van Dalen | Anja Hazekamp | Toine Manders |
| Party | CU–SGP | PvdD | 50+ |
| Alliance | EPP / ECR | EUL/NGL | EPP |
| Last election | 7.67%, 2 seats | 4.21%, 1 seats | 3.69%, 0 seats |
| Seats won | 2 | 1 | 1 |
| Seat change | Steady | Steady | ▲1 |
| Popular vote | 375,660 | 220,938 | 215,199 |
| Percentage | 6.83% | 4.02% | 3.91% |
| Swing | ▼0.84 | ▼0.19 | ▲0.22 |

An election of the Members of the European Parliament from the Netherlands was held on 23 May 2019. It was the ninth time such an election had been held in the Netherlands. The number of Dutch seats had been set to increase from 26 to 29 following Brexit, but due to the extension of the Article 50 process in the United Kingdom, the number of seats to be elected remained at 26.

== Background ==
=== Voting and election organisation ===
==== Election planning ====
| Date | Requirement |
|---|---|
| 26 February 2019 | Last day for registering political parties names |
| 9 April 2019 | Candidate lists presented to the Electoral Council |
| 23 May 2019 | European Election in the Netherlands |
| 4 June 2019 | Official results released by the Electoral Council |
| 2 July 2019 | 9th European Parliament session begins (2019–2024) |

==== Right to vote ====
In order to vote, a person must:

- have either the Dutch nationality or the nationality of a European Union member state,
- be 18 years or older, and
- not be otherwise disqualified from voting.

Additionally, nationals of other member states of the European Union must:

- be resident in the Netherlands on the day the candidates are nominated,
- not be disqualified from voting either in the Netherlands or in the Member State in which they are a national, and
- have registered in a municipality declaring that they want to vote in the Netherlands instead of in the home country (by filling out the Y-32 form).

Dutch nationals abroad, as well as in Aruba, Curaçao and Sint Maarten have to register to vote for the elections to the European Parliament. When they register, they must say whether they will vote by post, by proxy, or in person at a polling station in the Netherlands.

Dutch nationals living in another EU member state must make a statement that they have not voted in the member state in which they reside, if they want to vote in the Netherlands.

Dutch residents on Bonaire, St. Eustatius, and Saba have no need to register, because these islands are part of the Netherlands. They are able to vote in person at polling stations on the islands.

==== Right to stand as a candidate ====
In order to stand in the European Parliament election, a candidate must:

- hold either Dutch nationality or the nationality of a Member State of the European Union,
- be at least 18 years of age on the day they would be sworn into the European Parliament, and
- have the right to vote.

Additionally, candidates from other member states of the European Union must:

- be resident in the Netherlands, and
- be able to stand as a candidate in the member state of which they are a national.

==== Organisation of elections ====
In elections for the European Parliament, the national electoral districts play no role in the nomination. The Netherlands consists of a single electoral district. Political parties, therefore, take part in the elections with only a single candidate list.

However, the national electoral districts do play an important role in processing the election results. The principal polling station of each constituency determines the vote total of the constituency. The results of the vote are recorded in an official document and transferred to the Electoral Council. The Electoral Council, in its role as the central electoral committee, then determines the result of the Netherlands' distribution of seats.

==== Casting a vote ====
A voter could cast their vote at a polling station of their choice within their own district. At the casting their vote, they could identify themselves with an identity document which is considered valid even if it has expired within the last five years.

==== Numbering of the candidates list ====
The parties which had obtained one or more seats in 2014 at the last election to the European Parliament were given a number based on the number of votes they had received in the previous election. These totalled nine candidate lists. The party with the most votes got number 1 and the rest were listed accordingly. The list numbers for the remaining candidate lists were decided by a lottery.

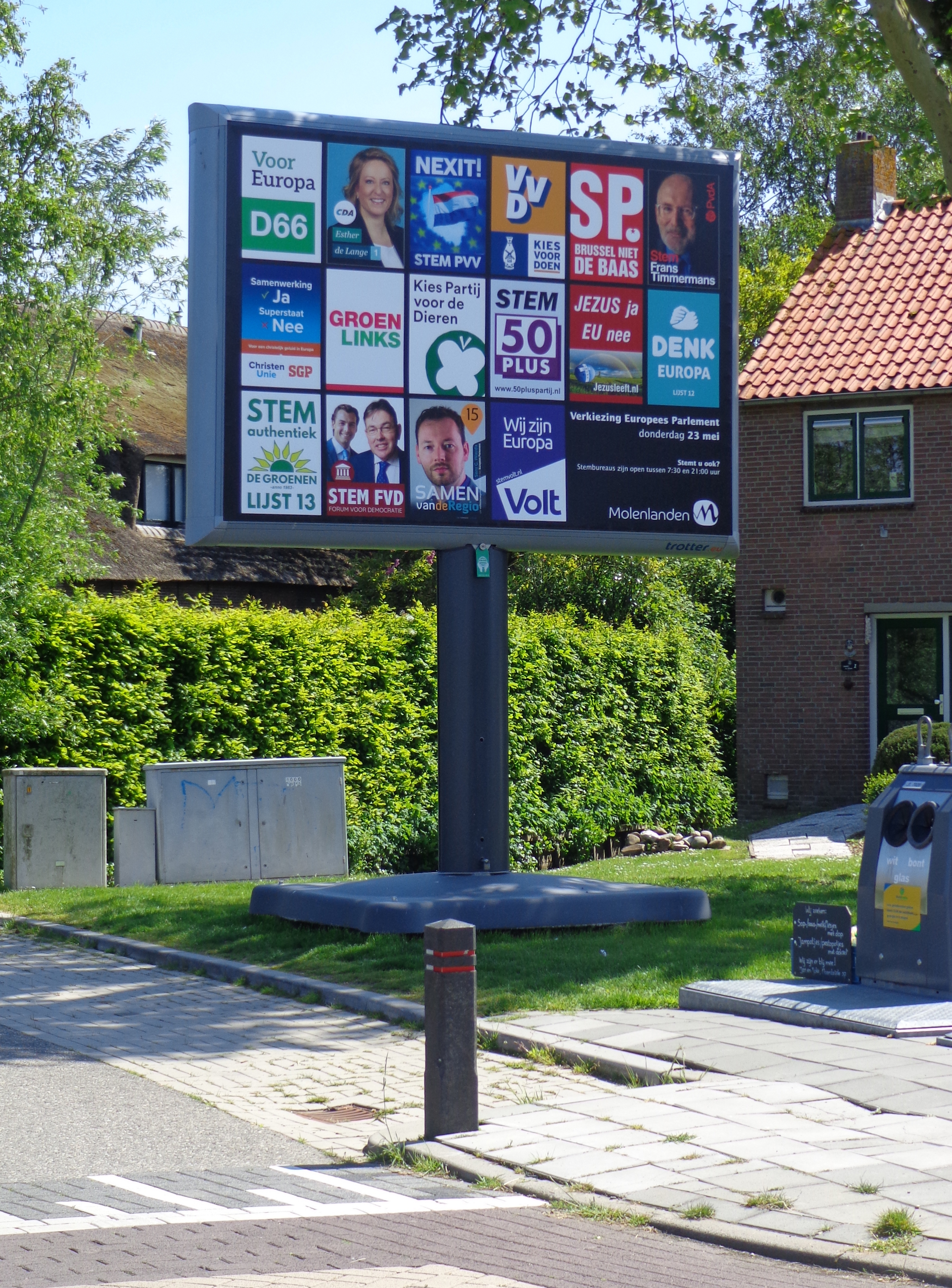

Candidate lists for the 2019 European Parliament election in the Netherlands
| List | | English translation | List name (Dutch) |
|---|---|---|---|
| 1 | list | Democrats 66 (D66) | Democraten 66 (D66) |
| 2 | list | CDA - European People's Party | CDA - Europese Volkspartij |
| 3 | list | PVV (Party for Freedom) | PVV (Partij voor de Vrijheid) |
| 4 | list | VVD | VVD |
| 5 | list | SP (Socialist Party) | SP (Socialistische Partij) |
| 6 | list | P.v.d.A./European Social Democrats | P.v.d.A./Europese Sociaaldemocraten |
| 7 | list | Christian Union-SGP | ChristenUnie–SGP |
| 8 | list | GreenLeft | GROENLINKS |
| 9 | list | Party for the Animals | Partij voor de Dieren |
| 10 | list | 50PLUS | 50PLUS |
| 11 | list | Jesus Lives | Jezus Leeft |
| 12 | list | DENK | DENK |
| 13 | list | The Greens | De Groenen |
| 14 | list | Forum for Democracy | Forum voor Democratie |
| 15 | list | Of the Region & Pirate Party | vandeRegio & Piratenpartij |
| 16 | list | Volt Netherlands | Volt Nederland |

==== Common lists ====
Parties can form common lists, which means that two or more parties create a single list and stand in the elections as though they were one party. There are two for this election:

| Common list | Parties |
|---|---|
| Christian Union-SGP | Christian Union |
| Christian Union-SGP | Reformed Political Party |
| From the Region & Pirate Party | Pirate Party |
| From the Region & Pirate Party | From the Region Party |

==== Election day ====
Traditionally, all elections are held on Wednesday in the Netherlands. However, the European Parliament elections run from Thursday to Sunday across the entire European Union so Thursday was chosen. This is because it is the only day that the Dutch Government believes is appropriate for an election day due to it not being a rest day for any religion. Sunday is not an option because it is a rest day for Christians, while it is the Sabbath on Friday and Saturday.

== Polls ==
=== Exit Poll ===
An exit poll carried out by Ipsos, as well as a forecast of the result produced by GeenPeil and Maurice de Hond based on a part of results collected, indicated that the Labour Party (PvdA) emerged with the most seats, followed by the Christian Democratic Appeal (CDA) and People's Party for Freedom and Democracy (VVD) with four seats each, Forum for Democracy (FvD) and GroenLinks (GL) with three seats and the Democrats 66 (D66) and the Christian Union – Reformed Political Party (CU-SGP) lists with two seats each, with all others on zero or one seat. The result marked the first time the Labour Party had won the most seats of the EU Parliament in the Netherlands since 1984, and the first time it has won the popular vote in a Dutch election since 1998.

=== Poll ===
==== Seats ====
| Polling firm | Date(s) | D66 | CDA | PVV | VVD | SP | PvdA | CU SGP | GL | PvdD | 50+ | DENK | FVD | Volt | Others | Lead | Ref |
|---|---|---|---|---|---|---|---|---|---|---|---|---|---|---|---|---|---|
| 2019 election | 23 May 2019 | 2 | 4 | 0 | 4 | 0 | 6 | 2 | 3 | 1 | 1 | 0 | 3 | 0 | 0 | 2 | |
| Ipsos | 20–21 May 2019 | 2 | 3 | 2 | 5 | 1 | 3 | 2 | 3 | 0 | 0 | 0 | 5 | – | 0 | Tie | |
| Kantar Public | 18–21 May 2019 | 2 | 2 | 1 | 5 | 1 | 5 | 1 | 3 | 1 | 1 | 0 | 4 | – | – | Tie | |
| Peil.nl | 19 May 2019 | 2 | 4 | 1 | 4–5 | 1 | 4 | 2 | 2 | 1 | 0 | 0 | 4–5 | 0 | 0 | Tie | |
| I&O Research | 9–14 May 2019 | 2 | 3 | 2 | 4 | 1 | 3 | 2 | 3 | 1 | 1 | – | 4 | – | 0 | Tie | |
| Ipsos | 12–13 May 2019 | 3 | 3 | 2 | 5 | 1 | 3 | 1 | 3 | 0 | 0 | 0 | 5 | – | 0 | Tie | |
| Ipsos | 26–29 Apr 2019 | 2 | 3 | 2 | 5 | 1 | 2 | 2 | 3 | 1 | 0 | 0 | 5 | – | – | Tie | |
| I&O Research | 19–24 Apr 2019 | 3 | 2 | 1 | 5 | 2 | 3 | 2 | 4 | 0 | 0 | – | 4 | – | 0 | 1 | |
| 2014 election | 22 May 2014 | 4 | 5 | 4 | 3 | 2 | 3 | 2 | 2 | 1 | 0 | – | – | – | 0 | 1 | |

==== Vote share ====
| Polling firm | Date(s) | D66 | CDA | PVV | VVD | SP | PvdA | CU SGP | GL | PvdD | 50+ | DENK | FVD | Volt | Others | Lead | Ref |
|---|---|---|---|---|---|---|---|---|---|---|---|---|---|---|---|---|---|
| 2019 election | 23 May 2019 | 7.1% | 12.2% | 3.5% | 14.6% | 3.4% | 19.0% | 6.8% | 10.9% | 4.0% | 3.9% | 1.1% | 11.0% | 1.9% | 0.5% | 4.4% | |
| Ipsos | 20–21 May 2019 | 7.6% | 11.5% | 7.2% | 15.6% | 4.5% | 10.4% | 6.6% | 10.3% | 3.2% | 3.3% | 1.8% | 14.9% | – | 2.9% | 0.7% | |
| Kantar Public | 18–21 May 2019 | 7.5% | 7.9% | 5.2% | 17.0% | 5.8% | 15.0% | 5.9% | 11.0% | 4.1% | 4.9% | 1.2% | 13.1% | – | 1.4% | 2.0% | |
| Peil.nl | 19 May 2019 | 7.5% | 12.5% | 4.0% | 15.0% | 4.0% | 13.0% | 8.0% | 8.0% | 4.5% | 3.0% | 2.0% | 15.0% | 2.0% | 1.5% | Tie | |
| I&O Research | 9–14 May 2019 | 7.1% | 9.6% | 8.5% | 15.5% | 4.7% | 11.8% | 6.6% | 12.1% | 3.5% | 3.3% | – | 12.9% | – | 1.8% | 2.6% | |
| Ipsos | 12–13 May 2019 | 8.9% | 11.2% | 6.2% | 16.8% | 4.4% | 11.1% | 5.6% | 9.7% | 3.7% | 3.3% | 1.0% | 15.5% | – | 2.7% | 1.3% | |
| Ipsos | 26–29 Apr 2019 | 6.5% | 9.3% | 9.0% | 18.1% | 5.7% | 7.8% | 7.1% | 9.6% | 4.2% | 3.5% | 1.2% | 16.9% | – | – | 1.2% | |
| I&O Research | 19–24 Apr 2019 | 10.0% | 7.8% | 5.9% | 17.2% | 7.7% | 9.0% | 7.4% | 12.7% | 2.9% | 2.9% | – | 14.7% | – | 1.7% | 2.5% | |
| 2014 election | 22 May 2014 | 15.5% | 15.2% | 13.3% | 12.0% | 9.6% | 9.4% | 7.7% | 7.0% | 4.2% | 3.7% | – | – | – | 2.4% | 0.3% | |

== Results ==
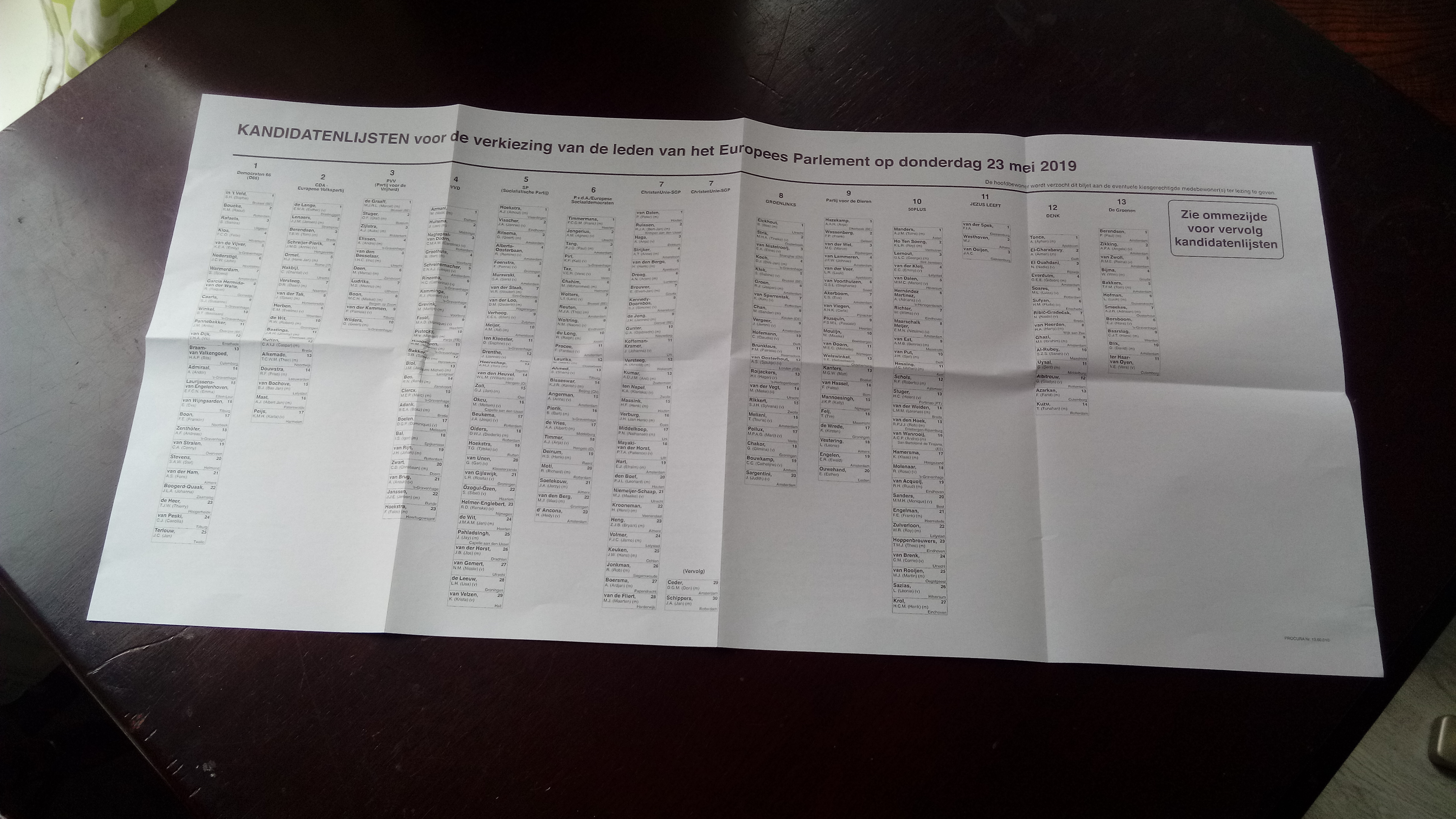
Candidate list

Voter turnout was 41.93%, higher than in 2014 (37.32%), and higher than any European Parliament election in the past twenty years.

| Party | Votes | % | Seats | | | |
| Party | Votes | % | Seats | +/– | Post-Brexit | +/– |
|---|---|---|---|---|---|---|
| Labour Party | 1,045,274 | 19.01 | 6 | +3 | 6 | 0 |
| People's Party for Freedom and Democracy | 805,100 | 14.64 | 4 | +1 | 5 | +1 |
| Christian Democratic Appeal | 669,555 | 12.18 | 4 | –1 | 4 | 0 |
| Forum for Democracy | 602,507 | 10.96 | 3 | New | 4 | +1 |
| GroenLinks | 599,283 | 10.90 | 3 | +1 | 3 | 0 |
| Democrats 66 | 389,692 | 7.09 | 2 | –2 | 2 | 0 |
| Christian Union – Reformed Political Party | 375,660 | 6.83 | 2 | 0 | 2 | 0 |
| Party for the Animals | 220,938 | 4.02 | 1 | 0 | 1 | 0 |
| 50PLUS | 215,199 | 3.91 | 1 | +1 | 1 | 0 |
| Party for Freedom | 194,178 | 3.53 | 0 | –4 | 1 | +1 |
| Socialist Party | 185,224 | 3.37 | 0 | –2 | 0 | 0 |
| Volt Netherlands | 106,004 | 1.93 | 0 | New | 0 | 0 |
| DENK | 60,669 | 1.10 | 0 | New | 0 | 0 |
| Of the Region & Pirate Party | 10,692 | 0.19 | 0 | 0 | 0 | 0 |
| The Greens | 9,546 | 0.17 | 0 | 0 | 0 | 0 |
| Jesus Lives | 8,292 | 0.15 | 0 | 0 | 0 | 0 |
| Total | 5,497,813 | 100.00 | 26 | 0 | 29 | +3 |
| Valid votes | 5,497,813 | 99.60 | | | | |
| Invalid/blank votes | 21,963 | 0.40 | | | | |
| Total votes | 5,519,776 | 100.00 | | | | |
| Registered voters/turnout | 13,164,688 | 41.93 | | | | |
Source: Kiesraad

=== European groups ===
Summary of the 23 May 2019 European Parliament elections in the Netherlands
2019
| European group | | Seats 2014 | Seats 2019 | Change | Seats (after Brexit) | Change (after Brexit |
| Renew Europe | RE | 7 | 6 | 1 ▼ | 7 | 1 ▲ |
| Progressive Alliance of Socialists and Democrats | S&D | 3 | 6 | 3 ▲ | 6 | 0 |
| European People's Party | EPP | 5 | 6 | 1 ▲ | 6 | 0 |
| European Conservatives and Reformists | ECR | 2 | 4 | 2 ▲ | 5 | 1 ▲ |
| The Greens–European Free Alliance | Greens-EFA | 2 | 3 | 1 ▲ | 3 | 0 |
| European United Left–Nordic Green Left | EUL-NGL | 3 | 1 | 2 ▼ | 1 | 0 |
| Identity and Democracy | ID | 4 | 0 | 4 ▼ | 1 | 1 ▲ |
| | | 26 | 26 | 0 | 29 | 3 ▲ |

=== Elected members ===
To be elected by preference votes, 10% of the electoral quota is needed. The electoral quota was 211,454. 10% of 211,454 = 21,145 votes.

36 members were directly elected by preference votes. Not all candidates could be appointed because either the party did not get enough seats, or it got no seats.

Members not elected, but enough preference votes:

- D66 – Raoul Boucke, by 22,500 votes
- VVD – Bart Groothuis, by 21,353 votes
- Christian Union-SGP – Anja Haga, by 37,813 votes
- GreenLeft – Sabine Klok, by 26,949 votes
- GreenLeft – Eline van Nistelrooij, by 26,250 votes
- 50PLUS – Emmy van der Kleij, by 24,723 votes
- PVV – Geert Wilders, by 83,448 votes
- PVV – Marcel de Graaff, by 81,073 votes
- SP – Arnout Hoekstra, by 93,809 votes
- SP – Jannie Visscher, by 35,498 votes
- DENK – Ayhan Tonca, by 25,302 votes
- Volt Netherlands – Reinier van Lanschot, by 51,621 votes
- Volt Netherlands – Nilüfer Vogels, by 21,951 votes
