= List of pro-European political parties =

This is a list of pro-European political parties in Europe, both active and defunct.

== By country ==
=== Albania ===
Name	Native name(s)	Reference(s)
Party of the Vlachs of Albania	Albanian: Partia e Vllehëve të Shqipërisë	
Freedom Party of Albania	Albanian: Partia e Lirisë	
G99		
Libra Party	Albanian: Partia Libra	
Macedonian Alliance for European Integration	Albanian: Aleanca Maqedonase për Integrimin Europian, Macedonian: Македонска Алијанса за Европска Интеграција	
New Democratic Spirit	Albanian: Fryma e Re Demokratike	
Republican Party of Albania	Albanian: Partia Republikane e Shqipërisë	
Unity for Human Rights Party	Albanian: Partia Bashkimi për të Drejtat e Njeriut, Greek: Κόμμα Ένωσης Ανθρωπίνων Δικαιωμάτων	
Volt Albania	Albanian: Volt Shqipëria	

=== Armenia ===
Name	Native name(s)	Reference(s)
Armenian National Movement Party	Armenian: Հայկական ազգային շարժում, romanized: Hayots' hamazgayin sharzhum kusakts'ut'yun	
Bright Armenia	Armenian: Լուսավոր Հայաստան, romanized: Lusavor Hayastan	
Civil Contract	Armenian: Քաղաքացիական պայմանագիր, romanized: K’aghak’atsiakan paymanagir	
Conservative Party	Armenian: Հայաստանի պահպանողական կուսակցություն, romanized: Hayastani pahpanoghakan kusakts'ut'yun	
European Party of Armenia	Armenian: Հայաստանի եվրոպական կուսակցություն, romanized: Hayastani yevropakan kusakts'ut'yun	
Fair Armenia Party	Armenian: Արդար Հայաստան կուսակցություն, romanized: Ardar Hayastan kusakts'ut'yun	
For The Republic Party	Armenian: Հանրապետություն կուսակցության համար, romanized: Hanrapetut'yun kusakts'ut'yan hamar	
Free Democrats	Armenian: Ազատ դեմոկրատներ, romanized: Azat demokratner	
Heritage	Armenian: Ժառանգություն, romanized: Zhaṙangut'yun	
Meritocratic Party of Armenia	Armenian: Հայաստանի Մերիտոկրատական կուսակցություն, romanized: Hayastani Meritokratakan kusakts’ut’yun	
National Democratic Pole	Armenian: Ազգային ժողովրդավարական բեւեռ, romanized: Azgayin zhoghovrdavarakan beverr	
Republic Party	Armenian: Հանրապետություն կուսակցություն, romanized: Hanrapetut'yun kusakts'ut'yun	
Rule of Law	Armenian: Օրինաց երկիր, romanized: Orenk'i gerakayut'yun	
Sasna Tsrer Pan-Armenian Party	Armenian: Սասնա Ծռեր համահայկական կուսակցություն, romanized: Sasna Tsřer hamahaykakan kusaktsutyun	
Sovereign Armenia Party	Armenian: Ինքնիշխան Հայաստան կուսակցություն, romanized: Ink'nishkhan Hayastan kusakts'ut'yun	
Union for National Self-Determination	Armenian: Ազգային ինքնորոշում միավորում, romanized: Azgayin ink'noroshum miavorum	

=== Austria ===
Name	Native name(s)	Reference(s)
Austrian People's Party	German: Österreichische Volkspartei	
Social Democratic Party of Austria	German: Sozialdemokratische Partei Österreichs	
The Greens – The Green Alternative	German: Die Grünen – Die Grüne Alternative	
NEOS – The New Austria and Liberal Forum	German: NEOS – Das Neue Österreich und Liberales Forum	
Der Wandel (Change)		
Volt Austria	German: Volt Österreich	

=== Azerbaijan ===
Name	Native name(s)	Reference(s)
Republican Alternative Party	Azerbaijani: Respublikaçı Alternativ Partiyası	

=== Belarus ===
Name	Native name(s)	Reference(s)
Belarusian Christian Democracy	Russian: Белорусская христианская демократия, romanized: Belorusskaya khristianskaya demokratiya Belarusian: Беларуская хрысьціянская дэмакратыя, romanized: Bielaruskaja chryścijanskaja demakratyja	
Belarusian Social Democratic Assembly	Russian: Белорусская социал-демократическая Грамада, romanized: Belorusskaya sotsial-demokraticheskaya Gramada, Belarusian: Беларуская сацыял-дэмакратычная Грамада, romanized: Bielaruskaja sacyjal-demakratyčnaja Hramada	
Belarusian Social Democratic Party (Assembly)	Russian: Белорусская социал-демократическая партия (Громада́), romanized: Belarusskaya Social-Demokraticheskaya Partiya (Hromada), Belarusian: Беларуская сацыял-дэмакратычная партыя (Грамада́)	
BPF Party	Russian: Партия БНФ, romanized: Partiya BNF, Belarusian: Партыя БНФ, romanized: Partyja BNF	
Party of Freedom and Progress	Russian: Партия свободы и прогресса, romanized: Partiya svobody i progressa, Belarusian: Партыя свабоды і прагрэсу, romanized: Partyja svabody i prahresu	
United Civic Party	Russian: Объединённая гражданская партия, romanized: Obyedinonnaya grazhdanskaya partiya, Belarusian: Аб'яднаная грамадзянская партыя, romanized: Abjadnanaja hramadzianskaja partyja	
United Democratic Forces of Belarus	Russian: Объединённые демократические силы, Belarusian: Аб'яднаныя дэмакратычныя сілы Беларусі	

=== Belgium ===
Name	Native name(s)	Reference(s)
Christian Democratic and Flemish	Dutch: Christen-Democratisch en Vlaam, West Flemish: Christen Democratisch en Vlaams	
DéFI		
Ecolo		
Groen (Green)		
Les Engagés (The Committed Ones)		
Anders (Different)		
Reformist Movement	French: Mouvement Réformateur	
Socialist Party	French: Parti Socialiste, Walloon: Pårti Socialisse	
Volt Belgium	Dutch: Volt België, French: Volt Belgique, German: Volt Belgien	
Vooruit (Forward)		

=== Bosnia and Herzegovina ===
Name	Native name(s)	Reference(s)
Democratic Front	Bosnian: Демократски фронт, romanized: Demokratski front	
Independent Bloc	Bosnian: Независни блок, romanized: Nezavisni blok	
Our Party	Bosnian: Наша странка, romanized: Naša stranka	
Party of Democratic Progress	Serbian: Партија демократског прогреса, romanized: Partija demokratskog progresa, Bosnian: Partija Demokratskog Progresa	
Social Democratic Party	Bosnian: Социјалдемократска партија, romanized: Socijaldemokratska partija	
Union for a Better Future of BiH	Bosnian: Savez za Bollju Budućnost BiH	

=== Bulgaria ===
Name	Native name(s)	Reference(s)
Bulgaria for Citizens Movement	Bulgarian: Движение България на гражданите, romanized: Bulgariya na grazhdanite	
Bulgarian Euro-Left	Bulgarian: Българска Евролевица, romanized: Bulgarska Evrolevitsa	
Bulgarian Socialist Party (factions)	Bulgarian: Българска социалистическа партия, romanized: Balgarska sotsialisticheska partiya	
Democrats for a Strong Bulgaria	Bulgarian: Демократи за силна България, romanized: Demokrati za silna Balgariya	
GERB	Bulgarian: ГЕРБ	
Movement 21	Bulgarian: Движение 21, romanized: Dvizhenie 21	
Republicans for Bulgaria	Bulgarian: Републиканци за България, romanized: Republikantsi za Balgariya	
Stand Up.BG	Bulgarian: Изправи се.БГ, romanized: Izpravi se.BG	
Union of Democratic Forces	Bulgarian: Съюз на демократичните сили, romanized: Sayuz na demokratichnite sili	
United People's Party	Bulgarian: Единна народна партия, romanized: Edinna narodna partiya	
Volt Bulgaria	Bulgarian: Волт България	
We Continue the Change	Bulgarian: Продължаваме промяната, romanized: Prodalzhavame promyanata	
Yes, Bulgaria!	Bulgarian: Да, България!, romanized: Da, Bulgariya!	

=== Croatia ===
Name	Native name(s)	Reference(s)
Centre	Croatian: Centar	
Civic Liberal Alliance	Croatian: Građansko-Liberalni Savez	
Croatian Democratic Union	Croatian: Hrvatska Demokratska Zajednica, lit. 'Croatian Democratic Community'	
Croatian Peasant Party	Croatian: Hrvatska Seljačka Stranka	
Croatian People's Party – Liberal Democrats	Croatian: Hrvatska Narodna Stranka – Liberalni Demokrati	
Croatian Social Liberal Party	Croatian: Hrvatska Socijalno-Liberalna Stranka	
Istrian Democratic Assembly	Croatian: Istarski Demokratski Sabor, Italian: Dieta Democratica Istriana	
People's Party – Reformists	Croatian: Narodna Stranka – Reformisti	
Social Democratic Party of Croatia	Croatian: Socijaldemokratska Partija Hrvatske	

=== Cyprus ===
Name	Native name(s)	Reference(s)
Democratic Party	Greek: Δημοκρατικό Κόμμα, romanized: Dimokratikó Kómma, Turkish: Demokrat Parti	
Democratic Rally	Greek: Δημοκρατικός Συναγερμός, romanized: Dimokratikós Sinagermós, Turkish: Demokratik Seferberlik	
Movement for Social Democracy	Greek: Κίνημα Σοσιαλδημοκρατών, romanized: Kinima Sosialdimokraton	
New Wave – The Other Cyprus	Greek: Νέο Κύμα - Η Άλλη Κύπρος	
Volt Cyprus	Greek: Βολτ Κύπρος	

=== Czech Republic ===
Name	Native name(s)	Reference(s)
Mayors and Independents	Czech: Starostové a nezávislí	
Czech Pirate Party	Czech: Česká pirátská strana	
KDU-ČSL	Czech: KDU-ČSL	
TOP 09	Czech: TOP 09	
SEN 21	Czech: SEN 21	
Green Party	Czech: Strana zelených, lit. 'Party of Greens'	
Social Democracy	Czech: Sociální demokracie	
Volt Czech Republic	Czech: Volt Česko	

=== Denmark ===
Name	Native name(s)	Reference(s)
Conservative People's Party	Danish: Det Konservative Folkeparti	
Danish Social Liberal Party	Danish: Radikale Venstre, lit. 'Radical Left'	
Moderates	Danish: Moderaterne	
Social Democrats	Danish: Socialdemokraterne	
The Alternative	Danish: Alternativet	
Venstre	Danish: Venstre, lit. 'Left'	
Volt Denmark	Danish: Volt Danmark	

=== Estonia ===
Name	Native name(s)	Reference(s)
Estonian Greens	Estonian: Erakond Eestimaa Rohelised	
Estonian Reform Party	Estonian: Eesti Reformierakond	
Isamaa (Fatherland)		
Social Democratic Party	Estonian: Sotsiaaldemokraatlik Erakond	

=== Finland ===
Name	Native name(s)	Reference(s)
Centre Party	Finnish: Suomen Keskusta, Swedish: Centern i Finland	
Green League	Finnish: Vihreä Liitto, Swedish: Gröna Förbundet	
National Coalition Party	Finnish: Kansallinen Kokoomus, Swedish: Samlingspartiet	
Social Democratic Party of Finland	Finnish: Suomen Sosialidemokraattinen Puolue, Swedish: Finlands Socialdemokratiska Parti	
Swedish People's Party of Finland	Swedish: Svenska Folkpartiet i Finland, Finnish: Suomen Ruotsalainen Kansanpuolue	

=== France ===
Name	Native name(s)	Reference(s)
Agir (Act)		
Centrist Alliance	French: Alliance Centriste	
Democratic European Force	French: Force Européenne Démocrate	
Democratic Movement	French: Mouvement Démocrate	
En Commun (In Common)		
Europe Ecology – The Greens	French: Europe Écologie les Verts	
Génération.s		
Horizons		
New Deal	French: Nouvelle Donne	
Ecologist Party	French: Parti Écologiste	
Place Publique (Public Place)		
Radical Party of the Left	French: Parti Radical de Gauche	
Radical Party	French: Parti Radical	
Renaissance		
Socialist Party	French: Parti Socialiste	
Territories of Progress	French: Territoires de Progrès	
The Centrists	French: Les Centristes	
The New Democrats	French: Les Nouveaux Démocrates	
The Republicans	French: Les Républicains	
Union of Democrats and Independents	French: Union des Démocrates et Indépendants	
Volt France	French: Volt France	

=== Georgia ===
Name	Native name(s)	Reference(s)
Ahali	Georgian: ახალი, romanized: akhali	
Citizens	Georgian: მოქალაქეები, romanized: mokalakeebi	
Droa	Georgian: დროა, romanized: droa	
European Georgia	Georgian: ევროპული საქართველო, romanized: evrop'uli sakartvelo	
Federalists	Georgian: ფედერალისტები, romanized: pederalist'ebi	
For Georgia	Georgian: საქართველოსთვის, romanized: sakartvelostvis	
For the People	Georgian: ხალხისთვის, romanized: khalkhistvis	
Free Democrats	Georgian: თავისუფალი დემოკრატები, romanized: tavisupali demok'rat'ebi	
Freedom Square	Georgian: თავისუფლების მოედანი, romanized: tavisuplebis moedani	
Georgian Labour Party	Georgian: საქართველოს ლეიბორისტული პარტია, romanized: sakartvelos leiborist'uli p'art'ia	
Girchi – More Freedom	Georgian: გირჩი – მეტი თავისუფლება, romanized: girchi – met'i tavisupleba	
Lelo for Georgia	Georgian: ლელო საქართველოსთვის, romanized: lelo sakartvelostvis	
Movement for Social Democracy	Georgian: მოძრაობა სოციალური დემოკრატიისთვის, romanized: modzraoba sotsialuri demok'rat'iistvis	
Party of The Free	Georgian: თავისუფალი ხალხის პარტია, romanized: tavisupali khalkhis p'art'ia	
Republican Party of Georgia	Georgian: საქართველოს რესპუბლიკური პარტია, romanized: sakartvelos resp'ublik'uri p'art'ia	
Strategy Aghmashenebeli	Georgian: სტრატეგია აღმაშენებელი, romanized: st'rat'egia aghmashenebeli	
United National Movement	Georgian: ერთიანი ნაციონალური მოძრაობა, romanized: ertiani natsionaluri modzraoba	

=== Germany ===
Name	Native name(s)	Reference(s)
Alliance 90/The Greens	German: Bündnis 90/Die Grünen	
Christian Democratic Union of Germany	German: Christlich Demokratische Union Deutschlands	
Christian Social Union in Bavaria	German: Christlich-Soziale Union in Bayern	
Die PARTEI (The PARTY)		
Free Democratic Party	German: Freie Demokratische Partei	
MERA25	German: Europäische realistische Ungehorsamfront, lit. 'European realistic disobedience front'	
Party of Humanists	German: Partei der Humanisten	
Social Democratic Party of Germany	German: Sozialdemokratische Partei Deutschlands	
Volt Germany	German: Volt Deutschland	

=== Greece ===
Name	Native name(s)	Reference(s)
MeRA25	Greek: Μέτωπο Ευρωπαϊκής Ρεαλιστικής Ανυπακοής, lit. 'European Realistic Disobedience Front'	
Movement of Democratic Socialists	Greek: Κίνημα Δημοκρατών Σοσιαλιστών, romanized: Kinima Dimokraton Sosialiston	
New Democracy	Greek: Νέα Δημοκρατία, romanized: Néa Dimokratía	
PASOK – Movement for Change	Greek: ΠΑΣΟΚ – Κίνημα Αλλαγής, romanized: PASOK – Kínima Allagís	
Syriza	Greek: Συριζα	
Union of Centrists	Greek: Ένωση Κεντρώων, romanized: Énosi Kentróon	
Volt Greece	Greek: Βολτ Ελλάδας	

=== Hungary ===
Name	Native name(s)	Reference(s)
Democratic Coalition	Hungarian: Demokratikus Koalíció	
Dialogue – The Greens' Party	Hungarian: Párbeszéd - A Zöldek Pártja	
Hungarian Liberal Party	Hungarian: Magyar Liberális Párt	
Hungarian Socialist Party	Hungarian: Magyar Szocialista Párt	
Jobbik	Hungarian: Jobbik	
LMP – Hungary's Green Party	Hungarian: LMP – Magyarország Zöld Pártja	
Momentum Movement	Hungarian: Momentum Mozgalom	
New Start	Hungarian: Új Kezdet	
Tisza Party	Hungarian: Tisza Párt	

=== Iceland ===
Name	Native name(s)	Reference(s)
Viðreisn	Icelandic: Viðreisn	
Social Democratic Alliance	Icelandic: Samfylkingin	

=== Ireland ===
Name	Native name(s)	Reference(s)
Fianna Fáil (Soldiers of Destiny)		
Fine Gael (Family of the Irish)		
Green Party	Irish: Comhaontas Glas, lit. 'Green Alliance'	
Labour Party	Irish: Páirtí an Lucht Oibre, lit. 'Party of the Working People'	
Social Democrats	Irish: Na Daonlathaithe Sóisialta	

=== Italy ===
Name	Native name(s)	Reference(s)
Action	Italian: Azione	
Alliance of the Centre	Italian: Alleanza di Centro	
Article One	Italian: Articolo Uno	
Centrists for Europe	Italian: Centristi per l'Europa	
Civic Commitment	Italian: Impegno Civico	
Democratic Party	Italian: Partito Democratico	
Europeanists	Italian: Europeisti	
European Republicans Movement	Italian: Movimento Repubblicani Europei	
èViva	Italian: It is Alive	
Forza Europa (Forward Europe)		
Forza Italia (Forward Italy)		
Green Europe	Italian: Europa Verde	
Italia Viva (Italy Alive)		
Italian Radicals	Italian: Radicali Italiani	
Italian Republican Party	Italian: Partito Repubblicano Italiano	
Italian Socialist Party	Italian: Partito Socialista Italiano	
Liberal Democratic Alliance for Italy	Italian: Alleanza Liberaldemocratica per l'Italia	
Moderates	Italian: Moderati	
More Europe	Italian: Più Europa	
Possible		
Sicilian Socialist Party	Italian: Partito Socialista Siciliano, Sicilian: Partitu Sucialista Sicilianu	
Social Democracy	Italian: Socialdemocrazia	
Solidary Democracy	Italian: Democrazia Solidale	
Team K		
Together for the Future	Italian: Insieme per il Futuro	
Us of the Centre	Italian: Noi di Centro	
Volt Italy	Italian: Volt Italia	

=== Kazakhstan ===
Name	Native name(s)	Reference(s)
Democratic Party of Kazakhstan	Kazakh: Қазақстанның Демократиялық Партиясы, romanized: Qazaqstannıñ Demokratïyalıq Partïyası	
Democratic Choice of Kazakhstan	Kazakh: Қазақстанның Демократиялық Таңдауы, romanized: Qazaqstannıñ Demokratïyalıq Tañdawı	
Aq Jol	Kazakh: Қазақстанның «Ақ жол» демократиялық партиясы, romanized: Qazaqstannyñ «Aq jol» demokratialyq partiasy	

=== Kosovo ===
Name	Native name(s)	Reference(s)
Alliance for the Future of Kosovo	Albanian: Aleanca për Ardhmërinë e Kosovës	
Democratic League of Kosovo	Albanian: Lidhja Demokratike e Kosovës	
Partia e Fortë (Strong Party)		

=== Latvia ===
Name	Native name(s)	Reference(s)
For Latvia's Development	Latvian: Latvijas Attīstībai	
Movement For!	Latvian: Kustība Par!	
The Conservatives	Latvian: Konservatīvie	
The Progressives	Latvian: Progresīvie	
Unity	Latvian: Vienotība	

=== Lithuania ===
Name	Native name(s)	Reference(s)
Freedom Party	Lithuanian: Laisvės Partija	
Homeland Union	Lithuanian: Tėvynės Sąjunga	
Liberals' Movement	Lithuanian: Liberalų sąjūdis	
Social Democratic Party of Lithuania	Lithuanian: Lietuvos Socialdemokratų Partija	

=== Luxembourg ===
Name	Native name(s)	Reference(s)
Christian Social People's Party	Luxembourgish: Chrëschtlech Sozial Vollekspartei, French: Parti Populaire Chrétien-Social, German: Christlich Soziale Volkspartei	
Democratic Party	(Luxembourgish: Demokratesch Partei, French: Parti Démocratique, German: Demokratische Partei	
Luxembourg Socialist Workers' Party	Luxembourgish: Lëtzebuerger Sozialistesch Aarbechterpartei, French: Parti Ouvrier Socialiste Luxembourgeois, German: Luxemburger Sozialistische Arbeiterpartei	
The Greens	Luxembourgish: Déi Gréng, French: Les Verts, German: Die Grünen	
Volt Luxembourg	Luxembourgish: Volt Lëtzebuerg, French: Volt Luxembourg, German: Volt Luxemburg	

=== Malta ===
Name	Native name(s)	Reference(s)
AD+PD		
Labour Party (factions)	Maltese: Partit Laburista	
Nationalist Party	Maltese: Partit Nazzjonalista	
Volt Malta		

=== Moldova ===
Name	Native name(s)	Reference(s)
European People's Party of Moldova	Romanian: Partidul Popular European din Moldova	
European Social Democratic Party	Romanian: Partidul Social Democrat European	
Liberal Democratic Party of Moldova	Romanian: Partidul Liberal Democrat din Moldova	
Liberal Party	Romanian: Partidul Liberal	
National Alternative Movement	Romanian: Mișcarea Alternativa Națională	
Party of Action and Solidarity	Romanian: Partidul Acțiune și Solidaritate	
People's Party of the Republic of Moldova	Romanian: Partidul Popular din Republica Moldova	
Pro Moldova		

=== Montenegro ===
Name	Native name(s)	Reference(s)
Bosniak Party	Bosnian: Bošnjačka stranka, Montenegrin: Бошњачка странка	
Civis	Montenegrin: Цивис	
Democratic Montenegro	Montenegrin: Демократска Црна Гора, romanized: Demokratska Crna Gora	
Democratic Party of Socialists of Montenegro	Montenegrin: Демократска партија социјалиста Црне Горе, romanized: Demokratska partija socijalista Crne Gore	
DEMOS	Montenegrin: ДЕМОС	
Liberal Party of Montenegro	Montenegrin: Либерална партија Црне Горе, romanized: Liberalna partija Crne Gore	
Social Democratic Party of Montenegro	Montenegrin: Социјалдемократска партија Црне Горе, romanized: Socijaldemokratska partija Crne Gore	
Social Democrats of Montenegro	Montenegrin: Социјалдемократе Црне Горе, romanized: Socijaldemokrate Crne Gore	
Socialist People's Party of Montenegro	Montenegrin: Социјалистичка народна партија Црне Горе, romanized: Socijalistička narodna partija Crne Gore	
United Reform Action	Montenegrin: Грађански покрет Уједињена реформска акција, romanized: Građanski pokret Ujedinjena reformska akcija	
We Won't Give Up Montenegro	Montenegrin: Не дамо Црну Гору, romanized: Ne damo Crnu Goru	

=== Netherlands ===
Name	Native name(s)	Reference(s)
Christian Democratic Appeal	Dutch: Christen-Democratisch Appèl	
Democrats 66	Dutch: Democraten 66	
GroenLinks (GreenLeft)		
Labour Party	Dutch: Partij van de Arbeid	
People's Party for Freedom and Democracy	Dutch: Volkspartij voor Vrijheid en Democratie	
Volt Netherlands	Dutch: Volt Nederland	

=== North Macedonia ===
Name	Native name(s)	Reference(s)
Alliance for Albanians	Albanian: Aleanca për Shqiptarët, Macedonian: Алијанса за Албанците, romanized: Alijansa za Albancite	
Besa Movement	Albanian: Lëvizja Besa, Macedonian: Движење Беса, romanized: Dviženje Besa	
Democratic Union for Integration	Albanian: Bashkimi Demokratik për Integrim, Macedonian: Демократска унија за интеграција, romanized: Demokratska unija za integracija	
Liberal Democratic Party	Macedonian: Либерално-демократска Партија, romanized: Liberalno-demokratska Partija	
New Social Democratic Party	Macedonian: Нова социјалдемократска партија, romanized: Nova socijaldemokratska partija	
Social Democratic Union of Macedonia	Macedonian: Социјалдемократски сојуз на Македонија, romanized: Socijaldemokratski sojuz na Makedonija, Albanian: Lidhja socialdemokrate e Maqedonisë	
VMRO-DPMNE	Macedonian: ВMPO–ДПМНЕ, romanized: VMRO–DPMNE	
VMRO – People's Party	Macedonian: ВMPO–Народна Партија, romanized: VMRO–Narodna Partija	

=== Norway ===
Name	Native name(s)	Reference(s)
Conservative Party	Bokmål: Høyre, lit. 'Right', Nynorsk: Høgre, lit. 'Right', Northern Sami: Olgešbellodat	
Labour Party (factions)	Bokmål: Arbeiderpartiet, Nynorsk: Arbeidarpartiet, Northern Sami: Bargiidbellodat	
Liberal Party	Norwegian: Venstre, lit. 'Left', Northern Sami: Gurutbellodat	
Green Party	Bokmål: Miljøpartiet De Grønne, Nynorsk: Miljøpartiet Dei Grøne, Northern Sami: Birasbellodat Ruonát	

=== Poland ===
Name	Native name(s)	Reference(s)
Civic Coalition	Polish: Koalicja Obywatelska	
Together Party	Polish: Partia Razem	
New Left	Polish: Nowa Lewica	
Poland 2050	Polish: Polska 2050	
Polish People's Party	Polish: Polskie Stronnictwo Ludowe	
Polish Socialist Party	Polish: Polska Partia Socjalistyczna	
The Greens	Polish: Partia Zieloni	
Union of European Democrats	Polish: Unia Europejskich Demokratów	

=== Portugal ===
Name	Native name(s)	Reference(s)
Liberal Initiative	Portuguese: Iniciativa Liberal	
LIVRE (FREE)		
People–Animals–Nature	Portuguese: Pessoas–Animais–Natureza	
Social Democratic Party	Portuguese: Partido Social Democrata	
Socialist Party	Portuguese: Partido Socialista	
Volt Portugal		

=== Romania ===
Name	Native name(s)	Reference(s)
Democratic Alliance of Hungarians in Romania	Hungarian: Romániai Magyar Demokrata Szövetség, Romanian: Uniunea Democrată Maghiară din România	
Green Party	Romanian: Partidul Verde	
National Liberal Party	Romanian: Partidul Național Liberal	
People's Movement Party	Romanian: Partidul Mișcarea Populară	
PRO Romania	Romanian: PRO România	
Party of the Roma	Romanian: Partida Romilor "Pro Europa" lit. 'Party of the Roma "Pro Europe"', Vlax Romani: Partida le Romenge	
Renewing Romania's European Project	Romanian: Reînnoim Proiectul European al României	
Romanian Socialist Party	Romanian: Partidul Socialist Român	
Save Romania Union	Romanian: Uniunea Salvați România	
Social Democratic Party	Romanian: Partidul Social Democrat	
Volt Romania	Romanian: Volt România	

=== Russia ===
Name	Native name(s)	Reference(s)
Democratic Party of Russia	Russian: Демократическая Партия России, romanized: Demokraticheskaya Partiya Rossii	
Green Alternative	Russian: Зелёная альтернатива, romanized: Zelyonaya al'ternativa	
People's Freedom Party	Russian: Партия народной свободы, romanized: Partiya narodnoy svobody	
Russia of the Future	Russian: Россия Будущего, romanized: Rossiya Budushchego	
Yabloko	Russian: Яблоко	

=== San Marino ===
Name	Native name(s)	Reference(s)
Civic 10	Italian: Civico 10	
Euro-Populars for San Marino	Italian: Europopolari per San Marino	
Future Republic	Italian: Repubblica Futura	
Party of Democrats	Italian: Partito dei Democratici	
Party of Socialists and Democrats	Italian: Partito dei Socialisti e dei Democratici	
Sammarineses for Freedom	Italian: Sammarinesi per la Libertà	
Socialist Party	Italian: Partito Socialista	
Union for the Republic	Italian: Unione per la Repubblica	

=== Serbia ===
Name	Native name(s)	Reference(s)
Civic Democratic Forum	Serbian: Грађански демократски форум, romanized: Građanski demokratski forum	
Democratic Party	Serbian: Демократска странка, romanized: Demokratska stranka	
Liberal Democratic Party	Serbian: Либерално демократска партија, romanized: Liberalno demokratska partija	
Movement for Reversal	Serbian: Покрет за преокрет, romanized: Pokret za preokret	
Movement of Free Citizens	Serbian: Покрет слободних грађана, romanized: Pokret slobodnih građana	
New Party	Serbian: Нова странка, romanized: Nova stranka	
Party of Freedom and Justice	Serbian: Странка слободе и правде, romanized: Stranka slobode i pravde	
Party of Modern Serbia	Serbian: Странка модерне Србије, romanized: Stranka moderne Srbije	
People's Party	Serbian: Народна странка, romanized: Narodna stranka	
Serbia 21	Serbian: Србија 21, romanized: Srbija 21	
Social Democratic Party	Serbian: Социјалдемократска странка, romanized: Socijaldemokratska stranka	
Together for Serbia	Serbian: Заједно за Србију, romanized: Zajedno za Srbiju	

=== Slovakia ===
Name	Native name(s)	Reference(s)
Christian Democratic Movement	Slovak: Kresťanskodemokratické Hnutie	
Democrats	Slovak: Demokrati	
For the People	Slovak: Za Ľudí	
Hungarian Alliance	Hungarian: Magyar Szövetség, Slovak: Maďarská Aliancia	
Progressive Slovakia	Slovak: Progresívne Slovensko	
Slovakia	Slovak: Slovensko	
Voice – Social Democracy	Slovak: Hlas – Sociálna Demokracia	
Volt Slovakia	Slovak: Volt Slovensko	

=== Slovenia ===
Name	Native name(s)	Reference(s)
Democrats	Slovene: Demokrati	
Freedom Movement	Slovene: Gibanje Svoboda	
New Slovenia	Slovene: Nova Slovenija	
Slovenian People's Party	Slovene: Slovenska Ljudska Stranka	
Social Democrats	Slovene: Socialni Demokrati	
Vesna – Green Party	Slovene: VESNA – zelena stranka	

=== Spain ===
Name	Native name(s)	Reference(s)
Citizens	Spanish: Ciudadanos, Catalan: Ciutadans, Basque: Hiritarrak, Galician: Cidadáns	
For a Fairer World	Spanish: Por un Mundo más Justo	
Greens Equo	Spanish: Verdes Equo	
People's Party	Spanish: Partido Popular	
Spanish Socialist Workers' Party	Spanish: Partido Socialista Obrero Español	
Volt Spain	Spanish: Volt España	

=== Sweden ===
Name	Native name(s)	Reference(s)
Centre Party	Swedish: Centerpartiet	
Christian Democrats	Swedish: Kristdemokraterna	
Liberals	Swedish: Liberalerna	
Moderate Party	Swedish: Moderata Samlingspartiet, lit. 'Moderate Coalition Party'	
Swedish Social Democratic Party	Swedish: Sveriges Socialdemokratiska Parti	
Volt Sweden	Swedish: Volt Sverige	

=== Switzerland ===
Name	Native name(s)	Reference(s)
Green Liberal Party of Switzerland	German: Grünliberale Partei, French: Parti Vert'libéral, Italian: Partito Verde-Liberale, Romansh: Partida Verda-Liberala	
Green Party of Switzerland (factions)	German: Grüne Schweiz, French: Les Vertes Suisses, Italian: Verdi Svizzeri, Romansh: Verda Svizra	
Social Democratic Party of Switzerland (factions)	German: Sozialdemokratische Partei der Schweiz, French: Parti Socialiste Suisse, lit. 'Swiss Socialist Party', Italian: Partito Socialista Svizzero, lit. 'Swiss Socialist Party', Romansh: Partida Socialdemocrata da la Svizra	
Volt Switzerland	German: Volt Schweiz, French: Volt Suisse, Italian: Volt Svizzera, Romansh: Volt Svizra	

=== Turkey ===
Name	Native name(s)	Reference(s)
Democratic Left Party	Turkish: Demokratik Sol Parti	
Democrat Party	Turkish: Demokrat Parti	
Democracy and Progress Party	Turkish: Demokrasi ve Atılım Partisi, lit. 'Democracy and Enterprise Party'	
Future Party	Turkish: Gelecek Partisi	
Good Party	Turkish: İyi Parti	
Homeland Party	Turkish: Memleket Partisi	
Liberal Democratic Party	Turkish: Liberal Demokrat Parti	
New Party	Turkish: Yeni Parti	
Peoples' Democratic Party	Turkish: Halkların Demokratik Partisi, Kurdish: Partiya Demokratîk a Gelan	
Republican People's Party	Turkish: Cumhuriyet Halk Partisi	

=== Ukraine ===
Name	Native name(s)	Reference(s)
Batkivshchyna (Fatherland)	Ukrainian: Батьківщина	
European Party of Ukraine	Ukrainian: Європейська партія України, romanized: Yeropeys'ka partiya Ukraïni	
European Solidarity	Ukrainian: Європейська солідарність, romanized: Yevropeis'ka solidarnist'	
Holos (Voice/Vote)	Ukrainian: Голос	
Our Ukraine	Ukrainian: Наша Україна, romanized: Nasha Ukraïna	
People's Front	Ukrainian: Народний фронт, romanized: Narodiny front	
Platform for Life and Peace	Ukrainian: Платформа за життя та мир, romanized: Platforma za zhyttia ta myr	
Self Reliance	Ukrainian: Самопоміч, romanized: Samopomich	
Servant of the People	Ukrainian: Слуга народу, romanized: Sluha narodu	
Ukrainian People's Party	Ukrainian: Українська Народна Партія, romanized: Ukrains'ka Narodna Partiya	
Volt Ukraine	Ukrainian: Вольт Україна	

=== United Kingdom ===
Name	Native name(s)	Reference(s)
Alliance EPP: European People's Party UK		
Alliance Party of Northern Ireland		
Animal Welfare Party		
Co-operative Party		
Green Party Northern Ireland		
Green Party of England and Wales	Welsh: Plaid Werdd Cymru a Lloegr, Cornish: Party Gwer Pow an Sowson ha Kembra	
Labour Party (factions)		
Liberal Democrats		
Mebyon Kernow (Sons of Cornwall)		
Rejoin EU		
Scottish Greens	Scots: Scots Green Pairty, Scottish Gaelic: Pàrtaidh Uaine na h-Alba	
Scottish National Party	Scots: Scots National Pairty, Scottish Gaelic: Pàrtaidh Nàiseanta na h-Alba	
Social Democratic and Labour Party	Irish: Páirtí Sóisialta Daonlathach an Lucht Oibre	
Volt UK		
Women's Equality Party		

=== Yugoslavia ===
Name	Native name(s)	Reference(s)
Union of Reform Forces of Yugoslavia	Serbo-Croatian: Савез реформских снага Југославије, Savez reformskih snaga Jugoslavije	

== See also ==
- List of European federalist political parties
- List of Eurosceptic political parties
