= Volt (disambiguation) =

Volt (symbol V) is the SI derived unit for electromotive force and potential difference, named after Alessandro Volta.

Volt or Volts may also refer to:

== Electrical measurement ==
- electron volt (eV), a unit of energy in physics
- volt-ampere (VA), a unit used to measure the apparent power in an electrical circuit
- volt-ampere reactive (var), a unit used to measure reactive power in an AC system
- Volt meter, instrument for measuring electrical potential
- Volt-ohm meter (VOM), instrument that combines several electrical measurement functions
- volt-second (V⋅s), more commonly the weber (Wb), a unit of magnetic flux
- Volts Center Tapped (VCT), a unit of voltage output of a center tapped transformer

== Entertainment and media ==
- Ugo Volt, a computer game
- Volt, a Sonoma State University poetry magazine
- Volt (Dungeons & Dragons), a fictional creature
- Volt (Transformers), a fictional character
- Volt (TV series), French Canadian
- Volt Records
- Volts (album), an album by AC/DC
- Volt, an EP by Trip Shakespeare
- Volt, a character in Warframe

== People ==
- Alessandro Volta (1745–1827), the Italian physicist after whom the term volt is named

== Other uses ==
- Chevrolet Volt, an American plug-in hybrid automobile
- Volt Europa, a pro-European and federalist European political movement, often referred to as "Volt". Branches:
  - Volt Albania
  - Volt Austria
  - Volt Belgium
  - Volt Bulgaria
  - Volt Cyprus
  - Volt Czech Republic
  - Volt Denmark
  - Volt France
  - Volt Germany
  - Volt Greece
  - Volt Ireland
  - Volt Italy
  - Volt Luxembourg
  - Volt Malta
  - Volt Netherlands
  - Volt Poland
  - Volt Portugal
  - Volt Slovakia
  - Volt Spain
  - Volt Sweden
  - Volt Switzerland
  - Volt Ukraine
  - Volt UK
- Volt Technical Resources, a US recruiting company
- VoltDB, an in-memory database
- Volt, Nike company's name for the colour electric lime
- Former Volt Bank, Australia

== See also ==
- Voltage (disambiguation)
- Megavolt (disambiguation)
- Ampere (disambiguation)
