= Pro-Europeanism =

Favouring European integration

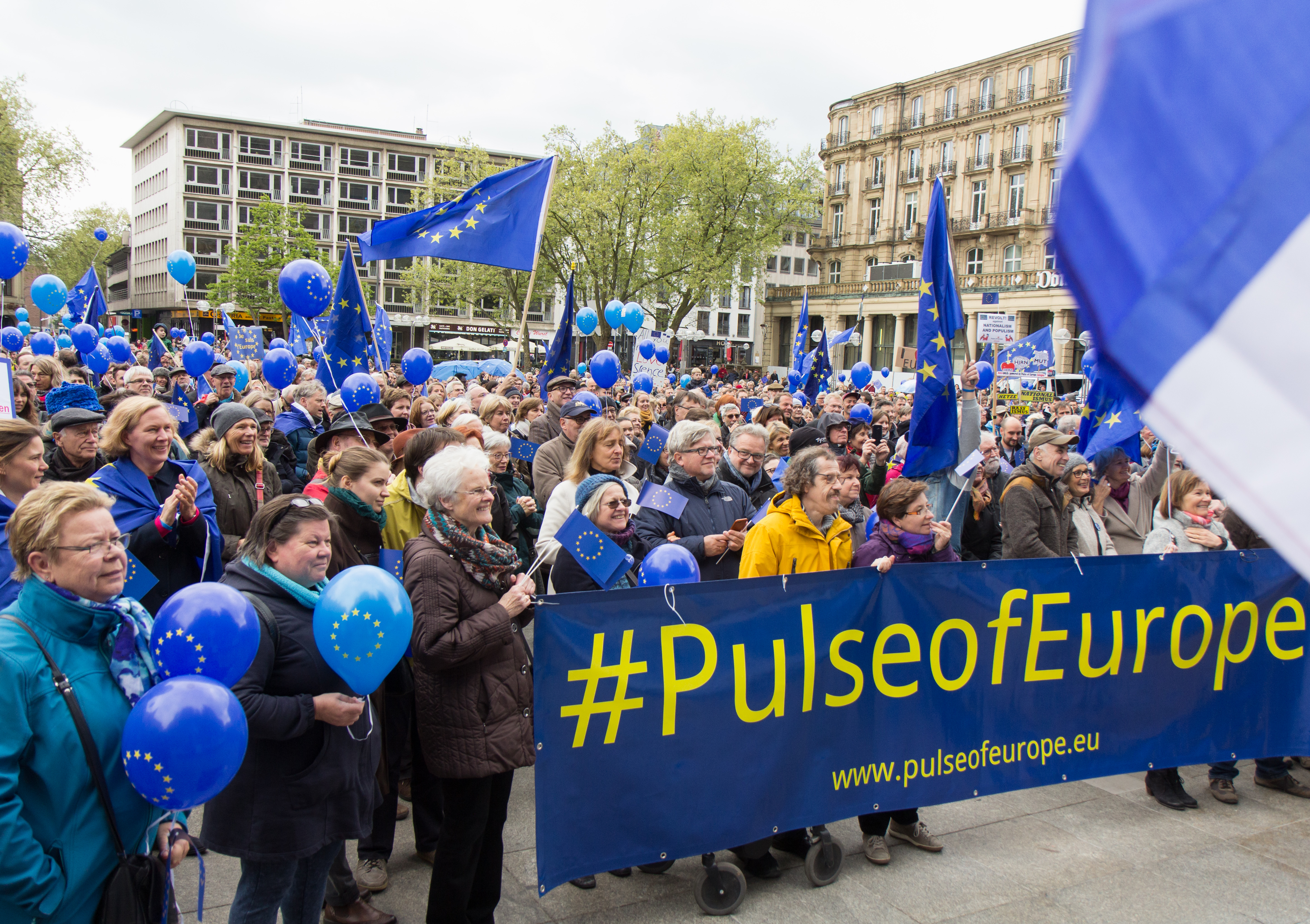
Pro-European participants attending the Pulse of Europe rally in Cologne, Germany (2017)

Pro-Europeanism, sometimes called European Unionism, is a political position that favours European integration and membership of the European Union (EU). The opposite of Pro-Europeanism is Euroscepticism.

== Political position ==
Percentage responding that their country on balance benefited from being a member of the EU at Eurobarometer 2026: 91–100% 81–90% 71–80% / 61–70% 51–60%

Pro-Europeans are mostly classified as centrist (Renew Europe) in the context of pan-European politics, including centre-right liberal conservatives (EPP Group) and centre-left social democrats (S&D and Greens/EFA). Pro-Europeanism is ideologically closely related to the European and global liberal movement.

Pro-Europeans often argue that EU membership has specific benefits for member nations such as that the EU encourages economic prosperity among members, that it promotes peace and stability in member states, that it encourages social progress among member states, that the EU gives countries greater leverage on the world stage compared to countries not in the EU, and that Europeans have shared values and identity. They also argue that these benefits outweigh common criticisms and issues of the EU for member states.

Some pro-Europeans may also support a stronger and more centralized EU as well as the idea of a Federal Europe and further European integration among member states.

== Pro-EU political parties ==
=== Pan-European level ===
- (European Union) EU: Alliance of Liberals and Democrats for Europe Party, European Free Alliance, European Green Party, European People's Party, Party of European Socialists, Volt Europa

=== Within the EU ===
- Austria: Austrian People's Party, Social Democratic Party of Austria, NEOS – The New Austria, The Greens – The Green Alternative, Volt Austria
- Belgium: Reformist Mouvement, Anders, Socialist Party, Vooruit, Christian Democratic and Flemish, Les Engagés, Ecolo, Green, Democratic Federalist Independent, Volt Belgium
- Bulgaria: We Continue the Change, Citizens for European Development of Bulgaria, Yes, Bulgaria!, Democrats for a Strong Bulgaria, Union of Democratic Forces, Bulgarian Socialist Party (factions), Volt Bulgaria, Republicans for Bulgaria, Stand Up.BG, United People's Party, Bulgaria for Citizens Movement, Movement 21
- Croatia: Croatian Democratic Union, Social Democratic Party of Croatia, Croatian Peasant Party, Istrian Democratic Assembly, Croatian People's Party – Liberal Democrats, Civic Liberal Alliance, People's Party – Reformists, Croatian Social Liberal Party, Centre
- Cyprus: Democratic Rally, Democratic Party, EDEK Socialist Party, Democratic Alignment, New Wave – The Other Cyprus, Volt Cyprus, Direct Democracy Cyprus
- Czech Republic: Mayors and Independents, Czech Pirate Party, KDU-ČSL, TOP 09, SEN 21, Green Party, Social Democracy, Volt Czech Republic
- Denmark: Social Democrats, Venstre, Moderates, Conservative People's Party, Danish Social Liberal Party, Volt Denmark
- Estonia: Estonian Reform Party, Estonian Social Democratic Party, Estonia 200, Isamaa, Estonian Greens, Left Alliance of Estonia
- Finland: National Coalition Party, Social Democratic Party of Finland, Centre Party, Green League, Swedish People's Party of Finland
- France: Renaissance, Democratic Movement, The Republicans, Socialist Party, Public Place, Radical Party of the Left, Europe Ecology – The Greens, The New Democrats, Génération.s, Radical Party, Union of Democrats and Independents, New Deal, Agir, En Commun, Horizons, Territories of Progress, Progressive Federation, Centrist Alliance, The Centrists, Ecologist Party, Democratic European Force, Volt France
- Germany: Christian Democratic Union, Social Democratic Party of Germany, Alliance 90/The Greens, Free Democratic Party, Christian Social Union in Bavaria, Die PARTEI, Volt Germany
- Greece: New Democracy, PASOK – Movement for Change, Syriza, Union of Centrists, Movement of Democratic Socialists, Volt Greece
- Hungary: Tisza Party, Democratic Coalition, Jobbik, Hungarian Socialist Party, Momentum Movement, Dialogue – The Greens' Party, LMP – Hungary's Green Party, Hungarian Liberal Party, New Start
- (Republic of Ireland) Ireland: Fianna Fáil, Fine Gael, Labour Party, Social Democrats, Green Party, Volt Ireland
- Italy: Democratic Party, Forza Italia, Italia Viva, Italian Left, More Europe, Volt Italy, Civic Commitment, Action, Italian Socialist Party, Social Democracy, Italian Republican Party, Solidary Democracy, Green Europe, Italian Radicals, Possible, Us of the Centre, Europeanists, Centrists for Europe, Moderates, Article One, European Republicans Movement, Forza Europa, Liberal Democratic Alliance for Italy, Alliance of the Centre, èViva, Sicilian Socialist Party, Team K, Us Moderates
- Latvia: Unity, The Progressives, For Latvia's Development, Movement For!, The Conservatives
- Lithuania: Homeland Union, Social Democratic Party of Lithuania, Liberals' Movement, Union of Democrats "For Lithuania", Freedom Party, Lithuanian Green Party
- Luxembourg: Christian Social People's Party, Luxembourg Socialist Workers' Party, Democratic Party, The Greens, Volt Luxembourg
- Malta: Nationalist Party, Labour Party (factions), AD+PD, Volt Malta
- Netherlands: Democrats 66, People's Party for Freedom and Democracy, Labour Party, Christian Democratic Appeal, GroenLinks, Volt Netherlands
- Poland: Civic Coalition, Poland 2050, Polish People's Party, New Left, Together Party, Your Movement, The Greens, Union of European Democrats, Polish Socialist Party, Volt Poland
- Portugal: Social Democratic Party, Socialist Party, Liberal Initiative, LIVRE, People–Animals–Nature Party, Volt Portugal
- Romania: Save Romania Union, National Liberal Party, Social Democratic Party, Democratic Alliance of Hungarians in Romania, People's Movement Party, Health Education Nature Sustainability Party, Renewing Romania's European Project, PRO Romania, Green Party, NOW Party, Volt Romania
- Slovakia: Progressive Slovakia, Christian Democratic Movement, Slovakia, Democrats, For the People, Voice – Social Democracy, Hungarian Alliance, Volt Slovakia
- Slovenia: Freedom Movement, New Slovenia, Social Democrats, Democrats. of Anže Logar, Slovenian People's Party, Vesna – Green Party, Volt Slovenia
- Spain: People's Party, Spanish Socialist Workers' Party, Sumar, Citizens, Volt Spain
- Sweden: Swedish Social Democratic Party, Moderate Party, Centre Party, Liberals, Christian Democrats, Volt Sweden

=== Outside the EU ===
- Albania: Democratic Party of Albania, Socialist Party of Albania, Freedom Party of Albania, Libra Party, Social Democratic Party of Albania, Republican Party of Albania, Unity for Human Rights Party, Party of the Vlachs of Albania, Volt Albania
- Armenia: Armenian Democratic Liberal Party, Armenian National Movement Party, Bright Armenia, Christian-Democratic Rebirth Party, Civil Contract, Conservative Party, European Party of Armenia, For The Republic Party, Free Democrats, Heritage, Liberal Democratic Union of Armenia, Meritocratic Party of Armenia, National Progress Party of Armenia, People's Party of Armenia, Republic Party, Rule of Law, Sasna Tsrer Pan-Armenian Party, Social Democrat Hunchakian Party, Sovereign Armenia Party, Union for National Self-Determination
- Belarus: Belarusian Christian Democracy, BPF Party, United Democratic Forces of Belarus, Party of Freedom and Progress, United Civic Party of Belarus, Belarusian Social Democratic Party (Assembly), Belarusian Social Democratic Assembly
- Bosnia and Herzegovina: Party of Democratic Action, Croatian Democratic Union of Bosnia and Herzegovina, Social Democratic Party of Bosnia and Herzegovina, Democratic Front, People and Justice, Party of Democratic Progress, Our Party, People's European Union, For New Generations, Union for a Better Future, Independent Bloc
- (Georgia (country)) Georgia: Ahali, Citizens, Droa, European Georgia, Federalists, For Georgia, For Justice, For the People, Free Democrats, Freedom Square, Georgian Labour Party, Girchi – More Freedom, Lelo, Movement for Social Democracy, National Democratic Party, Republican Party of Georgia, Solidarity Alliance of Georgia, Strategy Aghmashenebeli, Tavisupleba, United National Movement
- Iceland: Social Democratic Alliance, Liberal Reform Party
- Kazakhstan: Democratic Party of Kazakhstan
- Kosovo: Vetëvendosje, Alliance for the Future of Kosovo, Democratic League of Kosovo, Partia e Fortë, Volt Kosovo
- Moldova: Party of Action and Solidarity, National Alternative Movement, Liberal Party, European Social Democratic Party, Liberal Democratic Party, European People's Party, Pro Moldova, People's Party of the Republic of Moldova
- Montenegro: Europe Now!, Democratic Party of Socialists of Montenegro, Social Democratic Party of Montenegro, DEMOS, United Reform Action, Democratic Montenegro, Socialist People's Party, Liberal Party, Social Democrats, Bosniak Party, Civis, We won't give up Montenegro
- North Macedonia: VMRO-DPMNE, Social Democratic Union, Democratic Union for Integration, New Social Democratic Party, BESA, Alliance for Albanians, Liberal Democratic Party, VMRO-NP
- Norway: Conservative Party, Labour Party (factions), Liberal Party
- Russia: Yabloko, People's Freedom Party, Green Alternative, Russia of the Future, Democratic Party of Russia
- San Marino: Civic 10, Euro-Populars for San Marino, Future Republic, Party of Democrats, Party of Socialists and Democrats, Sammarineses for Freedom, Socialist Party, Union for the Republic
- Serbia: Party of Freedom and Justice, Democratic Party, Serbia Centre, Green–Left Front, Social Democratic Party of Serbia, Movement of Free Citizens
- Switzerland: Social Democratic Party of Switzerland (factions), Green Party of Switzerland (factions), Green Liberal Party of Switzerland, Volt Switzerland
- Turkey: New Party, Republican People's Party, Democracy and Progress Party, Democrat Party, Democratic Left Party, Good Party, Liberal Democratic Party
- Ukraine: Servant of the People, Fatherland, European Solidarity, Voice, Self Reliance, Ukrainian People's Party, Our Ukraine, European Party of Ukraine, People's Front, Ukrainian Democratic Alliance for Reform, Volt Ukraine
- United Kingdom: Liberal Democrats, Green Party of England and Wales, Scottish National Party (SNP), Social Democratic and Labour Party (SDLP), Scottish Greens,, Alliance Party of Northern Ireland,, Rejoin EU, Green Party Northern Ireland, Plaid Cymru, Mebyon Kernow, Alliance EPP: European People's Party UK, Volt UK, Animal Welfare Party

== Pro-EU newspapers and magazines ==
Note: Media outside of Europe may also be included.

- Denmark: Dagbladet Børsen, Politiken
- France: Le Figaro, Le Monde, Le Parisien
- Germany: Frankfurter Allgemeine Zeitung, Der Spiegel, Süddeutsche Zeitung, Der Tagesspiegel
- Hungary: Blikk
- (Republic of Ireland) Ireland: The Irish Times
- Italy: Corriere della Sera, la Repubblica, La Stampa, Dolomiten
- Japan: Chunichi Shimbun, Mainichi Shimbun
- Poland: Gazeta Wyborcza, Polityka
- South Korea: The Hankyoreh
- Spain: El Confidencial, El País, El Mundo
- United Kingdom: Financial Times, The Independent, The Guardian, The New European, The Economist

== Multinational European partnerships ==
- Council of Europe: an international organization whose stated aim is to uphold human rights, democracy, rule of law in Europe and to promote European culture. It has 46 member states.
- European Political Community: an intergovernmental forum for political and strategic discussions about the future of Europe.
- Organization for Security and Co-operation in Europe: the world's largest security-oriented intergovernmental organization, with 57 participating states mostly in Europe and the Northern Hemisphere.
- Paneuropean Union: the oldest European unification movement.

== See also ==
- Eastern Partnership
- Euromyth
- European Federalist Party
- European Federation
- European Union as an emerging superpower
- Europeanism
- Eurosphere
- Eurovoc
- Euronest Parliamentary Assembly
- Federal Europe
- Federalisation of the European Union
- Liberalism in Europe
- List of European federalist political parties
- Nationalism
- Pan-European identity
- Pan-Europeanism
- Politics of Europe
- Potential enlargement of the European Union
- Pulse of Europe Initiative
- Volt Europa
- WhyEurope
