= Nini Tsiklauri =

German actress

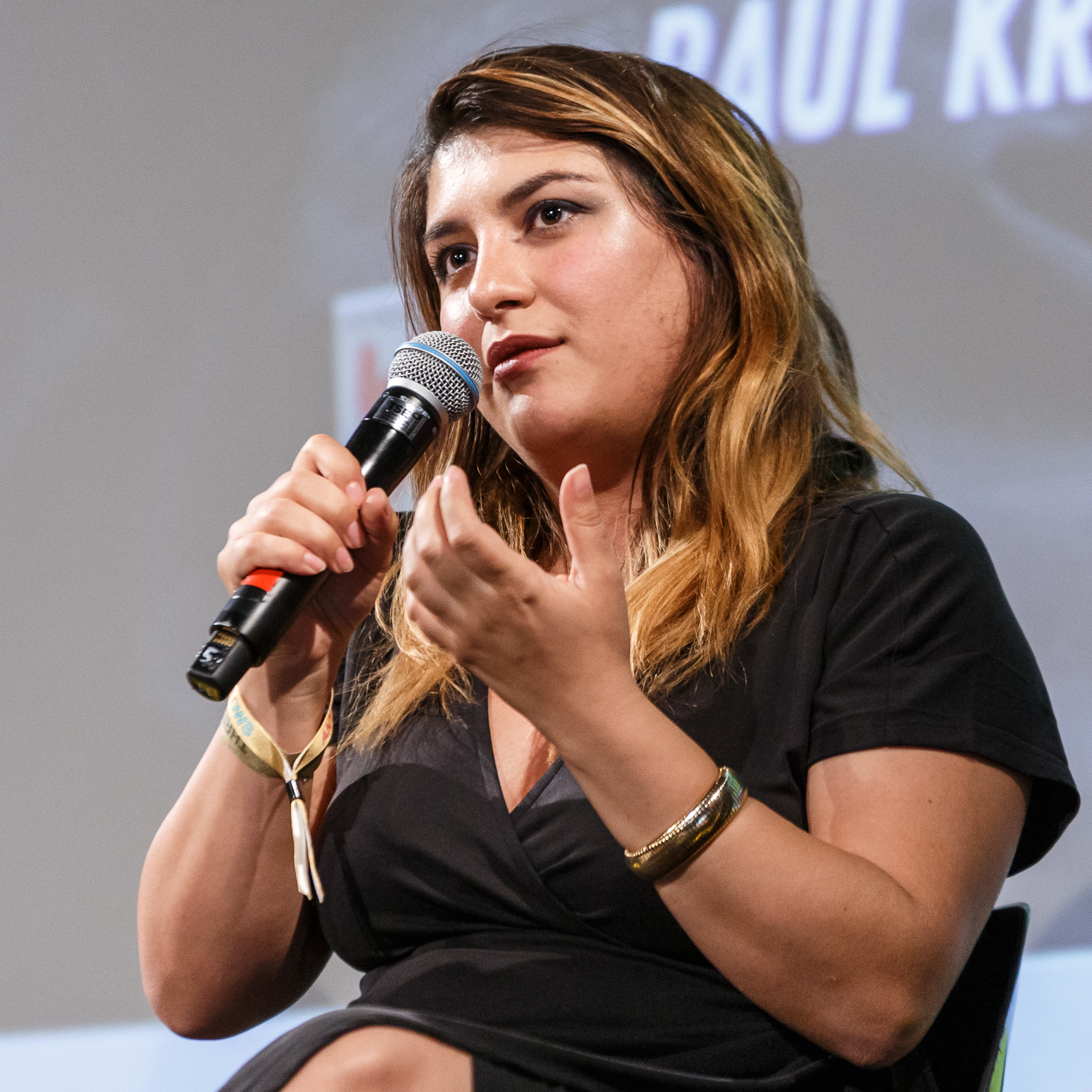
Nini Tsiklauri at the re:publica (2022)

Nini Tsiklauri (Georgian: ნინი წიკლაური; born July 26, 1992 in Tiflis, Georgia) is a German actress, musician, political activist, political scientist and author of Georgian origin.

== Biography ==
Tsiklauri grew up in Georgia, Hungary and, since 2002, in Germany. She graduated from the Neues Gymnasium in Bochum. She made her acting debut in 2006 in the cinema film Die Wilden Kerle 3 - Die Attacke der Biestigen Biester as Aisha. From 2007 to 2010, she played the role of Layla Farsad in the children's and youth series Schloss Einstein. In 2008, Tsiklauri sat on the jury of "KiKA Live - Best Actor Wanted". The song "Regenbogenzeit" (Rainbow Time) became more widely known through Schloss Einstein and was performed by her and her band from the series throughout Germany, including at the KiKA summer tour in 2010. In 2015, she founded the Voices of Volunteers choir as part of the Eurovision Song Contest 2015 and the Austrian TV programme "Die große Chance" on ORF eins.

Tsiklauri wrote the song "In My World" for the "Read for Tolerance" campaign at the 2010 German Reading Prize and is an ambassador for Fit am Ball Africa.

In 2008, she asked German Chancellor Angela Merkel at the Thuringia Future Conference for support for Georgia at the upcoming NATO summit in Bucharest. In the same year, she witnessed and documented the Caucasus War. In 2011 she received German citizenship. In 2012, Tsiklauri sang the Georgian national anthem at the official memorial service for the relatives of the war victims and the Georgian armed forces.

In 2015, she took part in the TV programme "Popstars" and came 17th.

Since 2014, Tsiklauri has been a member of the Young European Collective, a group of authors and activists from various European countries. In 2015, the group published her essay Who, If Not Us? in English. In 2017, the text was published in a German translation by the Droemer-Knaur publishing group under the title Wer, Wenn Nicht Wir? Four things we can do for Europe now.

In 2017, while studying, she founded Pulse of Europe Vienna and traveled through Austria to educate people about the EU. For the 2019 European elections in Austria, Nini Tsiklauri ran for fifth place on the list of NEOS – The New Austria and Liberal Forum. However, due to the election result, she did not enter the European Parliament.

In 2023, she joined Volt Europa and has been involved with Volt Austria ever since. For the 2024 European elections in Austria, she was supposed to be running as the top candidate in first place on the Volt list, but Volt failed to submit the necessary amount of petition signatures by the end of the deadline and is therefore not allowed to run.

== Filmography ==
- 2006: Die Wilden Kerle 3 (Role: Aisha, Biestiges Biest)
- 2008–2010: Schloss Einstein (Main role: Layla Farsad, 145 Folgen)
- 2015: Popstars

== Bibliography ==
- Wer, wenn nicht wir? Vier Dinge, die wir jetzt für Europa tun können. Droemer Knaur, Munich 2017. ISBN 978-3-426-78946-9.
- Re:thinking Europe – Positionen zur Gestaltung einer Idee. Verlag Holzhausen GmbH, Vienna 2018. ISBN 978-3-903207-15-8.
- Lasst uns um Europa kämpfen – Mit Liebe und Mut für eine neue EU. edition a, Vienna 2020. ISBN 978-3-99001-434-9.
