= DAGV =

'DAGV is a four-letter initialism which may refer to:

- Deutscher Automaten-Großhandels-Verband E.V., a German trade association and member of EUROMAT
- Diretório Acadêmico Getúlio Vargas the students office of the well known-Brazilian university Fundação Getúlio Vargas
