= List of European federalist political parties =

This is a list of political parties advocating for the Federalisation of the European Union and the creation of a Federal Europe.

== Pan-European parties ==
Party	Abbr.	Political Group	Ref.
European Federalist Party	EFP		
Volt Europa	Volt	Greens–European Free Alliance	

== By country ==
Country	Party	Abbr.	National Affiliation	European Affiliation	Ref.
Armenia	European Party of Armenia	EPA	United Platform of Democratic Forces		
Austria	NEOS – The New Austria and Liberal Forum	NEOS		Alliance of Liberals and Democrats for Europe Party	
Finland	Green League	Vihr		European Green Party	
France	Génération.s	G.s	New Popular Front	Democracy in Europe Movement 2025	
France	The Ecologists	EELV	New Popular Front	European Green Party	
Germany	Alliance 90/The Greens	Grüne		European Green Party	
Hungary	Democratic Coalition	DK	DK–MSZP–Dialogue Alliance	Party of European Socialists	
Italy	Partito Democratico	PD	Centre-left coalition	Party of European Socialists	
Italy	United States of Europe electoral list	SUE	Centre-left coalition	Alliance of Liberals and Democrats for Europe Party (+E, RI, LDE), European Democratic Party (IV, IC'è), Party of European Socialists (PSI)	
Netherlands	Democrats 66	D66		Alliance of Liberals and Democrats for Europe Party	
Romania	People's Movement Party	PMP	United Right Alliance	European People's Party	
Romania	Save Romania Union	USR	United Right Alliance	Alliance of Liberals and Democrats for Europe Party	
Sweden	The Liberals	L		Alliance of Liberals and Democrats for Europe Party	

== See also ==
- List of pro-European political parties
- List of Eurosceptic political parties
- Paneuropean Union
- Pro-Europeanism
- Union of European Federalists
