= Dino Madaudo =

Italian politician (born 1937)

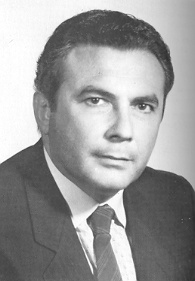

President of Social Democracy
- Incumbent
- Assumed office May 2022
- Preceded by: Office established

Personal details
- Born: 19 May 1937 (age 88) Messina, Kingdom of Italy
- Party: Social Democracy
- Other political affiliations: Italian Democratic Socialist Party

Dino Madaudo (born 19 May 1937) is an Italian accountant and politician who served at the Italian Parliament for four terms between 1979 and 1994. He was a member of the Italian Democratic Socialist Party (PSDI). He has been the president of a political party entitled Social Democracy since May 2022.

== Biography ==
Madaudo was born in Messina on 19 May 1937. He is a high school graduate and worked as an accountant. He was elected as a city councilor of Messina in 1979 and served in the post for several periods.

Madaudo was first elected to the Parliament in 1979 for the PSDI and served at the eighth term. He won his seat in the following three general elections and served at the Parliament until 1994. He was the head of the PSDI's parliamentary group between 25 May 1992 and 30 June 1992.

Madaudo was the undersecretary of state for finance in the cabinet of Ciriaco De Mita from 15 April 1988 to 21 July 1989. Madaudo held the same post in the sixth and seventh cabinets of Giulio Andreotti between 26 July 1989 and 27 June 1992. He also served as the undersecretary of defense in the coalition cabinet led by Giuliano Amato from 28 June 1992 to 28 April 1993.

Madaudo became the president of the Social Democracy in May 2022.
