= Volt Kosovo =

Albanian political movement

Volt Kosovo Volt Kosova (al), Волт Косово (sr)
- Abbreviation: Volt
- Headquarters: Prizren
- Ideology: European federalism Social liberalism Progressivism; Pro-Europeanism; Pan-Europeanism
- Political position: Centre
- European political alliance: Volt Europa
- Colours: Purple

Website
- www.voltkosovo.org

National sections of Volt Europa. The borders of the European Union are shown in red.

Volt Kosovo (Albanian: Volt Kosova, Serbian: Волт Косово , usually simply called Volt) is a social-liberal political movement in Kosovo. It is the Kosovar branch of Volt Europa, a political movement that operates on a European level.

== History ==
Although Kosovo is not an EU member state yet, Volt started activity in Kosovo in 2024. In addition to local involvement, members participate in Volt's European level events.
