= Pulse of Europe =

Citizen's initiative for pan-Europeanism

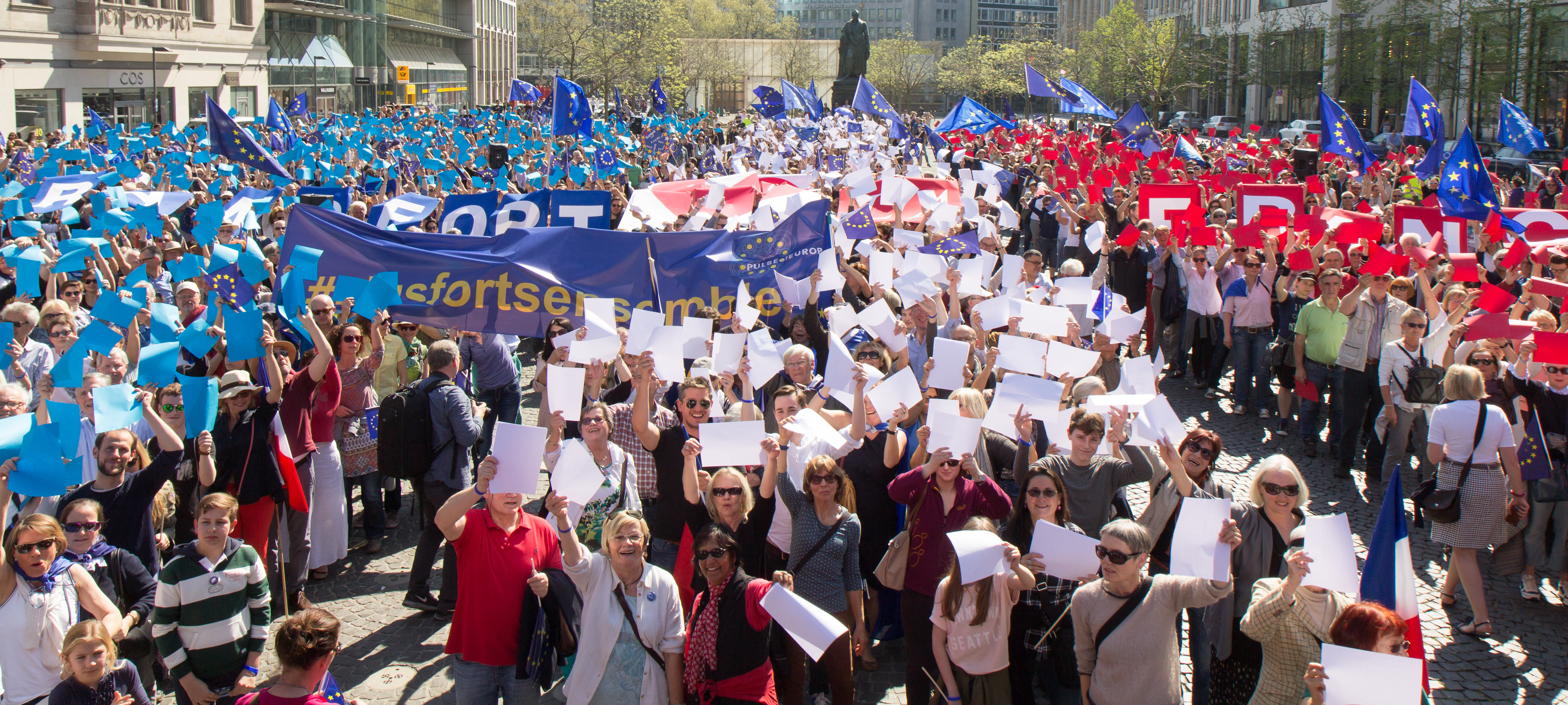
- Pulse of Europe public meeting in Frankfurt, Germany, 9 April 2017
- Formation: 9 November 2016; 9 years ago
- Founder: Daniel Röder, Sabine Röder
- Founded at: Frankfurt, Germany
- Type: Civil society campaign
- Legal status: Active
- Purpose: Pro-Europeanism
- Region served: Europe
- Methods: Nonviolent direct action
- Fields: Political movement
- Parent organisation: Pulse of Europe e.V.
- Website: pulseofeurope.eu

Pulse of Europe is a pro-European citizen's initiative, founded in Frankfurt, Germany by the end of 2016. It aims at "encouraging citizens of the European Union to speak out publicly in favour of a pan-European identity". As Europe is facing democratic deficits, as well as the growing popularity of right-wing populist and nationalist political parties, the initiative aims at counteracting euroscepticism. Pulse of Europe is organised in city groups, and has been active in over 130 cities in 20 European countries. Pulse of Europe is registered as an association (e. V.) headquartered in Frankfurt, but city groups are largely self-organised.

== Basic principles and goals ==
Pulse of Europe refers to ten basic principles which guide their actions:

1. Europe must not fail: the initiative perceives the very idea of the European Union to be at stake in case of eurosceptic parties prevailing in the upcoming national elections. It appeals to pro-European citizens to promote and support the European idea in public, and vote accordingly.
2. The threat to peace: the European Union is seen as the main warrantor of peace in Europe. Therefore, the union must not fail.
3. We are responsible: all parts of the society are regarded as responsible to counteract any attempts at dividing the union.
4. Get up and vote: adopting the idea of the existence of a "silent majority" of pro-European citizens, the initiative calls for voting for pro-European parties.
5. Basic rights and Rule of law are inviolable: on the background of recent attempts to restrict by law the freedom of the press in single member states of the Union "individual freedom, justice and the Rule of law must be maintained in all of Europe."
6. European fundamental freedoms are not negotiable: the European basic freedoms are seen as historical achievements, transforming single national states into one community. A balance of legal rights and duties must be maintained in all countries of Europe.
7. Reforms are necessary: the European idea must be reformed in order to secure and strengthen the ongoing support of the Union by the people of Europe.
8. Take mistrust seriously: any concerns regarding the Union are to be taken seriously, and solutions have to be found, in order to restore the trust towards the future of Europe.
9. Diversity and joint qualities: maintaining the European identity includes the preservation of its regional and national diversity, which is understood as an enrichment.
10. We all can, and should be a part of it: Pulse of Europe regards itself as an initiative which remains independent from any religious or political conviction, dedicated to the preservation of the European civil society.

== Foundation and development ==
The citizen's initiative was founded by the German lawyers Daniel and Sabine Röder. Using their private network of friends and social media, they held a first public meeting in Frankfurt, Germany, by the end of November 2016. Initially attracting about 200 attendants, further demonstrations followed at weekly intervals from January 2017 onwards. The initiative spread from Frankfurt to other German towns and other European cities outside Germany. In preparation of the elections in the Netherlands on 12 March 2017, the demonstrations adopted the campaign and its accompanying slogan "Blijf bij ons" of the pro-European initiative WhyEurope.

On 5 March 2017, public meetings were held in 35 European cities. 28 of these were German, but citizens also met in Amsterdam, the French cities of Paris, Strasbourg, Montpellier, Toulouse, and Lyon, and in the English city of Bath. On 12 March 2017, more than 20,000 people joined demonstrations in more than 40 European cities. Until May 2018 the number of participating cities rose to 118 in 18 European countries, but public attention and attendance declined after the elections in the Netherlands, France, and Germany had taken place. In 2019, Pulse of Europe associated with the German School strike for climate initiative.

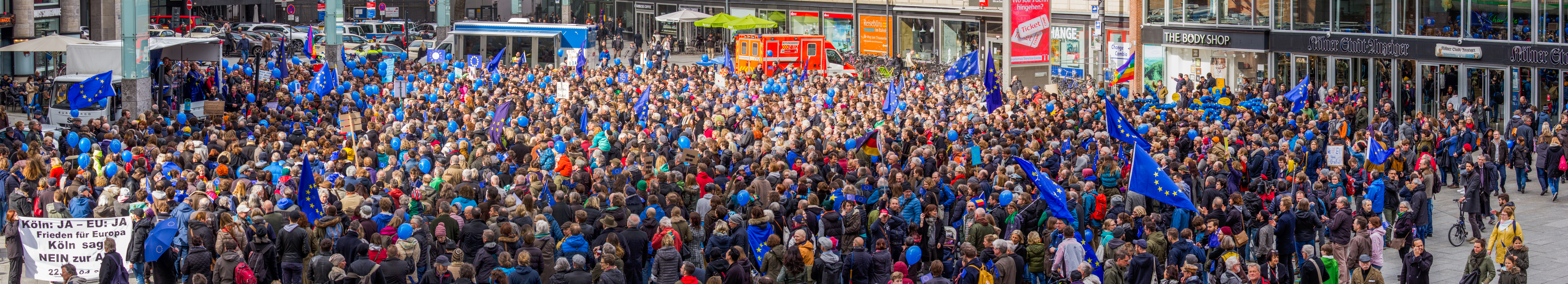
Pulse of Europe in Cologne, 19 March 2017

=== Further development ===
After peaking in 2017, attendance at Pulse of Europe’s weekly rallies gradually declined. The movement increasingly shifted its focus from street protests to project-based and long-term civic participation. In 2018, it launched the European HouseParliaments, a dialogue format that brings small groups together to discuss current EU issues and forward their findings to political decision-makers.

In the years that followed, Pulse of Europe initiated further projects, including the LGBTI campaign PrideofEurope, the participation project #Bestof49 in the aftermath of the Conference on the Future of Europe, and the Europe-wide #NoVeto campaign advocating the abolition of unanimity in the Council. Ahead of the European elections in 2019 and again in 2024, as well as the German federal elections in 2021 and 2025, the movement organized campaigns combining established formats such as the EUROMAT, open letters, and creative participatory actions.In doing so, Pulse of Europe evolved from a pure protest movement into a civic platform for European citizen engagement and political reform initiatives.

== Initiatives and Campaigns ==
=== European HouseParliaments ===
Since 2018, Pulse of Europe has been developing new participation formats to actively involve citizens in European debates and ensure their voices are heard. This gave rise to the European House Parliaments (EHP), a project offering citizens a simple and effective way to discuss Europe’s future, contribute ideas, and help shape policy directly. By September 2025, ten rounds had been completed, and the project continues to grow. A key role in designing and advancing the EHP was played by Raban Fuhrmann, whose expertise and commitment were instrumental to its success. An EHP is a small discussion round on European policy issues, usually involving four to eight participants. Meetings can take place flexibly, in private living rooms, pubs, or public spaces. The aim is to provide citizens with a structured way to express their views on European issues, contributing both to opinion-building and to strengthening Europe’s civil society. The guiding motto: “From the sofa to the streets” moving from private discussions to visible civic engagement.

Topics are developed based on suggestions from the public. After review and selection, Pulse of Europe creates a starter kit containing detailed instructions, a clearly formulated discussion question, a collection of pro and con arguments, and background information. Each question focuses on a controversial European policy issue, for example: “How desirable do you consider the introduction of a unified EU-level healthcare system?”

The results of all EHPs in one round are collected, aggregated, scientifically analyzed, and condensed into a joint snapshot. This is forwarded to politicians, called dialogue partners, who have agreed in advance to comment publicly on the proposals. In this way, the project strengthens dialogue between civil society and decision-makers and contributes directly to shaping European public opinion.

Another key feature of the EHP is the direct exchange with high-level EU officials. Results are not only submitted in writing but also presented in live events and webinars, where EU representatives respond directly. This creates a dialogue-based feedback process, increases the transparency of decision-making, and makes citizen participation visible.

=== Pride of Europe ===
Pride of Europe is a campaign launched in 2019 in response to growing discrimination, particularly in Eastern and Southeastern Europe. Since then, Pulse of Europe has supported LGBTI and human rights initiatives. The creation of so-called “LGBTI-free zones” in Poland and Hungary’s 2021 anti-LGBTI law restricting young people’s access to information highlighted the urgency of action. While some Polish regions later repealed the status under EU pressure and Hungary’s referendum to validate the law failed in 2022, the situation for LGBTI communities in both countries remains difficult.

The EU’s motto, “United in Diversity,” explicitly includes the rights of minorities such as lesbians, gay men, bisexual, trans, and intersex people. For decades, the EU has been a driving force for LGBTI equality, the first international organization to officially recognize discrimination based on sexual orientation or gender identity. It set a global standard: LGBTI rights are human rights.

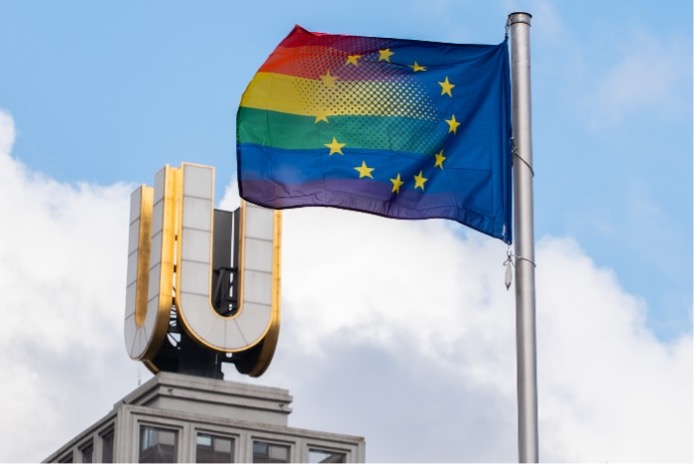
Pride of Europe flag

As part of the campaign, David Hoffmann designed a European rainbow flag for Pulse of Europe. A Kickstarter crowdfunding campaign raised €28,000 to bring the flag to Pride parades in Eastern and Southeastern Europe in solidarity with LGBTI communities. The COVID-19 pandemic, however, forced cancellations in 2020 and 2021. Instead, Pulse of Europe launched the petition “To Poland with Love” with the NGO Allout, calling on European cities to show solidarity with minorities in Polish “LGBTI-free zones.” Over 70,000 people signed.

In May 2021, during Europe Week, the rainbow flag was flown at town halls, city parliaments, and central sites across Europe. Nineteen cities, together with 55 partner cities in 13 EU countries and the UK, took part.

=== German Federal Election 2021 ===
For the 2021 federal election, Pulse of Europe launched the campaign “Gute Wahl” (“Good Choice”) to highlight European issues in Germany’s election debate. The message: many major political challenges can only be solved at the European level. This was symbolically underlined by European citizens wishing German voters a “good choice,” emphasizing how closely national and European politics are intertwined.

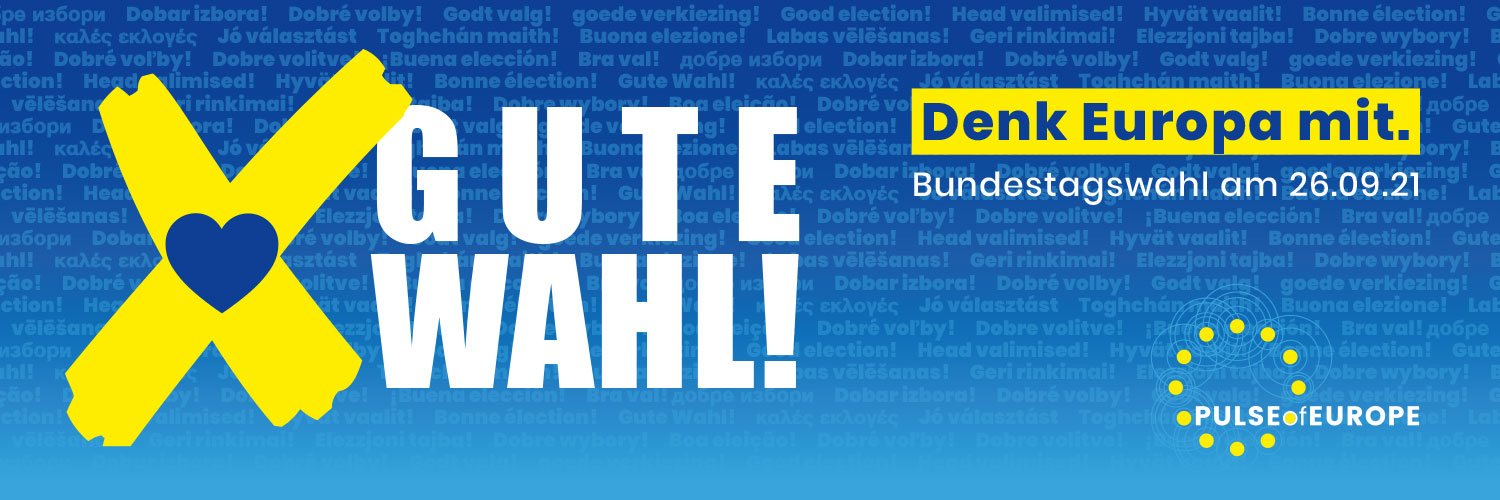
Good choice campaign

The campaign featured public events, digital actions, and citizen materials. A toolkit with talking points, poster templates, and social media content helped spread the pro-European message locally.

A central tool was the newly developed EUROMAT, an interactive voting compass first used in the 2021 federal election. Unlike conventional voting aids, it emphasized the European dimension of national politics, helping users compare their views on EU-related questions with the positions of German parties. The message: a vote that strengthens Europe is always a “good choice” for Germany. This ensured that European issues remained visible in the national election context.

=== Ambassador of the European Citizens' Initiative ===
Since 2023, Pulse of Europe has served as an official ambassador of the European Citizens’ Initiative (ECI) within the European Commission’s ECI Ambassador Programme. Its goal: increase visibility and awareness of the ECI and encourage more citizens to use it.

The ECI, introduced by the Lisbon Treaty in 2009 and in force since April 2012, is the EU’s most powerful instrument of participatory democracy. It allows citizens to formally request that the European Commission propose legislation on matters within EU competence.

As a nonpartisan pro-European movement, Pulse of Europe works to strengthen democratic participation at the EU level. As an ambassador, it explains the ECI, supports ongoing initiatives, organizes info events, and motivates citizens to get involved, through signatures, debates, or even their own initiatives. For Pulse of Europe, the principle is clear: Europe must not be an elite project; it depends on citizen engagement.

=== European Election Campaign 2024: Defend the Heart of Europe ===
Ahead of the 2024 European elections, Pulse of Europe launched the campaign “Defend the Heart of Europe—with Your Vote.” Its aim was to boost turnout and mobilize pro-European voices. Framed against a backdrop of “polycrises”, climate, pandemic, war, and polarization, the campaign set a target of surpassing 50% turnout across the EU. Ultimately, turnout reached 51% EU-wide and over 64% in Germany, about three percentage points higher than in 2019.

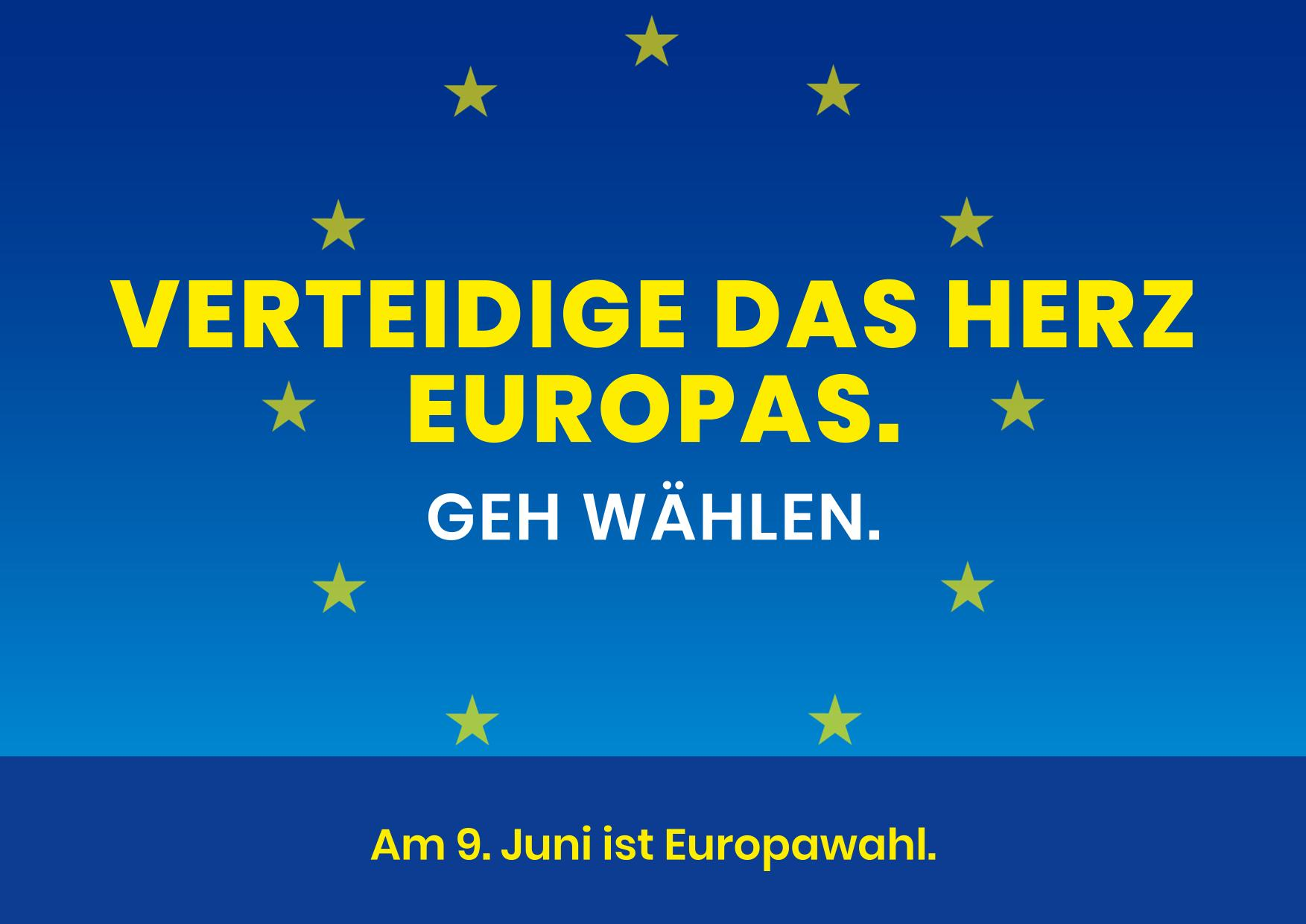
Defend the HEart of Europe campaign

The campaign featured a strong visual identity, concise messaging (supported by prominent public figures), active social media presence, and materials for citizens. Staying nonpartisan, Pulse of Europe appealed to all pro-European groups, particularly first-time voters from age 16. Again, the EUROMAT was central, this time on a pan-European scale. Users compared their positions on issues like climate policy, asylum, and social policy with those of European party families (EPP, S&D, Greens/EFA, ALDE). Unlike national voting tools, this highlighted cross-border perspectives and was available in multiple languages. Prominent supporters included actor Daniel Brühl, journalist Dunja Hayali, former football coach Joachim Löw, and several Members of the European Parliament. Their statements, videos, and event appearances gave the campaign greater reach.

=== #Bestof49, Federal Election 2025, #NoVeto ===
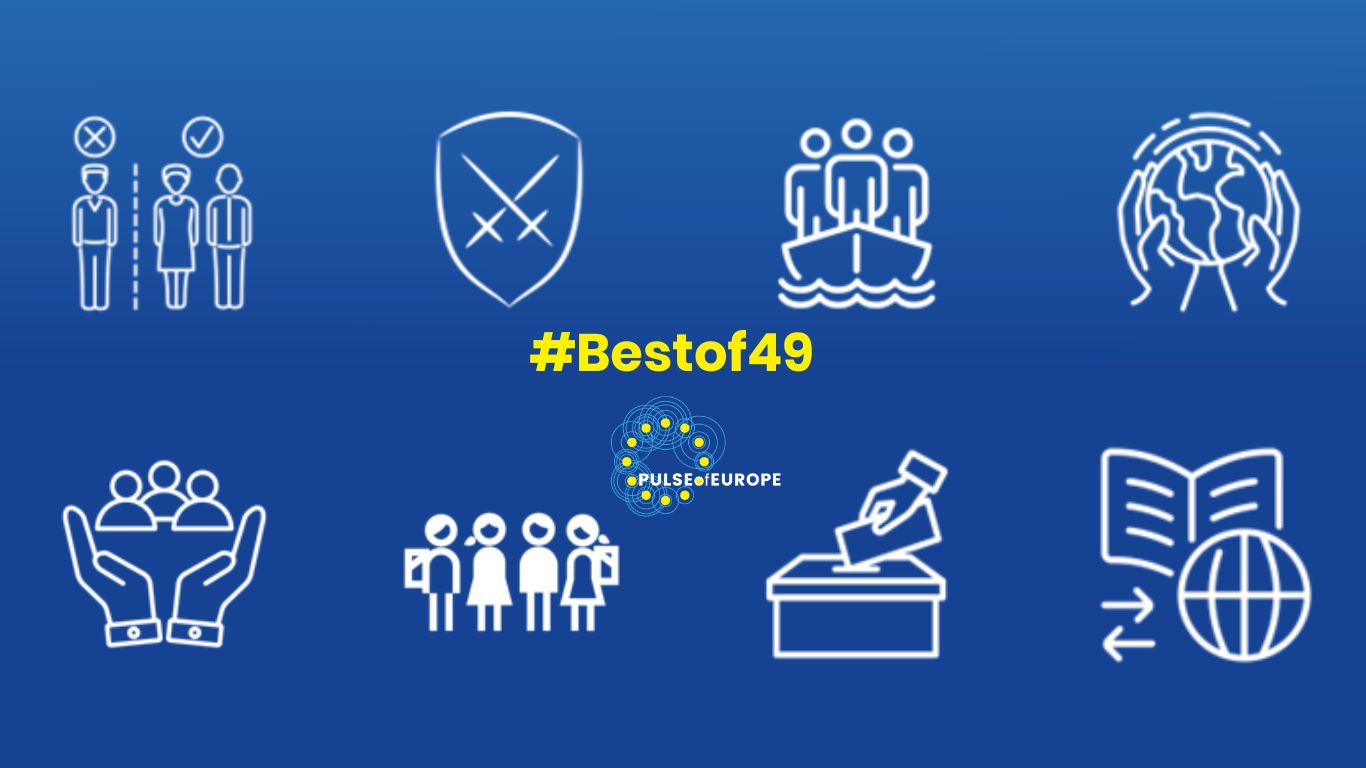
#Bestof49 campaign logo

During the Conference on the Future of Europe (2021–2022), citizens from all member states developed 49 reform proposals on democracy, rule of law, climate, digitalization, migration, and social policy. On behalf of Germany, Stephanie Hartung, lawyer and deputy chair of Pulse of Europe, took part in the plenary as a national citizen delegate, working with EU representatives and citizens from across Europe. She later called the conference a landmark experiment in European democracy. Pulse of Europe launched the campaign #Bestof49 to promote a selection of key proposals, including:abolishing unanimity in the EU Council, creating a common EU asylum and defense policy, implementing ambitious climate action under the Green Deal, introducing compulsory “European Studies” in schools.

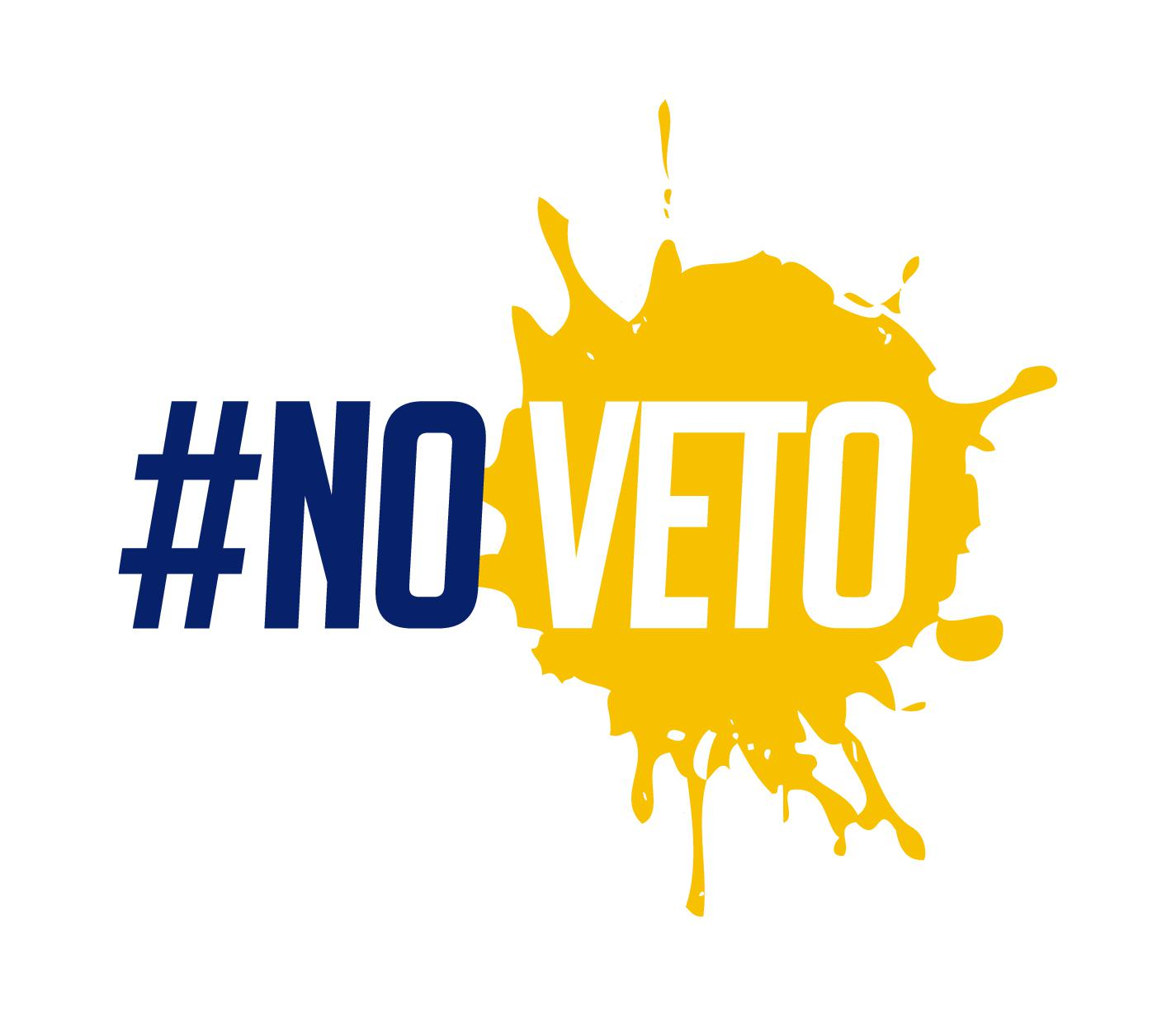
#Noveto campaign logo

In January 2025, Pulse of Europe published an open letter to all federal election candidates, stressing that “Bundestag elections are European elections too” and urging them to adopt the citizen proposals. In August 2025, after the election, a second open letter was sent to newly elected members of the Bundestag and European Parliament, calling for action on the eight priority #Bestof49 points. A central demand was abolishing unanimity in the EU Council. Since 2023, Pulse of Europe has pursued this goal through the #NoVeto campaign, arguing that veto rights paralyze EU decision-making in foreign policy, taxation, and rule of law. The campaign seeks broad support for reform to make the Union more resilient and democratic. Pulse of Europe organizes events, debates, provides information, and cooperates with other pro-European groups to keep the issue on the agenda.

With #Bestof49, #NoVeto, and the open letters around the 2025 election, Pulse of Europe positions itself as both a voice for citizen proposals and a driver of institutional reform in the EU.
