= SEN 21 and Volt =

Czech Eurofederalist electoral alliance founded in 2023

SEN 21 and Volt SEN 21 a Volt
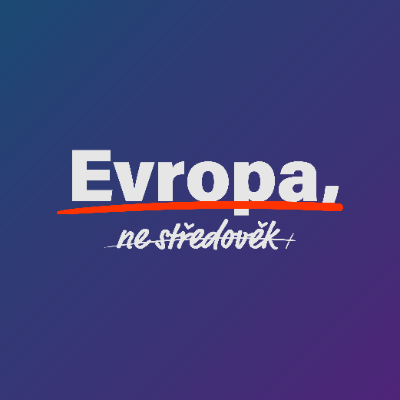
- Abbreviation: SEN 21 a Volt
- Leader: Lenka Helena Koenigsmark
- Founded: 5 October 2023
- European affiliation: European Democratic Party; Volt Europe
- Colours: Blue-to-purple gradient
- Slogan: Evropa, ne středověk! (Europe, not the Middle Ages!)
- European Parliament: 0 / 21

Website
- www.zvolsievropu.cz

SEN 21 and Volt (Czech: SEN 21 a Volt) is a Czech electoral alliance formed between the liberal SEN 21 movement and Volt Czechia, a chapter of Volt Europa, founded for the 2024 European Parliament election.

== Ideology ==
The alliance describes itself as liberal and strongly pro-European, and states that it seeks to present "an alternative for voters disappointed with the government of Petr Fiala". As its foremost priorities, the alliance has named the creation of a united European army, opposition to dual pricing and support of the European economy. Volt also mentioned anti-money laundering measures, regional development, and LGBTQ+ equality as priorities.

Lenka Helena Koenigsmark, the leader of the joint list and former marketing director of Mattel, said she wanted to make the European Union "more sexy" and "safer and stronger". She said the joint list supports the introduction of Euro and opposes the requirement for unanimous voting in the European Council.

SEN 21 and Volt were one of two lists in the 2024 European election in the Czech Republic which expressed support for European federalism, along with the Liberal Alliance of Independent Citizens.

== Composition ==
Parties	Main ideology	Leader(s)	List composition
SEN 21	Liberalism	Lenka Helena Koenigsmark	16 / 26
Volt Czechia	European federalism	Adam Hanka	10 / 26

== Election results ==
=== European Parliament ===
Election	List leader	Votes	%	Seats	+/−	EP Group
2024	Lenka Helena Koenigsmark	9,955	0.34 (#15)	0 / 21	New	−
