= Voltage (disambiguation) =

Voltage is the term for the difference in electrical potential energy.

Voltage may also refer to:

== Companies ==
- Voltage (company), a Japanese app developer
- Voltage Pictures, a film financing, production, and distribution company

== Other uses ==
- Mountain Dew Voltage, a variant of the soft drink Mountain Dew
- "Voltage" (song), a 2022 song by Itzy
- Sarine Voltage (born 1959), American musician
- Rob Cross (darts player) (born 1990), English professional darts player nicknamed "Voltage"
- Voltage, Oregon, United States, an unincorporated community

== See also ==
- Spannungen ("Tensions" or "Voltages"), an annual summer festival for chamber music in Heimbach, North Rhine-Westphalia, Germany
- High Voltage (disambiguation)
