= Social Democracy (Italy, 2022) =

Minor political party in Italy

Social Democracy Socialdemocrazia
- Abbreviation: SD
- Secretary: Umberto Costi
- President: Antonio Esposito
- Founded: 2 July 2022
- Preceded by: Italian Democratic Socialist Party
- Headquarters: Rome
- Ideology: Social democracy
- Political position: Centre/Centre-left
- National affiliation: Action – Italia Viva
- Colours: Red

Website
- socialdemocratici.it

Social Democracy (Italian: Socialdemocrazia, SD) is a social-democratic political party in Italy, established in 2022. It considers itself to be the continuation of the historical Italian Democratic Socialist Party (PSDI), established in 1947.

== History ==
=== Foundation and early years ===
In the July 2022 "Social Democracy" (SD), a new party in the tradition of the old PSDI, was established. In the same month the party held its first national conference during which Umberto Costi was appointed secretary, Dino Madaudo president and Magistro honorary president. In addition to several former activists from the PSDI, the new party was joined by Antonio Matasso, leader of the Sicilian Socialist Party, which became the regional secretary of the party in Sicily. Magistro would return to the PSDI by 2023.

SD, which initially wanted to contest the 2022 Italian general election as part of the centre-left, enlarged to include centrist individuals, favoured the autonomy of its regional sections and aimed to promote a new socialist constituent assembly. Finally, in the run-up of the general election, the party joined forces with Italia Viva and Action, aiming to represent the left wing of the Action – Italia Viva electoral list. In the 2024 European Parliament election the party supported the United States of Europe electoral list.

During the 2025 national congress, Costi was confirmed secretary and Antonio Esposito was elected president.

== Ideology ==
The party adheres to the ideas of social democracy and democratic socialism. As a supporter of internationalism and pro-Europeanism, the party is committed to maintaining Italy in the geopolitical cadre of advanced liberal democracies.

== Leadership ==
- Secretary: Umberto Costi (2022–present)
- President: Dino Madaudo (2022–2025), Antonio Esposito (2025–present)
- Honorary President: Mimmo Magistro (2022)

== Election results ==
=== European Parliament ===
| Election | Leader | Votes | % | Seats | +/– | EP Group |
|---|---|---|---|---|---|---|
| 2024 | Umberto Costi | Into USE | | 0 / 76 | New | – |
