= WhyEurope =

European Non-profit organization

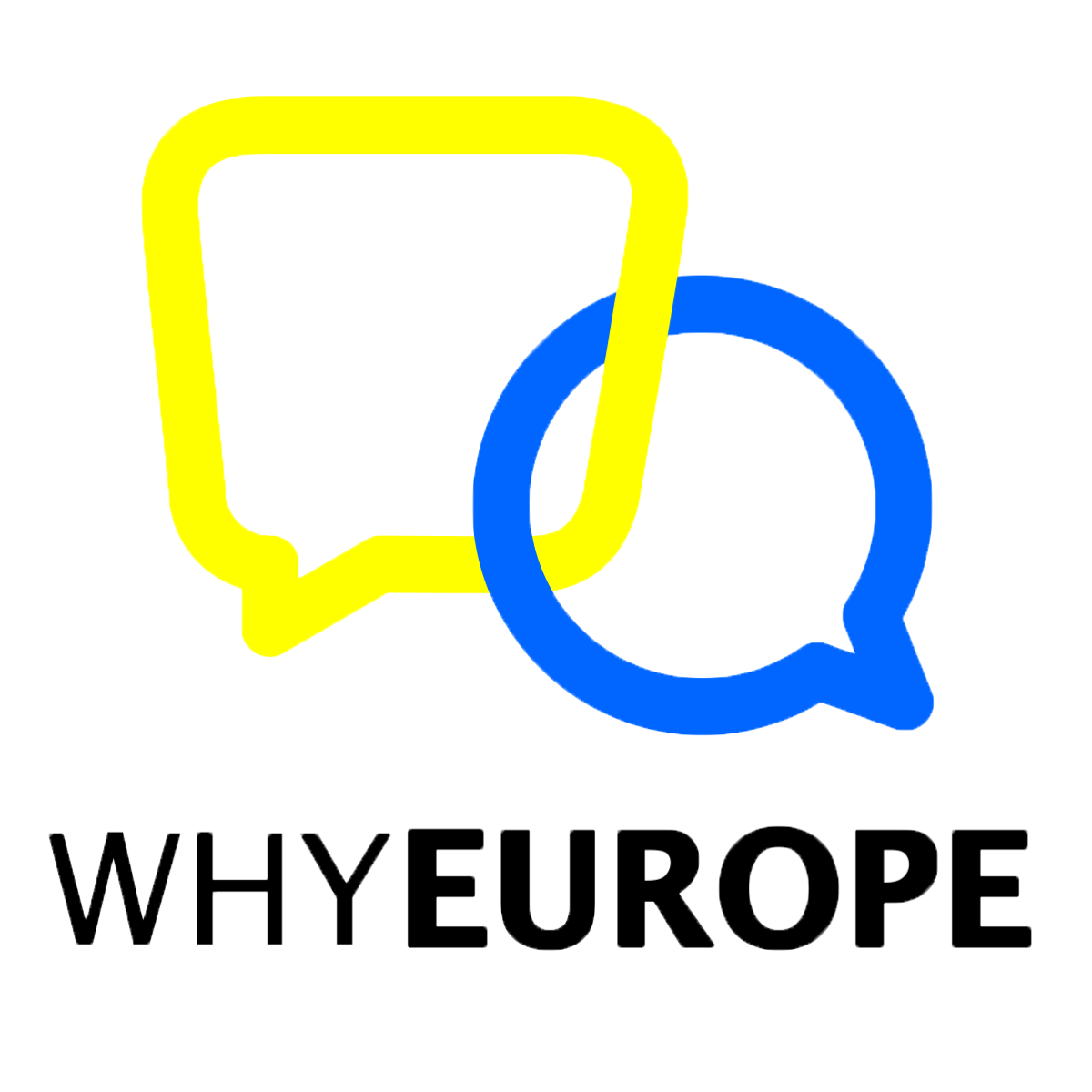
- Formation: July 2016, registered September 2017
- Legal status: Registered non-profit organization ("eingetragener Verein")
- Headquarters: Tübingen, Germany
- Members: 30

WhyEurope is a non-partisan and independent non-profit organization, which was founded in 2016 in Freiburg im Breisgau, Germany. Since September 2017, WhyEurope is an officially registered association based in Tübingen, Germany. It has approximately 30 members from over 10 European states.

== Background and history ==
The initiative was founded by three students, who shared a concern about the rise of euro-scepticism and right-wing-populism. The outcome of the Brexit referendum was the trigger for them to become active. They decided to publish pictures with simple pro-European messages on Facebook, Twitter and Instagram.

== Communication style ==
WhyEurope has adopted a communication style they refer to as “Positive Populism”. The founders describe the approach as simple, emotional and personal. They refrain from including difficult, political or legal terms in their slogans and make their messages as catchy and short as possible. WhyEurope trigger positive emotions in their audience by connecting political issues to every-day topics such as love or happiness. They believe that Positive Populism is to be seen as a simple and emotional communication style, but sustains a foundation of hard facts and evidence. In contrary to actual negative populists, they want to provide factual evidence and explanations for their claims.

WhyEurope considers Positive Populism an approach to opposing current populist and extremist movements.

== Independence ==
Since their foundation, Why Europe has emphasized their character as a non-partisan and independent initiative. Despite being in contact with actors of the European Union, they have stated their distance to the EU institutions.

== Relationship to other initiatives ==
WhyEurope has had a number of cooperation with other pro-European initiatives. Since beginning of 2016, Benedikt Kau and Hans-Christoph Schlüter were in contact with Daniel Röder and Sabine Röder when they launched the demonstrations under the name Pulse of Europe. Pulse of Europe adopted the campaign and the slogan of the campaign “Blijf bij ons” focusing on the Dutch General elections. Together, the initiatives mobilized ten thousands of people joining pro-European demonstrations.

Further cooperation included projects with the Young European Federalists and Laute Europäer.

== Reception ==
On 31 January, Marine Le Pen (Front National) filed a parliamentary request in the European Parliament asking about the funding of WhyEurope through the European Commission. Commissioner Günther Oettinger, then responsible person for the EU budget, replied that the Commission has not funded WhyEurope in any way and the name were not found within the central accounting system.

When EURACTIV first discovered the WhyEurope Twitter account a few days ago, we were puzzled by the freshness of the pro-European messages, in stark contrast to the EU’s usually boring official communications.

— Georgi Gotev, Senior Editor at Euractiv

November 2017, WhyEurope has been awarded European Public Communication Award by the European Committee Of The Regions. The prize was received during the EuroPCom in the hemicycle of the European Parliament.

In May 2018, WhyEurope was awarded the Arno-Esch-Preis by the Association of Liberal Academics in Germany.
