= Volt Poland =

Polish pro-European political movement

Volt Poland Volt Polska
- Abbreviation: Volt
- Co-leaders: Maciej Tadeusiak; Ulyana Bakhtsizina
- Registered: 5 February 2024 (As an association)
- Headquarters: Długa 29, 00-238, Warsaw
- Ideology: European federalism Social liberalism Progressivism; Pro-Europeanism
- Political position: Centre to centre-left
- European political alliance: Volt Europa
- Colours: Purple

Website
- Volt Polska

Volt Poland (Polish: Volt Polska, abbreviated mononymously as Volt) is a pro-European, social liberal political movement in Poland, constituting the Polish subsidiary of Volt Europa, a federalist European political alliance. The movement advocates for deeper European integration and promotes evidence-based policy making, pragmatic governance and the adoption of best practices from other EU countries and municipalities.

Volt Poland operates through the Association Volt Poland (Polish: Stowarzyszenie Volt Polska), which regularly organises open meet-ups in Warsaw, Kraków and Katowice, welcoming anyone interested in participating via their social media. Despite this, Volt Poland is not a registered political party as of November 2026.

== History ==
National sections of Volt Europa. The borders of the European Union are shown in red.

Logo of Volt Poland in January of 2019

First activities of the group emerged in late 2017, mostly active on social media as a Polish subsidiary of Volt Europa's early campaigns, centering itself as being a "pan-european progressive force" in Poland. Despite having aimed at participating in the 2019 European parliament election, it failed to do so. The group did not participate in the 2019 Polish parliamentary election, but congratulated the Polish Greens on entering the Sejm.

October 16th, 2023 Laurens Dassen of Volt Netherlands was in contact with Volt Poland about the 2023 Polish parliamentary election. He expressed concern that the representative of Volt Poland felt “uncomfortable” speaking on the phone in public about the elections, which emphasised for Dassen how important these elections were. Dassen expressed relief that democratic candidates in Poland could win the elections after years of undemocratic ruling of Law and Justice (PiS).

In early 2024, the group was formally registered as "Association Volt Poland"(Polish: Stowarzyszenie Volt Polska). The first board consisted of three elected members: two co-chairs (which Volt calls co-presidents) and one treasurer.

During the 2025 Polish presidential election Volt Poland did not have a representative running for president. After the 1st voting round, Volt Poland recommended to vote for Rafał Trzaskowski during the 2nd voting round, citing his pro-European views. (Note: Additionally, on behalf of Volt Europa, the member of the European Parliament and member of Volt Netherlands Reinier van Lanschot expressed the organization's support for Rafał Trzaskowski during the second election round between Rafał Trzaskowski and Karol Nawrocki.)

During its General Assembly on 28th March 2026 in Warsaw, a new board was elected by the members of the association: two co-presidents, one treasurer, and two non-executive board members. Additionally, three members of the internal audit committee (Komisja Rewizyjna) were voted for by the members of Volt Polska.

In 2026, Volt Poland co-chair Maciej Tadeusiak expressed his support for the SDPL candidate Sławomir Pietrzyk for the Kraków mayoral election. Later in the same year, the organization began attempts at formally registering itself as a political party with the help from Volt Europa, running a media campaign collecting signatures. The collection officially lasted until November 13 of 2026.

== Initiatives ==
=== Local initiatives ===
Volt Poland regularly organises open meet-ups in Warsaw, Kraków and Katowice, welcoming anyone interested in participating via their social media.

March 29th 2025, Volt Poland co-organised an event about health care in Poland. The event was about ways to understand people’s needs, sharing experiences with local Polish institutions and comparing European health care systems.

June 14th 2025, Volt Poland was present during the Equality Parade (Warsaw) at the “Pride village”.

=== Cross border initiatives ===
Volt Poland supports other Volt representative during their national elections and Elections to the European Parliament. For example, during the 2025 elections in Germany, members of Volt Poland crossed the border to support Volt Germany with collecting signatures and campaigning.

When Germany started temporary border controls, Volt organised a protest in Schengen, Luxembourg together with Young European Federalists (JEF) to express the importance of the Schengen Agreement for the European economy and social life. For this protest, they used the slogan “Don’t touch my Schengen” from the organisation Young European Federalists (JEF). JEF started this campaign in 2016, to raise awareness of the Schengen agreement when politicians on national level plan to start border controls.

July 19th 2025, Volt organised protests in 9 border regions of Germany Volt Poland organised a protest in the border region Frankfurt Oder and Słubice. The route of the protest march was adjusted when the municipality of Słubice did not allow the protesters to cross the border to Słubice. The given reasons to prohibit the continuation of the protest on the Polish side of the border, were a risk of counter protesters, social tensions, disrupting the work of border control agents, and the concern that the police could not guarantee the safety of the protesters and other people in Słubice. After the protest in Frankfurt Oder, Volt Poland joined an alternative event that was organised by the municipality of Słubice: the 4th Słubice-Frankfurt Civic Picnic.

== Goals ==
Goals of the Volt Polska association are formally registered at Krajowy Rejestr Sądowy (KRS), the Polish public registry where basic data of organisations and companies are registered and maintained by the Ministry of Justice (Poland). The organization also aims to register itself as a political party, requiring a thousand valid signatures. Most of the association's goals overlap with Volt Europa and Volt There:

- Make a transnational voting ballot during EU elections.
- Reforming the European Union, closer to federalized model.

Additionally, the Volt Polska association claims to have more specific goals:

- Keeping Schengen borders open, notably between Germany and Poland.
- Liberalization of abortion laws up to 12th week of pregnancy.
- Equalizing the retirement age at 63.

== See also ==
- European political party
- European Federalist Movement
- Young European Federalists
- Pan-European identity
- European values
- Pro-Europeanism
- Euroscepticism
- Democracy in Europe Movement 2025
- Akcja Demokracja
