= Volt Ukraine =

Volt Ukraine Вольт Україна
- Leaders: Ksenia Yarysh; Seraphim Kolodchuk
- Founder: Mykhaylo Pobigay
- Founded: June 2022; 3 years ago
- Membership: 12 (2022)
- Ideology: Social liberalism Progressivism; Pro-Europeanism
- Political position: Centre to centre-left
- European political alliance: Volt Europa
- Colours: Purple
- Verkhovna Rada: 0 / 450
- Regions: 0 / 43,122

Website
- voltukraine.org

Volt Ukraine (Ukrainian: Вольт Україна, romanized: Volʹt Ukrayina, abbreviated Volt) is a social-liberal political party in Ukraine. It is the Ukrainian branch of Volt Europa, a political movement that operates on a European level.

== History ==
Volt Ukraine was founded in June 2022 by Mykhaylo Pobigay, who also initially served as chairman. In a post on the Volt Germany website, Pobigay said:

We Ukrainians feel European. Volt gives us the opportunity to be part of the European family and help shape European politics. Here our voice is heard! In these difficult times of war we are fighting for a common European future and all of Volt Europe stands by our side.

In September 2023, Pobigay spoke at the Volt Netherlands Congress in The Hague.

In January 2024, Pobigay stepped down from leadership in Volt Ukraine and was succeeded by Anastasiia Vozovych and Erik Kooijmans as interim co-leaders.

== Organization ==
As of October 2024, Volt Ukraine is led by an interim team.

Name	Position
Ksenia Yarysh	Interim Co-Lead
Seraphim Kolodchuk	Interim Co-Lead
Artur Koldomasov	Senior Advisor
Karla Wagner	Senior Advisor
Olena Chuprynska	Policy Advisor
Henk van Donselaar	Community Advisor
Merel van der Knoop	Communications Advisor

== See also ==
- List of pro-European political parties
