= Sicilian Socialist Party =

Sicilian Socialist Party (in Italian) Partito Socialista Siciliano (Sicilian) Partitu Sucialista Sicilianu
- Leading figure: Antonio Matasso
- Founded: 21 May 2013
- Headquarters: Palermo
- Newspaper: Avanti! Sicilia
- Ideology: Democratic socialism Social democracy Sicilian autonomism Europeanism
- Political position: Centre-left
- National affiliation: Social Democracy

Website
- pssonline.it

The Sicilian Socialist Party (Italian: Partito Socialista Siciliano, Sicilian: Partitu Sucialista Sicilianu, PSS) is a democratic socialist and autonomist political party in Sicily. The party was founded on 21 May 2013 and considers itself to be the re-foundation of the 1893 Sicilian federation of the emerging Italian Socialist Party (PSI), often referred to as the Sicilian Socialist Party, which was founded by the leaders of Fasci Siciliani popular movement during a congress in Palermo on 21–22 May 1893. The PSS re-emerged exactly after 120 years from the first congress of the Fasci and in the same place of the 1893 assembly (the historical see of the Fascio of Palermo at 97, via Alloro).

The party adheres to the ideas of democratic socialism and of Sicilianism, without any isolationist view, but maintaining itself faithful to internationalism and europeanism. The party seeks the full application of Sicilian special statute and supports the unification of the Sicilian left-wing in a democratic socialist perspective. The members of the party come from the Sicilian sections of the Italian Socialist Party, the Italian Socialist Democratic Party and the Italian Socialist Party of Proletarian Unity.

In 2022, the Sicilian Socialist Party signed a federative pact with the Social Democracy, with the leader Antonio Matasso becoming regional secretary of the new national democratic socialist party.
