= Volt Albania =

Political party in Albania

Volt Albania Volt Shqipëri
- Abbreviation: Volt
- President: Marina Rrika, co-president
- Governing body: Edlira Meshau, Olaf Bello, board members
- Headquarters: Tirana
- Ideology: European federalism Social liberalism Progressivism; Pro-Europeanism; Pan-Europeanism
- Political position: Centre to Centre-left
- European political alliance: Volt Europa
- Colours: Purple

Website
- www.voltalbania.org

Volt Albania (Albanian: Volt Shqipëri) is a political party in Albania and the Albanian branch of Volt Europa, a progressive and federalist European political alliance.

== Founding and early development ==
Volt Albania was set up on 1 September 2020 by Albanians and international residents in Albania who wanted to promote a new approach to politics based on cooperation with Europe, democratic participation and policymaking which is based on evidence. The organisation was established as the Albanian branch of Volt Europa, a pan-European political movement that was founded in 2017. From the start, Volt Albania regarded Albania's integration into the European Union as one of its main political aims, stating that closer European integration should be linked to domestic political and institutional reforms.

When it was first being developed, Volt Albania aimed at setting up itself as a political movement that would be active both at the national level and as part of Volt's broader European network. Even though Albania is not a member of the EU, the organisation has maintained that European political cooperation should not be restricted to member states. Its activities have thus included domestic political involvement as well as taking part in Volt Europa's cross-border activities. Volt Albania has stated that Albania's integration into Europe is its top political priority and has supported bringing Albanian laws and institutions in line with European standards.

== Domestic political programme ==
The political programme of the organisation centres on various aspects of domestic reform. Volt Albania has stressed the need to combat corruption and to support Albania's justice institutions, such as the Special Structure against Corruption and Organised Crime (SPAK) and the Special Court against Corruption and Organised Crime (GJKKO). The party has also backed reforms aimed at strengthening democratic institutions, boosting citizen participation and improving the relationship between citizens and the state.

Environmental policy is also a major element of Volt Albania's programme. The organisation supports greater protection of Albania's natural environment, promotes investment in clean energy and recycling, advocates for better public transport and supports measures designed to reduce pollution. It has a goal of achieving climate neutrality by 2040, this being in line with Volt's general European climate policy but adjusted to take into account Albanian conditions.

== Organisational development ==
In 2024 Volt Albania achieved a significant point in its organisational development by organising its first General Assembly in November. Ardit Minarolli was chosen as co-president, Nathan Liefting as general secretary and Alban Shallas, Olaf Bello and Edlira Meshau were elected to the board. The assembly set up a more formal organisational structure and the organisation regarded this as an important move in its effort to turn Volt into a stronger political force in Albania.

== Gjadër immigration centre ==
On 21 November 2024, people representing Volt Albania, along with people from Volt Italy and Volt Europa, went to the immigration centres in Gjadër, in northern Albania. The trip occurred in the context of the agreement between the Italian and Albanian governments relating to the processing of migrants who are transferred from Italy to Albania. Volt expressed its criticism of the arrangement, on the grounds that the system caused concerns about European law and the protection of migrants' rights. The visit showed that Volt Albania is willing to take part in international and European policy matters as well as in domestic political issues in Albania.

== Volt Europa General Assembly in Tirana ==
The General Assembly of Volt Europa took place in Tirana from 23 to 24 November 2024, an event which was largely organised by Volt Albania. What made the assembly stand out was the fact that it was held outside the European Union, demonstrating Volt's aim of expanding its pan-European political movement beyond the present borders of the EU. Hundreds of Volt members from all over Europe attended the assembly to talk about European politics, democracy, equality, migration, the Western Balkans and the future of European integration. At the event, Volt Europa stressed that its political vision includes the EU candidate countries and that Albania and the wider Western Balkans should be taken into account when discussing the future political landscape of Europe.

== Political development after 2024 ==
After the 2024 General Assembly, Volt Albania still positioned itself as a pro-European political movement aiming to provide an alternative to Albania's existing political parties. The party's programme includes both domestic reforms and Volt's broader European agenda; together with EU accession, it supports a stronger and more integrated European Union, including a federal European Union, greater European democratic integration and the eventual creation of a European army.

The domestic programme of Volt Albania is based on its five main policy areas: a smart state, economic development, social equality, global balance and citizen empowerment, as well as a sixth area relating to the reform of the European Union. This structure is meant to offer a shared basis for all of Volt's national sections while at the same time enabling each section to adjust its policies in light of its own national conditions. In Albania, the framework has been linked to particular priorities involving corruption, justice reform, environmental protection, digitalisation, democratic participation and EU accession.

== Membership and political outreach ==
The organisation has also wanted to extend its support to groups other than young and politically active people in cities. Volt Albania positions itself as a movement that is open to citizens from all different professional and social backgrounds, such as students, entrepreneurs, farmers and civil-society activists. Its declared objective is to create a political alternative grounded in transparency, solidarity, economic opportunity and European integration.
