= Volt Sweden =

Swedish political party

Volt Sweden Volt Sverige
- Abbreviation: Volt
- Chairpersons: Aaron Benzinger; Laura Wiegand
- Founded: 2 July 2018; 8 years ago
- Headquarters: Stockholm
- Ideology: Social liberalism Pro-Europeanism; European federalism
- Political position: Centre to centre-left
- European political alliance: Volt Europa
- Colors: Purple
- Riksdag: 0 / 349
- European Parliament: 0 / 21

Website
- https://www.voltsverige.org/

Volt Sweden (Swedish: Volt Sverige, Volt) is a political party in Sweden and part of Volt Europa, a progressive and federalist European political alliance.

== History ==
Volt Sverige was founded on 2 July 2018 and participated in the 2019 European Parliament election in Sweden.

National sections of Volt Europa. The borders of the European Union are shown in red.

In early November 2021, the Ljusnarsberg branch of Liberalerna announced its intention to become an independent association and run under Volt in the local elections. The branch cited disagreements with the national party's willingness to cooperate with the Sweden Democrats as the main reason for leaving. The branch's locally elected representative, Hendrik Bijloo, subsequently joined Volt, becoming the first Volt representative in Sweden.

== Elections ==
=== 2019 ===
In the 2019 European Parliament election in Sweden, Volt Sverige contested the election without printed ballot papers. Instead, the party relied on voters writing the party's name on blank ballot papers, as permitted under Swedish electoral rules. The party's leading candidates were Michael Holz and Namie Folkesson.

In the final results, Volt Sverige received 146 votes nationwide and did not win any seats in the European Parliament.

=== 2022 ===
In the 2022 Swedish parliamentary election, Volt Sverige participated at the national level and received 89 votes nationwide.

In the same election cycle, the party also contested regional elections in Stockholm and Skåne, as well as local elections in Stockholm, Vaxholm, Malmö, Lund, Gothenburg, Linköping and Ljusnarsberg.

In Ljusnarsberg, Volt received 1.2% of the vote, losing the seat held by Hendrik Bijloo and failing to secure reelection on the council.

=== 2024 ===
On 29 October 2023, the party announced its list for the 2024 European Parliament election in Sweden. The candidates were Michael Holz, Carri Ginter Wikström, Alexander Löf and Ted Lindström.

In the election, held on 9 June 2024, Volt Sverige received 388 votes nationwide, an increase from 146 votes in the 2019 election, but did not win any seats in the European Parliament.

=== 2026 ===
Ahead of the 2026 Swedish general election, Volt Sverige announced that Niclas Hansemark and Nurten Özkoray were selected as top candidates on its parliamentary list.

In the end the party received 228 votes nationwide.

The party also announced that it was running candidates in seven regional councils: Stockholm, Västra Götaland, Skåne, Uppsala, Östergötland, Norrbotten, and Västerbotten, as well as 16 municipal councils: Stockholm, Gothenburg, Lund, Uppsala, Linköping, Söderköping, Skövde, Ekerö, Lidingö, Borås, Hässleholm, Kristianstad, Umeå, Skellefteå, Pajala, and Kävlinge.
