= EUROMAT =

Federation of European trade associations

EUROMAT The European Gaming and Amusement Federation
- Formation: 1979
- Type: Advocacy Group
- Headquarters: 22-24, Rue du Luxembourg, 1000 Brussels, Belgium
- Location: European Union
- Members: 14 national member associations from 11 European countries
- President: Jason Frost
- Website: www.euromat.org

The European Gaming and Amusement Federation (EUROMAT) is a Brussels-based federation of European trade associations representing the gaming and amusement industry at European Union level.

== Organisation ==
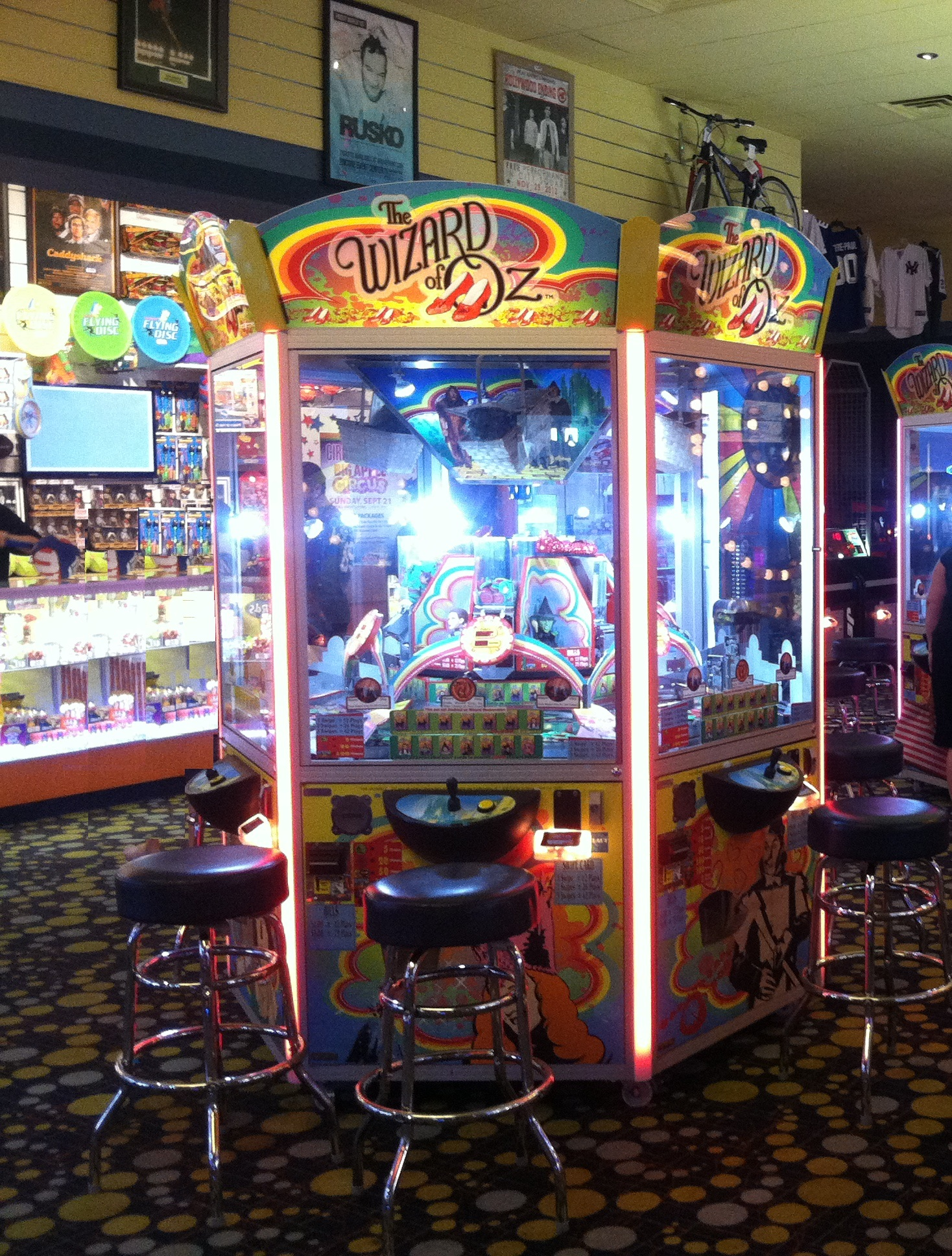
An example of a game in an amusement arcade: a Wizard of Oz pushing game that can be found at many arcades today.

=== History ===
The European Gaming and Amusement Federation (EUROMAT) was established in 1979. Its secretariat is located in Brussels, the capital city of Belgium and the de facto capital of the European Union (EU). Although EUROMAT mainly follows European political developments, it also endeavours to monitor international developments as they happen.

=== Structure ===
As of 2025, the federation represents 14 national member associations from 11 European countries . EUROMAT is supported by a secretariat based in Brussels, as well as an Executive Committee.

In May 2025, Jason Frost, of the British Amusement Catering Trade Association (BACTA), was reelected president of EUROMAT.

=== Mission ===
The overall mission of the Federation is to contribute to the creation of a healthy business and legal environment for the gaming industry in the EU.

EUROMAT instigates dialogue with the European Union and other pan-European bodies, with whom it hopes to use its position and membership to stimulate debate and awareness. The federation also monitors and attempts to influence the European regulations on legal, commercial and technical aspects of the business to guarantee the best possible future for the gaming sector, by giving one voice to its members on all matters affecting the industry.

As well as defending the interests of the gaming industry by providing continued and accurate information on the gaming sector to citizens, European media and national administrations, EUROMAT supports all its member associations in their efforts to adopt, promote and enforce the appropriate code of conduct for themselves and their associates.

=== Activities ===
Much of the Federation's work consists of monitoring developments within the European Union, and keeping member associations informed of upcoming legislation that may potentially affect them. Additionally, the organization collects and distributes information on the amusement industry on a regular basis.

== Membership ==
EUROMAT's members range from operators, manufacturers, distributors and owners of amusement equipment.

=== Members ===
Country	Association
Croatia	Croatian Gaming Association
Germany	Bundesverband Automatenunternehmer e.V. (BA)
Germany	Verband der Deutschen Automatenindustrie e.V. (VDAI)
Italy	Sezioni Apparecchi per Pubbliche Attrazioni Ricreative (SAPAR)
Ireland	The Irish Amusement Trades Association (IATA)
Montenegro	Montenegro Bet
Netherlands	VAN Kansspelen Branche-organisatie (VAN)
Romania	Asociația Organizatorilor și Producătorilor de Jocuri de Noroc din România (AOPJNR)
Romania	Asociatia Organizatorilor de Sloturi (ROSMLOT)
Serbia	Asocijacija Gaming Operatera Sribije (AGOS)
Spain	Club de Convergentes
United Kingdom	British Amusement Catering Trades Association (BACTA)
Bulgaria	Association of Organizers of Gambling Games in Bulgaria (AOGGAB)
Bulgaria	Bulgarian Association for Responsible Gambling (SBAOH)

Country	Association (Former Member)
Belgium	Belgian Gaming Association (BGA)
Czech Republic	SPELOS
Denmark	Dansk Automat Brancheforening (DAB)
France	ASL Interactifs
Germany	Deutscher Automaten-Großhandels-Verband e.V. (DAGV)
Hungary	Magyar Szerencsejáték Szövetség (MSZSZ)
Lithuania	Nacionalinė lošimų ir žaidimų verslo asociacija (NLŽVA)
Serbia	Udruženje Priređivača Igara na Sreću (JAKTA)
Spain	Asociación Española de Empresarios de Máquinas Recreativas (FACOMARE)
Spain	Confederación Española de Empresarios del Juego (COFAR)

== Publications ==
Since its foundation in 1979, EUROMAT has published books and brochures discussing the status of gambling issues at the EU-level, such as:

- Responsible Gaming|Responsible Gambling: A statement of principles and a showcase of best practice from the European gaming and amusement industry (2009)
- The Future of Gaming and Amusement in Europe: A collection of essays (2006)
- Playing Fair: Social Responsibility in Gaming (2015)
