= Volt Czechia =

Volt Czechia Volt Česko
- Abbreviation: Volt
- Leader: Adam Hanka and Kateřina Šrámková
- Deputy Leaders: Kamila Kurníková
- Founder: Adam Hanka and Adam Felix
- Registered: 29 June 2022; 4 years ago
- Headquarters: Prague, Czech Republic
- Ideology: Social liberalism Progressivism; European federalism
- Political position: Centre to centre-left
- European political alliance: Volt Europa
- Colours
- Chamber of Deputies: 0 / 200
- Senate: 0 / 81
- European Parliament: 0 / 21

Website
- voltcesko.org

Volt Czechia (Czech: Volt Česko, Volt) is a political party in the Czech Republic and the Czech branch of Volt Europa.

== History ==
National sections of Volt Europa. The borders of the European Union are shown in red.

Volt Czechia was founded in 2019. It operated from 11 April 2021 to 28 June 2022 as a registered association, Volt Česká Republika, chaired by Karolina Machová and Adam Hanka, with Jan Klátil as treasurer. On 29 June 2022 Volt Česko was registered as a political party in the Czech Republic. Hanka was elected chair of the new party.

The party contested an election for the first time in the 2022 Prague municipal election, receiving 4,816 votes (0.14%).

In October 2022, Volt Czech Republic hosted the General Assembly of Volt Europa. In October 2023, Volt and Senator 21 announced that they would be running a joint list of candidates in the 2024 European elections. In November, the party elected Adam Hanka and Barbora Hrubá as the party's lead candidates for the European elections. The SEN 21 and Volt joint list received 0.34%.

Volt Czechia will participate in the 2025 Czech parliamentary election. The party filed lawsuits against the so-called "non-coalitions" of Freedom and Direct Democracy (SPD) and Stačilo!, arguing that they were circumventing the higher threshold in place for coalitions, but all cases were rejected at the regional courts. Volt said they would appeal the case to the Constitutional Court, which will rule on the case after the election, during the result certification process.

== Policies ==
=== European integration ===
Volt Czechia advocates deeper European integration and supports the long-term development of a federal European Union. The party supports strengthening the powers of the European Parliament, replacing unanimity voting in the Council of the European Union with qualified majority voting in more policy areas, and increasing democratic accountability at the European level.

The party also supports the creation of common European defence capabilities, stronger coordination of foreign policy and intelligence services, and deeper cooperation among EU member states in security matters.

=== Security and defence ===
Volt supports strengthening Czech and European security through greater European cooperation. The party advocates shared intelligence capacities, joint procurement of military equipment and the gradual development of a European army operating alongside NATO.

=== Economy ===
Volt supports adoption of the euro by the Czech Republic and advocates policies aimed at strengthening innovation, entrepreneurship and technological development. The party supports reducing administrative burdens, investing in research and development, and creating favourable conditions for start-ups and small businesses.

=== Climate and energy ===
Volt considers climate change one of the key challenges facing Europe. The party supports achieving climate neutrality through investment in renewable energy, energy efficiency and modern infrastructure. It advocates ending coal-fired electricity generation by 2033, expanding solar power and wind power, promoting community energy projects and modernising electricity networks.

=== Education ===
Volt advocates modernising the Czech education system with a stronger focus on digital literacy, critical thinking, foreign language skills and lifelong learning. The party supports closer cooperation between educational institutions and employers, as well as greater support for teachers.

=== Social policy ===
The party supports equal rights, social inclusion and accessible public services. It advocates affordable housing, improved mental health services, support for older people and measures aimed at reducing social exclusion. It also supports gender equality and equal treatment regardless of sexual orientation or gender identity.

=== Digitalisation ===
Digital transformation of the state is one of Volt's core policy priorities. The party supports expanding e-government services, reducing bureaucracy through technology, increasing government transparency through open data and promoting the responsible use of artificial intelligence in public administration.

== Finances ==
The party is financed by donations from private individuals; donations from companies and legal entities are prohibited. All donations are published in a transparent account and non-financial donations are published on the party's website.

== Election results ==
=== Chamber of Deputies ===
Election	List leader	Votes	%	Seats	+/−
2025	Mikuláš Peksa	3,639	0.06	0 / 200	New

=== European Parliament ===
Election	List leader	Votes	%	Seats	+/−	EP Group
2024 (Note: as part of the SEN 21 and Volt coalition.)	Lenka Helena Koenigsmark	9,955	0.34 (#15)	0 / 21	New	−

=== Senate ===
Election	First round			Second round			Seats	Total seats	+/–
Election	Votes	%	Place	Votes	%	Place	Seats	Total seats	+/–
2026	12,254	1.06	15th	9,858	2.08	11th	0 / 27	0 / 81	New

=== Prague City Assembly ===
Election	Leader	Votes	%	Seats
2022	Adam Hanka	4,816	0.02	0 / 65
