= Volt Austria =

Volt Austria Volt Österreich
- President: Karoline Adam, co-president Ricardo Winter, co-president
- Founded: 12 October 2018; 7 years ago
- Headquarters: Vienna, Austria
- Membership (January 2026): 147
- Ideology: European federalism; Pan-Europeanism; Progressivism; Social liberalism
- European political alliance: Volt Europa
- Colors: Purple

Website
- https://www.voltoesterreich.org

National sections of Volt Europa. The borders of the European Union are shown in red.

Volt Austria (short name: Volt; German: Volt Österreich) is a social liberal political party in Austria and the Austrian chapter of Volt Europa, a progressive and federalist European political alliance.

== Policies ==
Volt advocates a common European approach to challenges such as the climate crisis, migration, digitalisation and security. In its programme, the party advocates strengthening the EU and the European Parliament, achieving climate neutrality, a Europe-wide minimum wage and an EU army. The party also wants to promote citizen participation.

=== European policy ===
Volt is in favour of introducing additional EU-wide transnational lists for elections to the European Parliament, strengthening the European Parliament and replacing the unanimity principle in the European Council with a majority vote to prevent blockades.

=== Transport policy ===
The party wants to promote and expand public transport for commuters and invest more in electromobility.

=== Foreign and security policy ===
To strengthen security, Volt wants to establish an EU army and is striving for a common European foreign policy.

== History ==
Volt Austria has been registered as a party since October 12, 2018 with the aim of contesting the European elections 2019, but did not manage to collect the necessary 2600 declarations of support for a candidacy. According to the lead candidate Benjamin Wolf, the members then supported the election campaigns of the other Volt parties. Since then, the party has contested regional and local elections in Austria. In the 2024 European elections, the party is running with author and European activist Nini Tsiklauri and lawyer Alexander Harrer as its top duo. The required number of supporter signatures was clearly not reached. By linking a prize draw for Taylor Swift concert tickets with the submission of supporter signatures, criminal proceedings are possible.

== Elections ==
=== European elections 2024 ===
In October 2023, Volt announced its lead candidate, the author and European activist Nini Tsiklauri. Together with the lawyer Alexander Harrer, she forms the leadcandidate duo for the 2024 European elections. The joint election programme of the Volt parties was adopted at the Volt Europa General Assembly in Paris in November 2023.

In the run-up to the election, the party criticised the fact that the federal government did not provide EU citizens with sufficient information about the European elections and that they had to register to vote, meaning that over 500,000 EU citizens in Austria were unable to vote in 2019. To change this, the party launched the voteurope.eu website, which provides information on registration in various languages.

== Structure ==
Volt's unique characteristic is its transnational approach of actively campaigning for the same goals as a single party throughout Europe. As European law does not permit this in this form, the party has to take a diversion by founding national parties in each EU member state.

The party is organized in local and regional teams and active in Upper Austria, Salzburg, Styria, Tyrol, Vorarlberg and Vienna.

Most members of the party were never active in a party before joining Volt.
