= Volt Denmark =

Volt Denmark Volt Danmark
- Abbreviation: Volt
- Founded: 21 July 2018; 8 years ago
- Headquarters: Copenhagen
- Ideology: Social liberalism Pan-Europeanism
- European political alliance: Volt Europa

Website
- www.voltdanmark.org

Volt Denmark — Denmark's European Party (Danish: Volt Danmark — Danmarks Europaparti), known simply as Volt Denmark, is a social liberal political party in Denmark, and the Danish chapter of the pan-European political movement Volt Europa.

== Policies ==
=== Security policy ===
In order to combat cross-border crime, Volt supports a closer integration of Denmark into the Europol structures and criticises in an open letter the previous Danish policy, which instead relied on bilateral agreements with neighbouring states. By abolishing border controls and closer European cooperation of police authorities, freed resources should be used to better fight terrorism, illegal migration and international crime.

The party supported the lifting of the defence opt-out in June 2022, cautioning against relying solely on the US for security, with reference to Donald Trump, and campaigned for more European cooperation and the development of a Danish vision for the European Union.

=== Climate protection and energy policy ===
Volt calls for the expansion of the European electricity grid to strengthen the exchange of renewable wind and solar energy. The party supported the inclusion of nuclear power in the EU's green taxonomy, but criticised the fact that fossil natural gas was also classified as sustainable and that European energy policy is oriented towards national interests. The party, on the other hand, sees the need for a common European strategy in moving away from fossil fuels. Denmark should lift the ban on building nuclear power plants on Danish soil and participate in research on modern nuclear technology.

Danish shipping is to become climate neutral by 2030 and global influence in the shipping industry is to be used to advance the goals agreed at the UN Climate Change Conference in Glasgow. To this end, public-private partnerships are to be formed to also reduce emissions in supply chains.

=== Rule of law ===
To protect the rule of law, ensure that the government acts lawfully and that new laws do not violate the constitution, Volt calls for the establishment of a permanent, impartial judicial body modelled on Germany's Constitutional Court.

=== Human rights ===
The party supports the protests of women in Iran against the Iranian regime and for freedom and democracy.

=== Economic policy ===
The party is committed to targeting foreign workers to meet labour needs and drive the green transformation of the economy. To this end, cities should not only be made attractive places to live and work for international workers, but jobs should also be advertised on the pan-European job portal EURES.

== History ==
The party was formed in May 2018 and incorporated on 21 July 2018. Ina Hoogeland and Frederik Larsen were party leaders and Mathieu Pouletty was the treasurer. In the run-up to the 2019 European elections, Volt failed to meet the signature hurdle and did not collect enough supporting signatures to be eligible for the election.

In November 2021, the party contested an election for the first time in the municipal elections in Frederiksberg. It did not achieve a mandate.

=== Local elections 2021 ===
National sections of Volt Europa. The borders of the European Union are shown in red.

In the course of the municipal elections, the party advocated a House of Democracy and citizens' dialogues and assemblies along the lines of deliberative democracy as described by the OECD, in order to address current challenges such as a mobility transition and the design of a new city district. The candidates deliberately talk a lot about visions and ideas for the EU, as much of the work of municipalities is determined by EU legislation and municipalities also increasingly work on an international level. Volt therefore wants to strengthen the European dimension and the international network in Frederiksberg. The party's goal is a green, socially responsible and future-oriented municipality. Volt's candidate Mathieu Pouletty was the first time a Frenchman stood in the Danish municipal elections. Volt received 0.2% of the vote.
