= Damian Boeselager =

German business consultant, journalist and politician

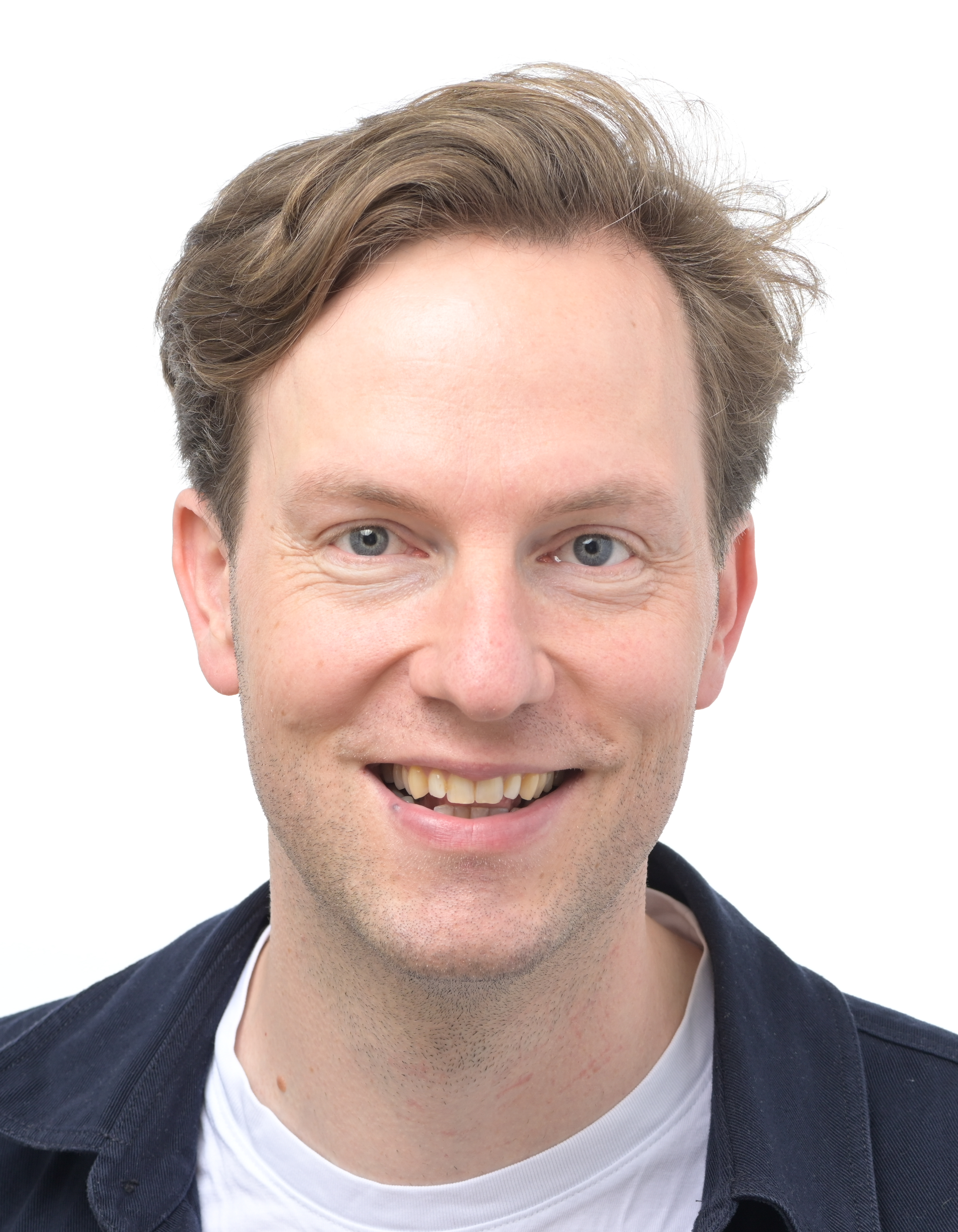
- Boeselager in 2024

Member of the European Parliament for Germany
- Incumbent
- Assumed office 2 July 2019

Personal details
- Born: 8 March 1988 (age 38) Frankfurt, West Germany (now Germany)
- Party: Volt Germany
- Other political affiliations: Greens-European Free Alliance
- Education: University of Bayreuth; Hertie School
- Website: https://damianboeselager.org/

Damian Hieronymus Johannes Freiherr von Boeselager (German pronunciation: [ˈbøːzəˌlaːɡɐ]; born 8 March 1988) is a German business consultant, journalist and politician of Volt Europa. He is member of European Parliament in The Greens/EFA Group since his election in 2019.

== Career ==
Boeselager is descended from the aristocratic Boeselager family. His grandfather Philipp von Boeselager was a Wehrmacht field officer in Nazi Germany and a member of the 20 July Plot (attempt to assassinate Hitler). His father is the banker Georg von Boeselager and his mother Huberta, née Thiel. Damian Freiherr von Boeselager is Catholic and the youngest of four children, born in Frankfurt am Main.

Boeselager graduated from high school at the Catholic private school Aloisiuskolleg in Bad Godesberg. From 2008 to 2011, he studied Philosophy and Economics at the University of Bayreuth and Public Administration at the Hertie School of Governance in Berlin from 2016 to 2017. Boeselager completed a semester abroad at Columbia University in New York City. In 2018, he graduated with a master's degree.

In 2012, Boeselager initiated a journalistic travel project, Euroskop, with Bernhard Clemm and Jan Stöckmann, which took him to 20 European capitals. The aim of the project was to discuss the future of the continent with young people in Europe and, alongside this, to interview journalists, academics, politicians and activists. The three published their travel reports on euroskop.org. Print articles appeared in The European and Die Zeit.

From 2013 to 2016, Boeselager worked for McKinsey & Company as a management consultant. During his time at the consulting firm, he says he advised government agencies and an organisation for orphans.

== Political career ==
In 2017, Boeselager together with Andrea Venzon from Italy and Colombe Cahen-Salvador from France founded the political party Volt Europa. They described their party-project as "pan-European", "pragmatic", and "progressive". Boeselager got elected to the Vice President of Volt and was together with Marie-Isabelle Heiss the German top candidate for Volt in the 2019 European elections. During the European election campaign Boeselager did not pursue any income activity and was financially supported by his family.

Boeselager is the main "face" of the party Volt and main interview partner in media outlets due to his party activities. Ranking first in the German list of Volt Europa, which reached 0.7%, he was elected to the European Parliament in 2019.

=== Member of the European Parliament, 2019–present ===
In parliament, Boeselager has been serving as member of the Committee on Constitutional Affairs and as substitute of the Committee on Budgets. He has been the parliament's rapporteur on the budget of the European Union for 2022.

=== 2024 European Parliament election ===
On 16 September 2023, Boeselager was re-elected as the top candidate for the 2024 European Parliament election at the party's convention in Erfurt. The top quartet for the European election also includes Nela Riehl, Kai Tegethoff and business consultant colleague Rebekka Müller. In Brussels on 7 April 2024, Boeselager was elected as Volt's European lead candidate for the 2024 European elections together with Sophie in 't Veld (formerly D66).

== Political positions ==
=== Electoral reform ===
Boeselager advocates the introduction of transnational lists for the election of the European Parliament, so that European parties with a common programme can be elected with a second vote, thus Europeanising the elections. In addition, the right to vote from the age of 16 should be introduced for European elections. He also called for making it easier for EU citizens outside their home country to vote in local and European elections, abolishing an exemption that allows EU states to restrict the right to vote of EU citizens of other states if they make up more than 20% of all EU citizens residing in the national territory, and the possibility of reserving top positions in local governments for their own nationals.

As representative of the Green Group, Boeselager took part in the negotiations on the EU electoral law reform and in bringing the legislation through the Parliament. In doing so, he welcomed the introduction of transnational lists, but criticised the introduction of a 3.5% blocking clause in European elections as anti-democratic. Currently, the legislative proposal is with the Council of the European Union.

=== Digital currency ===
Boeselager is an advocate of digital payment methods. In his opinion, the European Central Bank could have a special function here, in that every citizen would have a "digital euro note that could be transferred". In fact, this could eliminate many transaction costs. However, this could damage the current national banking system.

=== Health policy ===
During the COVID-19 pandemic, Boeselager often criticised the national approach as well as the sometimes different ways of the member states. In his opinion, a European exchange of information could have led to a much better response and saved lives. He also notes that the pandemic was first and foremost a health crisis. In future, there should be better supranational cooperation in health crises.

For future pandemics, training and recruiting good medical professionals could also be helpful. In general, Boeselager believes that working conditions in the medical sector should also be improved.

=== Migration and skilled workers shortage ===
Boeselager advocated for better distribution or targeted recruitment of migrants according to their professional skills. In this way, the Europe-wide shortage of skilled workers in many technical and medical professions could be combated. If the citizens did not act promptly, there could be financial losses and disadvantages in terms of technological progress because up to 50 million skilled workers would be lost over the next 30 years. He also wants to push for people to have the right to move freely within the EU once they have lived there for at least three years. Boeselager sees advantages for internal migration in Europe in Europe-wide regulations for migrants, as this could create a Europe-wide labour market. "For migrants, European freedom of movement is [still] an illusion", says Boeselager.

=== Asylum ===
Boeselager condemns the deaths at Europe's external borders. He advocates a common European asylum system.

=== Economy and energy transition ===
Boeselager is his group's spokesperson for the European Corona Recovery Plan. He was a negotiator of the Reconstruction and Resilience Facility in 2020 (EUR 672.5 billion) and the RePowerEU support programme. Boeselagers opposed greenwashing in these programmes. He supports the European Green Deal.

=== Ukraine ===
Boeselager supports Ukraine and negotiates EU funding for Ukrainian reconstruction.

=== Handling data and data protection ===
Boeselager wants to advocate that data collected through digital devices should not only be available to the manufacturing companies, but also to the end users. He also advocates using non-personal data as information to improve products and making it available on data marketplaces. This could be particularly useful with regard to improving wind turbines, for example. Based on this, the EU's Data Act was drafted.

=== Transparency ===
Boeselager calls for more transparency in politics. It should be clearly visible whether and how much additional money MPs receive and what they spend public money on. He therefore also calls for EU-wide transparency of lobbying activities.

=== European federalism ===
Boeselager calls for European federalism. It should be clearly regulated which measures and laws are regulated at which level. He also criticises the lack of an institution at the European level comparable to the Bundesrat and the lack of the European Parliament's right of initiative. Furthermore, there should be a government that can be elected by the people.

== Awards ==
- 2020: Hertie School's Alumni Achievement Award
