= Volt Romania =

Romanian political party

Volt Romania Volt România
- Abbreviation: Volt
- Leader: Mihaela Sirițanu, Ștefan Florea
- Chairperson: Diana Oltean, Claudia Ciuraru-Cucu, Cristina Ciobotariu, Matei Macri, Christian Macedonschi
- General Secretary: Valentin Sava
- Founder: Ștefan Florea, Ionuț Lăcustă
- Founded: 19 February 2021
- Headquarters: Bucharest
- Ideology: Social liberalism; European federalism
- National affiliation: Platform for Democracy, Prosperity, and Progress
- European political alliance: Volt Europa
- Colors: Purple

Website
- Official website

Volt Romania (Romanian: Volt România) is a European federalist party in Romania. It has been active as an affiliate of Volt Europa since 2017 and was officially registered as a party in February 2021.

== Policies ==
The party is committed to digitalisation, investment in sustainable economy, feminism, LGBTIQ+, multiculturalism, poverty reduction and social justice.

The party structures its programme in 6 pillars:

- Active citizenship/civic development: Promote strong, participatory and deliberative democracy, transparency in governance, removal of bureaucratic obstacles and creation of participatory mechanisms such as citizens' assemblies.
- Economic renewal: The economy and innovation are to be promoted through research and debureaucratisation. This should promote social prosperity, adaptation to the European single market and sustainability.
- Global balance: Global challenges are to be addressed through policies that go hand in hand with the values of an open society, security, economic development and cooperation.
- Reform of the European Union: An even more democratic, united and strong European Union, a federalised EU with a directly elected leadership, with institutions empowered to harmonise and integrate national laws and realise European common aspirations.
- "Smart state": This pillar aims to improve state institutions. For example, state transparency is to be promoted, corruption is to be fought, state institutions are to be digitalised and the public administration is to be developed into a service provider for citizens.
- Social equality: Everyone should have access to the same rights and opportunities as other citizens and be treated with the same dignity, irrespective of economic, social, economic, employment, etc. status, or ethnic, sexual, gender religion, or other identity. To this end, the party aims to promote proactive, inclusive and anti-discriminatory measures to realise human rights.

== History ==
Member associations of Volt Europa

The party emerged in 2017 as part of the pro-European movement Volt Europa against anti-democratic, illiberal and populist tendencies. It initially focused on supporting citizens' initiatives, launched to motivate the diaspora to participate in the 2019 European elections and took part in the years of protests for more rule of law. In doing so, it initiated the #12days (#12zile) campaign and organised protests for the rule of law and against the government.

In January 2020, the group applied to be registered as a political party, but the competent court rejected the application, citing the movement's transnational and progressive character and lack of national identity. 12 months later, on 19 February 2021, the Bucharest Court of Appeal ruled in favour of the party, which was thus officially admitted. Its founders are Ștefan Florea, Ionuț Lăcustă, Cristina Săracu, Remus Grecu and Edinger Otmar. This makes it the 15th nationally registered party of Volt Europa.

At its first national general assembly in June 2021, the party elected Ștefan Florea and Cristina Săracu as new chairpersons with a term limited to 6 months. At the fourth party congress, Mihaela Sirițanu and Ciprian Sandu were elected as new chairpersons.

In June 2023, the party hosted the General Assembly of Volt Europa and organised a big rally for the inclusion of Romania in the Schengen area.

Since its foundation, the party has been working to build structures for the 2024 European and parliamentary elections.

== Competition ==
It is considered a possible competitor for the party Save Romania Union, which is represented in parliament, and is repeatedly compared with it.

== See also ==
- Volt Europa
- European federalization
