= Volt Germany =

German political party

Volt Germany Volt Deutschland
- Abbreviation: Volt
- Leaders: Alexandra Barsuhn; Tim Marton
- Chairpersons: Katharina Brinck; Thi Thuc Tran; Maximilian Hohenstatt; Christoph Thurner
- Founded: 3 March 2018; 8 years ago
- Headquarters: Berlin
- Membership (September 2026): 10,419
- Ideology: European federalism; Social liberalism; Progressivism; Pro-Europeanism
- Political position: Centre-left
- European Parliament group: Greens/EFA (since 2019)
- European political alliance: Volt Europa
- Colours: Purple
- Bundestag: 0 / 630
- European Parliament: 3 / 96

Website
- voltdeutschland.org

National sections of Volt Europa. The borders of the European Union are shown in red.

Volt Germany (German: Volt Deutschland), mostly known by the abbreviated name Volt, is a social-liberal pro-European, eurofederalist political party in Germany. It is the German branch of Volt Europa, a progressive European political movement.

Italian Andrea Venzon, French Colombe Cahen-Salvador and German Damian Boeselager founded Volt Europa in 2017 as a counterpart to the rising nationalism and right-wing populism in Europe.

The party has been classified as socially liberal and pro-European. The key topics are: reform of the European Union, tackling the climate crisis, a fair and sustainable economy, and digitalization. Volt claims to have an evidence-based, scientific approach and is highly interested in introducing best practices.

As registration as a European political party requires representation in at least seven EU member states, following the creation of its parent organisation Volt Europa A.I.S.B.L., the Volt movement started founding national parties to participate in elections. On 3 March 2018, Volt Germany was founded as a party in Hamburg. Volt Germany's first elections were the 2019 European elections and they were able to win one mandate, which Damian Boeselager holds in the European Parliament. At the municipal level, Volt Germany is part of the city governments of Munich, Cologne, Frankfurt am Main, Münster and Wiesbaden among others.

The party's name is derived from the international electrical unit Volt in order to have a uniform name that is understandable throughout Europe, symbolizing "new energy" for Europe.

== History ==
In 2016, Andrea Venzon from Italy, Colombe Cahen-Salvador from France and Damian Boeselager from Germany were living and studying in the United States. Dismayed by the shift to the right and rising nationalism in Europe and the US, culminating in the Brexit referendum and Trump's election, among other things, they decided to found a European citizens' movement. On 29 March 2017, the day the UK declared Brexit Article 50, the non-profit association Vox Europa A.I.S.B.L. was founded in Luxembourg.

Due to several reasons, Vox Europa was already renamed Volt Europa on 19 June 2018. The new name, derived from the international unit for the measurement of electrical potential, is intended to describe the energy that Volt brings to the political landscape, on the one hand, and on the other hand, the word "Volt" is inclusive, as it is understood in all European languages.

Due to legal regulations, it was and is not possible to found a European party. In order to be able to participate in elections, Volt had to found national parties. In March 2018, the party Volt Germany was founded as the first national offshoot of Volt Europa. As of 27 September 2021, Volt Europa is active in 29 countries, and officially registered as parties in 16 of them.

Volt Hamburg was the first national association of Volt Germany to be founded in late 2019. By April 2021, the founding of the other 15 state associations followed, so that Volt Germany is now organized nationwide in state associations.

Volt's first elections were the 2019 European elections. Due to different national registration requirements, Volt was able to participate in the elections in only eight member states. Volt contested with the same election programme, the Amsterdam Declaration, in all eight countries. In addition to noticeable successes, for example in the Netherlands (1,9%), and Luxembourg (2%) the party was able to gain 0.7% of the votes in Germany. As a result, the leading candidate Damian Boeselager entered the EU Parliament.

Volt views itself not only as a party, but also as a citizens' movement. Several initiatives, NGOs, etc. were founded, initiated or supported by Volt Europa and Volt Germany. These include the now independent aid organisation #EuropeCares, the initiative and petition #StopHomelessness, the initiative #ValuesOverPower, which campaigns against corruption and for the rule of law, as well as the European citizens' initiative EUrotrain.

In the 2021 federal election, Volt received 0.4% of the national vote (164,272 votes) and failed to win any seats.

In the 2024 European parliament elections, Volt received 2.6% of the vote (1,023,161 votes), breaking 1,000,000 votes for the first time and winning 3 seats. Boeselager was re-elected, along with co-leading candidate Nela Riehl and Kai Tegethoff.

In the 2025 federal election, Volt doubled the number of votes they received compared with the 2021 federal election, but failed to win any seats.

== Policies ==
=== Programmatic development ===
After its foundation, the "5+1 Challenges" were adopted for the parent organization Volt Europa. Soon afterwards, the European basic programme Mapping of Policies was adopted, which serves as the basis for the creation of all Volt programmes. Volt Europa finally stood for the European elections in 2019 with the election programme derived from the European policy programme, the Amsterdam Declaration. Since then, the Mapping of Policies has been accompanied by several thematic documents. Together with the Mapping of Policies, these documents form the so-called Policy Portfolio, from which all national, regional and local programmes are derived.

On 22 December 2020, Volt Germany presented the basic policy programme adapted to Germany on the basis of the Mapping of Policies and later developed the election programme for the 2021 Bundestag elections from it.

=== Programme ===
==== European policy ====
Volt sees the European Union (EU) as the most successful intergovernmental project since the Second World War, enabling Europe's citizens to live in peace, freedom and prosperity. At the same time, Volt believes that the often outdated, entrenched political structures of the EU are increasingly reaching their limits when facing current and future challenges. Volt is convinced that these challenges cannot be met effectively by addressing them alone and at a national level, but only with stronger integration and more European democracy.

In Volt's view, the reform of the European Union must begin with the reform of its bodies and institutions. Volt calls for an EU of and by its citizens with reformed electoral law and more participation, in which the directly elected parliament and not individual heads of state and government decide the common future. Volt's goal is a European federal republic that should be able to meet current challenges – from climate change to mobility transformation and digitalisation, to social inequality. This also includes a common European army, instead of many national ones.

==== Climate policy ====
Volt aims to make Germany CO_{2}-neutral by 2035 and climate-neutral by 2040. The party's strategy consists of an holistic approach, described as a social-liberal transformation. For Volt, climate policy is a cross-cutting issue. It is important to the party that climate policy is designed in a socially compatible way and that the economy is set up in an economically as well as ecologically sustainable way. In order to achieve the goal of comprehensive decarbonisation, the party calls for an increase in the CO_{2} price. At the end of the holistic transformation there should be a circular economy. The party emphasises the importance of social cohesion in the course of the transformation to climate neutrality.

==== Social policy ====
Volt strives for a community of solidarity in which social mobility and participation in prosperity of all citizens is improved. To this end, destigmatized and appropriate social security systems that enable people to participate in society and plan their individual lives are to be created. The core issue in this context is the common good-oriented economy in order to counteract the social divide. According to Volt, the labour market is too bureaucratic, contains unclear legal regulations, sets the wrong incentives and lacks protection. The party, therefore, wants to create a new framework and improve employment relationships. Volt wants to reform the education system to a large extent and plans the "school of the future".

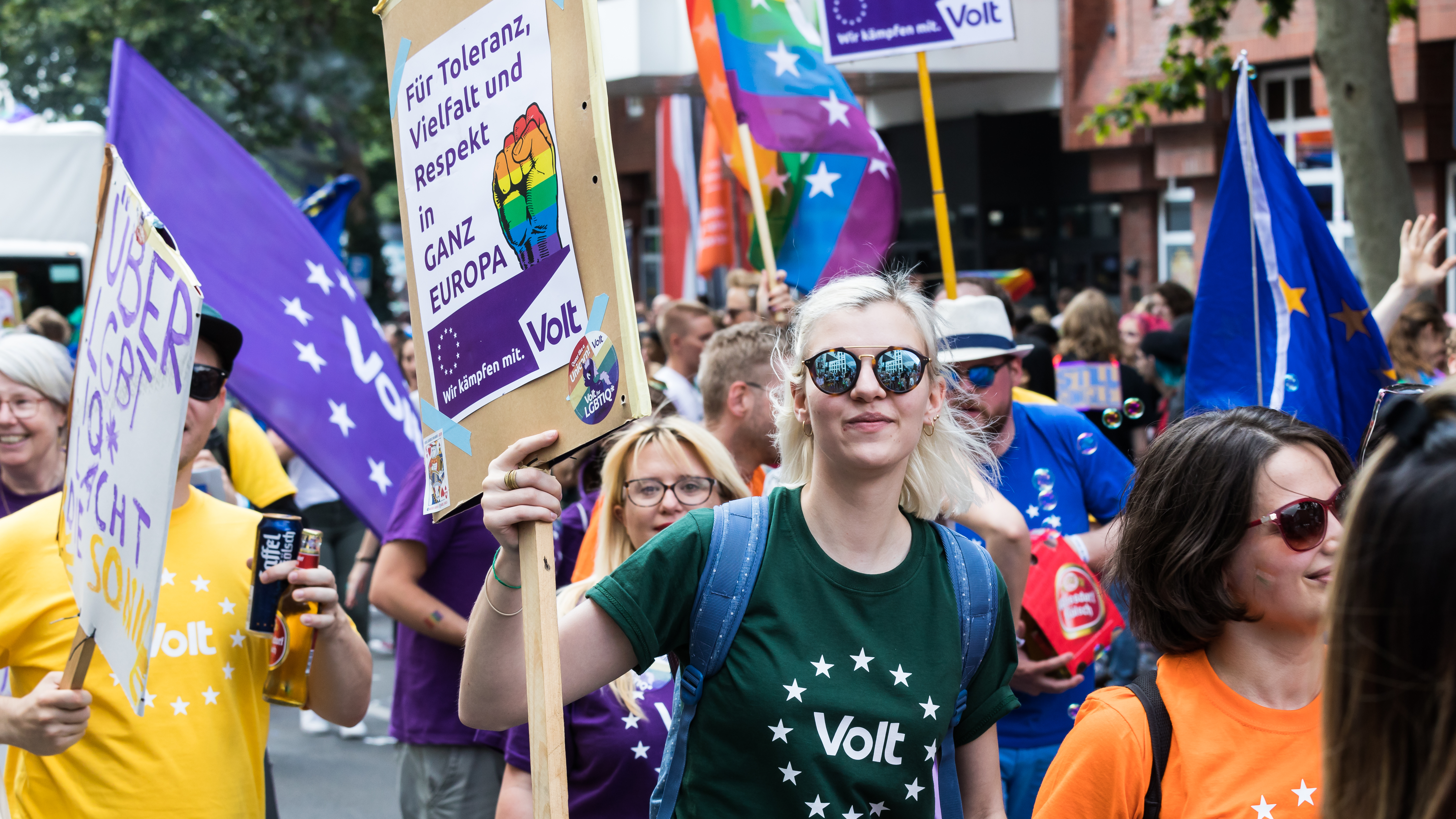
Volt at the CSD in Cologne 2019

The party is against discrimination of any kind and calls for direct support for those affected, inclusion of people with disabilities and plans to combat racism and antisemitism. With a progressive migration policy the party wants to ensure that migration is organized in a humane way and that refugees are able to improve their opportunities for participation.

Volt calls for a progressive asylum and immigration policy that consistently implements the human right to asylum and finds transparent regulations for immigration. Volt wants the EU to evolve in this area and achieve a common asylum policy.

==== Economic and financial policy ====
Volt judges the climate crisis and growing social inequalities to be the greatest dangers for the continent and Germany. Therefore, Volt combines green, liberal, and social elements in its economic policy. Its self-declared goal is an "ecologically-social and economically sustainable economy", a "sustainable and generation-appropriate market economy [...] that sees opportunities instead of obstacles in decarbonization, entrepreneurship, and digitalization." The party's economic policy is based on the principle of "sustainable development".

At the European level, the party wants to harmonize the EU's tax systems and reduce intra-European tax competition.

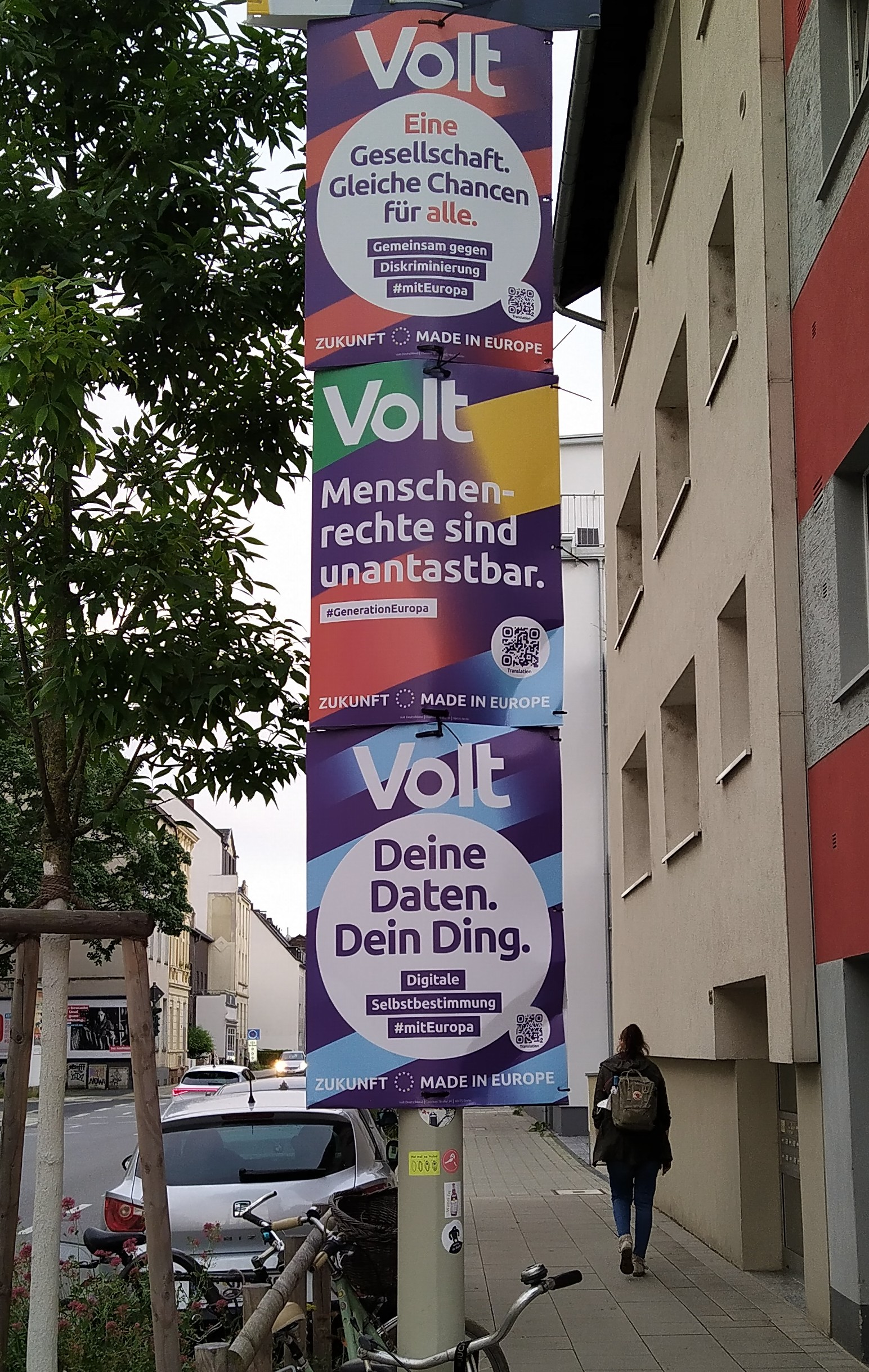
Election Posters Federal Election 2021

Volt demands the burden on small and medium incomes to be reduced. Bureaucracy must also be reduced and corporate tax rates lowered "towards a medium European level". In return, higher incomes should be taxed more heavily, as should profit from capital. Additionally, inheritance tax should be comprehensively reformed.

==== Digital policy ====
In terms of digital policy, Volt advocates the nationwide expansion of broadband connections and has set itself the goal of consistently digitizing the administration along the lines of Estonia. To this end, Volt plans to establish a Ministry for Digital Affairs, to which the Federal Office for Information Security would be subordinated.

In Volt's view, states should use the technological possibilities of our time to update public services in areas such as education, health care, and the judiciary.

At the European level, Volt opposes the use of upload filters and instead advocates for a unified European copyright law. Volt also calls for a safe and precautionary approach to artificial intelligence (AI), as well as ethical guidelines for AI research and use.

== Political classification ==
Party researcher Uwe Jun of the University of Trier assigns Volt to the left-liberal spectrum: "Above all conservative positions are missing." The party is described as "federal-European, progressive and social-liberal".

Professor Dorothea de Nève, a political scientist at the University of Giessen, attests that Volt appeals in particular to a younger and educated electorate to whom Europe is important. However, the party does not only want to appeal to a young, urban and educated clientele, but underpins its ambitions to reach as broad a spectrum of people as possible with its programs. With its pragmatic and evidence-based approach, Volt also appeals to people who are less concerned with arguing about ideologies and criticize the lack of effectiveness of politics in dealing with crises, according to Professor Thomas Zittel of Goethe University in Frankfurt.

With its program and the focus on the topic of Europe, Volt is stepping into a political gap, according to Professor Edgar Grande, a political scientist from Berlin. Up until now, Europe has been the subject of Eurosceptics in particular. The rest of the program, too, is a "very serious attempt to draw up a catalog of values for a progressive movement in the 21st century."

== Organisation ==
The organizational structure of Volt Germany follows that of classical parties. Special features of the organisational structure can be traced back to the pan-European character, which results in a transnational participation and organisational structure, which comes into play especially in the formulation of political positions and programmes. The federal association is made up of the federal executive committee and a federal finance council. Both, the executive committee and a court of arbitration, and an auditor are elected at the federal party conference.

The party subdivides itself into state associations and for the first time contested in the 2021 federal election in all federal states with state lists.

=== Volt Europa ===
Volt Germany is officially subordinate to the European parent organisation Volt Europa. Volt Europa consists of national organisations and parties from a total of 29 countries and entered the 2019 EU election with a unified election programme.

=== Party Executive Committee ===
Volt Germany's federal executive committee, elected in 2019, consisted of a dual leadership with Friederike Schier and Paul Loeper, four vice-chairpeople (Caroline Flohr, Sophie Griesbacher, Paulo Alexandre, Konstantin Feist) and treasurer Leo Lüddecke. At the December Party Congress 2021, Rebekka Müller and Connor Geiger were elected as the new designated chairpeople with four vice-chairpeople (Carina Beckmann, Jennifer Scharpenberg, Maximilian Ochs, Jens Többen). Likewise, the re-election of the incumbent treasurer Leo Lüdecke took place.

Board Number	Chairpersons	Regular Board Elections
5	Alexandra Barsuhn (since June 2026), Tim Marton (since April 2026); (Luca Loreen Kraft (until June 2026), Alast Mojtaheed Najafi (until November 2025))	May 2025
4	Anna Laura Tiessen (since March 2024); Eric Bischof (since December 2024); (Lara Neumann (until March 2024), Tim Marton (until December 2024))	June 2023
3	Rebekka Müller; Tim Marton (since January 2023); (Connor Geiger (until January 2023))	December 2021
2	Friederike Schier; Paul Loeper	September 2019
1	Valerie Sternberg; Benedikt Frey	March 2018

=== Members ===
Volt Germany's party members are often "younger and middle-aged, well-educated [as well as] internationally connected", with most members (about 70%) not having been politically active before joining Volt Germany. The party says it currently has over 10,000 members in Germany.

=== Finances ===
Volt's accounts for 2018 show income of around €53,056. This consisted of 16.5% from membership fees, 60% from donations from natural persons, 11.3% from legal entities as well as 12.2% from events, distribution of printed material and publications and other income-related activity. There was no donation that exceeded €4,000.

In 2019, the statement of accounts shows income of around €584,830. Membership fees accounted for 14.1%, 62.2% from donations from individuals, 7.1% from legal entities and 7.3% from income from events, distribution of printed matter and publications and other income-related activities. In addition, for the first time, there is income from state funds, which accounts for 8.9%. In total, the party received five donations over €10,000 in 2019, including for the first time a major donation from the entrepreneur Christian Burchard Max Oldendorff for €95,000. This was the first time the party appeared in the statistics for major donors.

In 2020, according to the statement of accounts, membership fees accounted for 21.5%. 30.9% were donations from individuals, 3% from legal entities, 0.7% from contributions from elected representatives, 0.6% from income from events, distribution of printed material and publications and other income-related activities. Forty three percent of the income came from state funds. In total, the party's income amounted to around €877,133.

==== Donations ====
In accordance with its donation and transparency guidelines, Volt Germany publishes all donations over €3,000, as a single donation or in the form of several donations added up over the year, on its website within 15 working days. As of 25 January 2022, there have been 43 such donations over €3,000 in the party's history.

== Regional associations ==
Volt Germany is organized nationwide in numerous local teams which, with the exception of a few spun-off district associations, do not form legally independent organizational units. The local teams are assigned to the respective state association.

State group		Founded	Chairperson	Latest result state election
Baden-Württemberg	Baden-Württemberg	July 2020	Oliver Barz, Jenny Maahs	0.9% (2026)
	Bavaria	February 2021	Laura Kuttler, Philipp Schmieder	0.3% (2023)
Berlin	Berlin	August 2020	Marie-Antonia Witzmann, Steffen Daniel Meyer	2.1% (2026)
Brandenburg	Brandenburg	March 2021	Evelyn Steffens, Benjamin Körner	0.4% (Note: As part of Plus Brandenburg) (2024)
Bremen	Bremen	March 2021	Anna Laura Tiessen, Maximilian Ochs	2.0% (2023)
Hamburg	Hamburg	October 2019	Mira Alexander, Kilian Muth	3.2% (2025)
Hesse	Hesse	August 2020	Teresa Kraft, Nico Richter	1.0% (2023)
Lower Saxony	Lower Saxony	September 2020	Manuela Paula Ritter, Connor Geiger	0.5% (2022)
Mecklenburg-Vorpommern	Mecklenburg-Vorpommern	September 2020	Martin Finck, Lisa Rieker	0.2% (2026)
North Rhine-Westphalia	North Rhine-Westphalia	October 2020	Elisabeth Maria Anna Leifgen, Tim Marton	0.6% (2022)
Rhineland-Palatinate	Rhineland-Palatinate	July 2020	Alexandra Barsuhn, Ron-David Roeder	1.1% (2026)
Saarland	Saarland	March 2021	Andreea Gheorghe, Martin Duda	0.6% (2022)
Saxony	Saxony	March 2021	Jessica Roitzsch, Toni Schmeida	
Saxony-Anhalt	Saxony-Anhalt	April 2021	Nathaniel Beifuss, Luisa Strackeljan	0.3% (2026)
Schleswig-Holstein	Schleswig-Holstein	April 2021	Scarlett Hurna, Christoph Thurner	0.3% (2022)
Thuringia	Thuringia	February 2020	Sophie Trautmann, Jonas Mazouz	

== Election results ==
Volt support in the 2024 European Parliament election in Germany

=== Federal parliament (Bundestag) ===
Election	Constituency		Party list		Seats	+/–	Government
Election	Votes	%	Votes	%	Seats	+/–	Government
2021	77,594	0.17 (#13)	164,272	0.35 (#14)	0 / 735	New	Extra-parliamentary
2025	391,577	0.79 (#9)	355,146	0.72 (#11)	0 / 630	0	Extra-parliamentary

=== European Parliament ===
Election	List leader	Votes	%	Seats	+/–	EP Group
2019	Damian Boeselager	249,098	0.67 (#13)	1 / 96	New	Greens/EFA
2024	Damian Boeselager; Nela Riehl	1,023,161	2.57 (#10)	3 / 96	▲2	Greens/EFA

=== Results timeline ===
Year	(Germany) DE	(European Union) EU	(Baden-Württemberg) BW	(Bavaria) BY	(Berlin) BE	(Brandenburg) BB	(Bremen (state)) HB	(Hamburg) HH	(Hesse) HE	(Lower Saxony) NI	(Mecklenburg-Vorpommern) MV	(North Rhine-Westphalia) NW	(Rhineland-Palatinate) RP	(Saarland) SL	(Saxony) SN	(Saxony-Anhalt) ST	(Schleswig-Holstein) SH	(Thuringia) TH
2019		▲0.7																
2020		▲0.7						▲1.3										
2021	▲0.4	▲0.7	▲0.5		▲1.1			▲1.3					▲1.0					
2022	▲0.4	▲0.7	▲0.5		▲1.1			▲1.3		▲0.5		▲0.6	▲1.0	▲0.6			▲0.3	
2023	▲0.4	▲0.7	▲0.5	▲0.3	▼0.9		▲2.0	▲1.3	▲1.0	▲0.5		▲0.6	▲1.0	▲0.6			▲0.3	
2024	▲0.4	▲2.6	▲0.5	▲0.3	▼0.9	▲0.4	▲2.0	▲1.3	▲1.0	▲0.5		▲0.6	▲1.0	▲0.6			▲0.3	
2025	▲0.7	▲2.6	▲0.5	▲0.3	▼0.9	▲0.4	▲2.0	▲3.2	▲1.0	▲0.5		▲0.6	▲1.0	▲0.6			▲0.3	
2026	▲0.7	▲2.6	▲0.9	▲0.3	▲2.1	▲0.4	▲2.0	▲3.2	▲1.0	▲0.5	▲0.2	▲0.6	▲1.1	▲0.6		▲0.3	▲0.3	
Year	(Germany) DE	(European Union) EU	(Baden-Württemberg) BW	(Bavaria) BY	(Berlin) BE	(Brandenburg) BB	(Bremen (state)) HB	(Hamburg) HH	(Hesse) HE	(Lower Saxony) NI	(Mecklenburg-Vorpommern) MV	(North Rhine-Westphalia) NW	(Rhineland-Palatinate) RP	(Saarland) SL	(Saxony) SN	(Saxony-Anhalt) ST	(Schleswig-Holstein) SH	(Thuringia) TH

== Prominent members ==
- Damian Boeselager (MEP since 2019)
- Rebekka Müller (Chairwoman 2022/23)
