= Kai Tegethoff =

German politician

Kai Tegethoff MEP
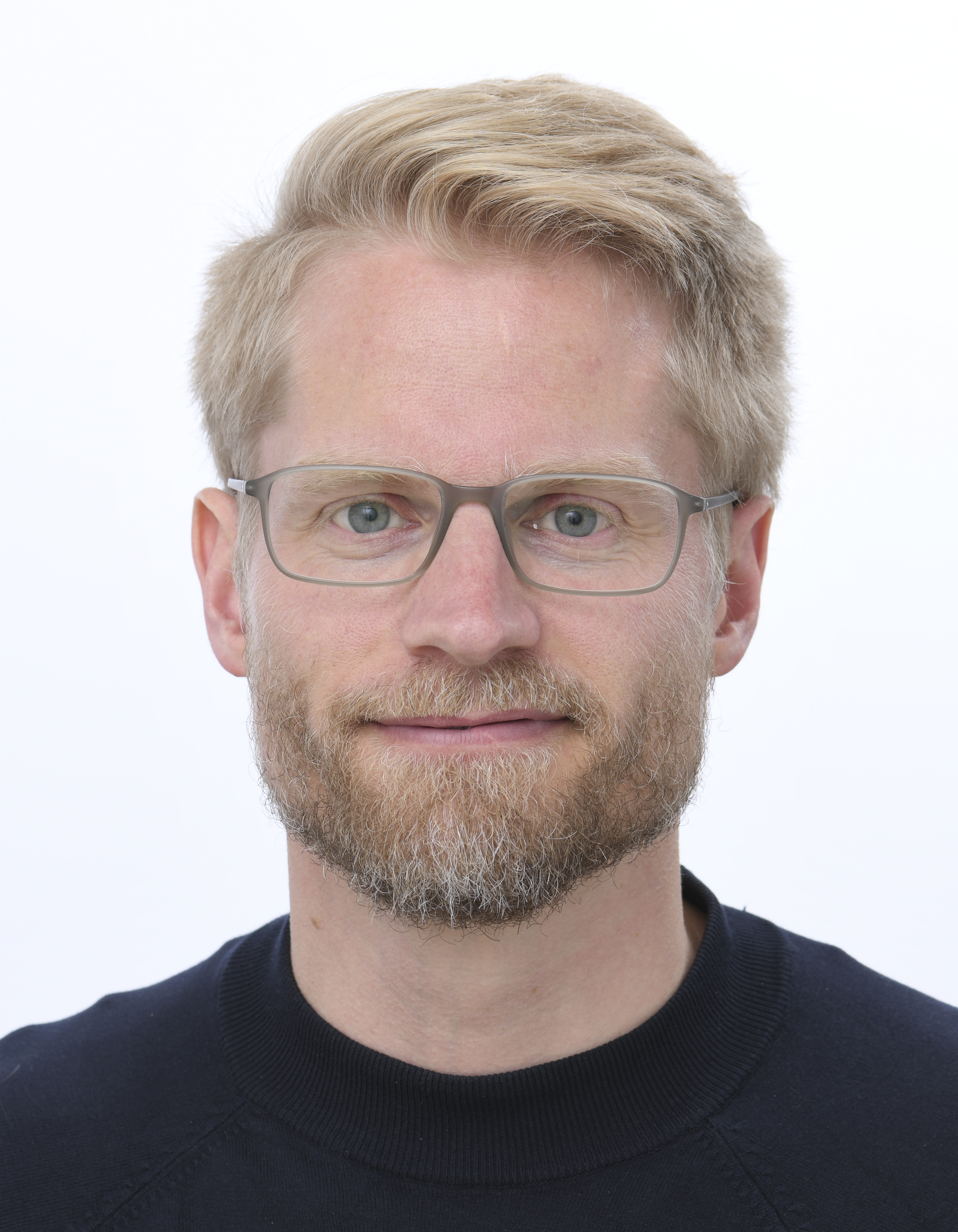

Member of the European Parliament for Germany
- Incumbent
- Assumed office 16 July 2024

Personal details
- Born: 19 July 1984 (age 41) Cologne, Germany
- Party: Volt Germany
- Other political affiliations: Volt Europa

Kai Rasmus Tegethoff (born 19 July 1984) is a German politician of Volt Europa. He has been a member of the European Parliament since 16 July 2024.

== Life ==
From 2004 to 2007, he studied philosophy and economics at the University of Bayreuth; from 2007 to 2009, he trained as a drafting technician; and from 2009 to 2013, Tegethoff studied civil engineering at Trier University of Applied Sciences. Between 2016 and 2021, Tegethoff was a research assistant at the Technical University of Braunschweig.

== Politics ==
=== Local Politics ===
Tegethoff ran as the lead candidate for the Volt party in the 2021 local elections in Braunschweig in the Westlicher Ring district and was elected to the city council, where he formed a joint group led by him with representatives from Die PARTEI and Die Linke. In the 2022 state election in Lower Saxony, he ran as a direct candidate in the Braunschweig-Nord constituency and received 1.3%.

=== European Parliament ===
On September 16, 2023, at the nomination convention in Erfurt, Tegethoff was elected to the third spot on the Volt party’s list for the 2024 European elections, making him part of the top four alongside Damian Boeselager, Nela Riehl, and Rebekka Müller.

In the election, Volt received 2.6%, enabling Tegethoff to win a seat in the European Parliament. On June 10, the day after the election, he announced that he would resign his city council seat in Braunschweig in order to focus fully on his work in the European Parliament.

In the European Parliament, Tegethoff is a member of the Committee on Transport and Tourism (TRAN).
