= Volt Slovenia =

Volt Slovenia Volt Slovenija
- Abbreviation: Volt
- Founders: Borja Ranzinger; Matic Bitenc; Sven Franck; Tilen Dragar
- Founded: 17 August 2022 (association); 11 April 2026 (officially registerred)
- Ideology: European federalism Progressivism; Pro-Europeanism
- Political position: Centre to centre-left
- European political alliance: Volt Europa
- Colours: Purple
- National Assembly: 0 / 90
- European Parliament: 0 / 9
- Mayors: 0 / 212
- Municipal councillors: 1 / 2,750

Website
- voltslovenija.org

Volt Slovenia (abbreviated as Volt; Slovene: Volt Slovenija) is a Slovenian political movement and political party, founded by Borja Ranzinger, Matic Bitenc, Sven Franck and Tilen Dragar. It is the Slovenian national branch of Volt Europa, a progressive and federalist European political alliance.

== History ==
=== Background ===
The pan-European federalist movement Volt Europa was founded on 29 March 2017 in response to the 2016 UK Brexit referendum, with the aim of advocating for a more integrated Europe. Volt Europa is a member of the Greens–European Free Alliance (G/EFA) political group of the European Parliament, with 5 MEPs: three from Germany and two from the Netherlands.

=== Volt Slovenia ===
The "European Political Association Volt Slovenia" was registered on 17 August 2022.

On 1 October 2025, representatives of the Volt movement, together with representatives of the Pirate Party of Slovenia, participated in a protest rally in front of the Ministry of the Interior building, with the aim of expressing opposition to the announced Chat Control regulation, which envisaged the introduction of control over the messages of all users.

On 12 November 2025, Borja Ranzinger, Matic Bitenc and Sven Franck announced at a press conference the start of the collection of 200 signatures for the registration of a Volt Slovenia political party. They expressed their belief that it was necessary to "bring into politics a new generation of people who can think and work beyond European borders and bring the best ideas from all over Europe to Slovenia." They also announced their candidacy in the 2026 parliamentary and local elections.

On 19 December 2025, at a pre-election event of the Pirate Party, the parties agreed to talk about a possible run in a joint list in the 2026 parliamentary election, although the cooperation later failed to materialize.

On 11 April 2026 the party was officially founded.

== Ideology ==
Volt Slovenia defines itself as a "pragmatic, reform-oriented and strongly pro-European party". It advocates the reform of the European Union with the aim of greater democracy, efficiency and the global role of Europe. It prioritizes digitalisation, education, science and innovation as the foundations of a "smart state", while supporting social equality, an inclusive society and the protection of human rights. It advocates active civic participation, greater transparency and the strengthening of democratic mechanisms, while supporting sustainable economic development, a green transition and a coordinated European foreign and security policy.
