= Volt France =

- Abbreviation: Volt
- President: Anne Grau, Sacha Courtial
- Chairperson: Robin Fontaine
- Secretary-General: Robin Fontaine
- Founded: 16 August 2018; 7 years ago
- Headquarters: Paris
- Ideology: European federalism Social liberalism Progressivism
- European political alliance: Volt Europa
- Colors: Purple

Website
- voltfrance.org

Volt France (abbreviation: Volt) is a social liberal political party in France and the French branch of Volt Europa.

== Policies ==
The main focus of Volt is the reform and further development of the European Union, which should become more transparent and participatory. The party wants to make the structures of the EU more democratic, have the EU President elected directly and a european government. The European Parliament should be given the right of initiative to enact laws itself and establish majority decisions in the European Council instead of unanimity.

This is to be accompanied by a common European security and defence policy, the promotion of the green economy and the strengthening of workers' rights.

Volt criticised the implementation of the pension reform and called for the continuation of debates in parliament and the organisation of public debates like the one on climate change in order to build public consensus and greater solidarity between generations.

The party is in favour of an accelerated ecological transformation and a sustainable economy with a focus on small and medium-sized enterprises. Volt is in favour of expanding Erasmus and promoting culture. Migration should be controlled at European level and EU countries should stand together in solidarity.

== History ==
Volt France was founded in February 2018 and officially registered as a party in August of the same year. The motivation for the founding was rising populism throughout Europe, which worried the founders and culminated in Brexit. Therefore, they felt it was their responsibility to take action to move Europe forward.

The party initially planned to contest the 2019 European elections with Colombe Cahen-Salvador and Louis Drounau as leading candidates and drew up a list for this. However, due to a lack of funding, the party was unable to contest. For the first time, the party contested the 2020 local elections in different cities.

In October 2021, Fabiola Conti and Sven Franck were elected as chairpersons. Cécile Richard and Adrien Copros were elected as their successors in September 2023.

== Elections ==
=== Local elections 2020 ===
Volt participated in the 2020 French municipal elections in some cities, but did not achieve a mandate:

- In Paris, Volt contested in the 9th district with its own list and achieved 0.52% in the first round.
- In Lyon, the party contested together with 100% Citoyens and they achieved 4.15% of the vote.
- In Lille, Volt stood for election in the alliance LilleVerte2020 together with l'EELV, Génération.s, Génération Écologie and Diem25. The list received 24.3% and 18 mandates, none of which, however, went to Volt.
- In Villeurbanne, Volt ran together with 100 % Citoyens and achieved 1.59 %.

=== Regional and local elections 2021 ===
Volt participated in the 2021 regional elections in the Île-de-France region with a list consisting of Volt, Pace-Nous Citoyen, A Nous al Démocatie and obtained 0.17% (3 629 votes). In the Hauts-de-France region, the joint list of Pace, Volt, Allons Enfants and Nous Citoyens reached 0.5% (6 700 votes). In both regions, the second round was not reached.

In Brittany, Volt put forward a joint list of LREM, TdP, MoDem, UDI, Agir and Volt, which achieved 15.53% in the first round, 14.75% in the second round and 9 mandates, none of which, however, went to Volt.

The party also participated in departmental elections in Strasbourg 1 (1.16%) and in Aix-en-Provence-2 (0.59%).

National sections of Volt Europa. The borders of the European Union are shown in red.

=== Legislative election 2022 ===
In the 2022 legislative elections, Volt participated in 12 of the 566 constituencies in France and overseas territories and in 5 of the 11 constituencies for French citizens abroad. In total, Volt was represented by candidates in 17 out of 577 constituencies.

The party achieved its best result in the national constituencies in the 5th constituency of the département of Pyrénées-Atlantiques with 3.25%. Volt's best overall election result was in the 7th constituency of the French Abroad (Central Europe) with 4.97%.

After the election, controversy arose in Nantes after some of the ballot papers for Volt were not delivered, so that in some polling stations no ballot papers for Volt were available. The party then filed a complaint with the Constitutional Council.

=== European election 2024 ===
In October 2023, the party nominated Sven Franck and Rayna Stamboliyska as top candidates for the European elections 2024. On 8 February, Volt announced together with the parties Régions et peuples solidaires and Parti radical de gauche that they would be cooperating in the European elections and running with a joint list. In March, the parties presented their joint list Europe Territoires Écologie, which, alongside Volt, consists of the Parti radical de gauche, Régions et Peuples Solidaires, Collectif des social-démocrates réformateurs, Movement of Progressives and Citizens' Movement.

To remind people of the value of going to the polls and to emphasise the importance of Europe, representatives of the party crossed France in February with a European flag along the path of the Olympic flame.

=== Legislative election 2024 ===
Following the dissolution of the National Assembly by french President Emmanuel Macron, and subsequent snap election, Volt France ran candidates in 22of the 577 constituencies but did not win any seats.

The party once again achieved its best result in the 7th constituency of French Abroad where their candidate Cécile Richard won 5.53% of the vote with 3211 votes

=== Local elections 2026 ===
Volt participated in the 2026 french municipal elections in multiple towns and cities :

- In Paris, Volt ran its own list led by Matiss Hyenveux in the 5th arrondissement where it achieved 0.85% of the vote with 85 votes in the first round failing to qualify for the second round and win any seats.

In the rest of France Volt ran candidates on lists led by other parties or on non-partisan citizen-led lists :

- In L'Hermitage, Volt candidate Mathias Langner was elected on the list L'Hermitage, citoyenne, écologique et solidaire which ran uncontested and obtained 1252 votes in the first and only round.
- In Vendôme, Volt candidate Robin Thomass ran on the list Liste Dynamique Vendômoise which came second achieving 21.82% of the vote with 1313 votes in the first and only round giving the list 3 seats, none of which went to Volt due to their standing on the list.
- In Strasbourg, Volt candidate Camille Marteau was elected on the list Pour Strasbourg led by the Socialist Party's Catherine Trautmann which came first in the second round winning 37% of the vote with 32,867 votes in the second round giving the list 45 seats in the municipal council.
- In Mulhouse, Volt candidate David Dolui ran on the list Mulhouse en commun avec Loïc Minéry which came second in the second round achieving 21.37% of the vote with 4934 votes in the winning 6 seats, none of which went to Volt due to their standing on the list.
- In Lambersart, Volt candidate Franck Boyaval ran on the list Lambersart en commun which came third in the second round achieving 13.71% of the vote with 1503 votes giving the list 2 seats, none of which went to Volt due to their standing on the list.
- In Lille, where Volt had previously run on a list with Les Écologistes (formerly known as EELV), Volt candidate Verena Priem ran on the list TOUT POUR LILLE DEMAIN led by the Socialist Party's Arnaud Deslandes which came first in the second round achieving 49.33% of the vote with 32,083 votes giving the list 47 seats, none of which went to Volt due to their standing on the list.

Volt France finished the election with 2 municipal councilors marking the party's first elected officials in the country.

== Election results ==
=== European Parliament ===
Election	Leader	Votes	%	Seats	+/−	EP Group
2024 (Note: Run in a joint list with PRG, R&PS, MDP, MDC and CSDR, that won no seats.)	Guillaume Lacroix	63,006	0.26 (#17)	0 / 81	New	−
