= Rebekka Müller =

German politician

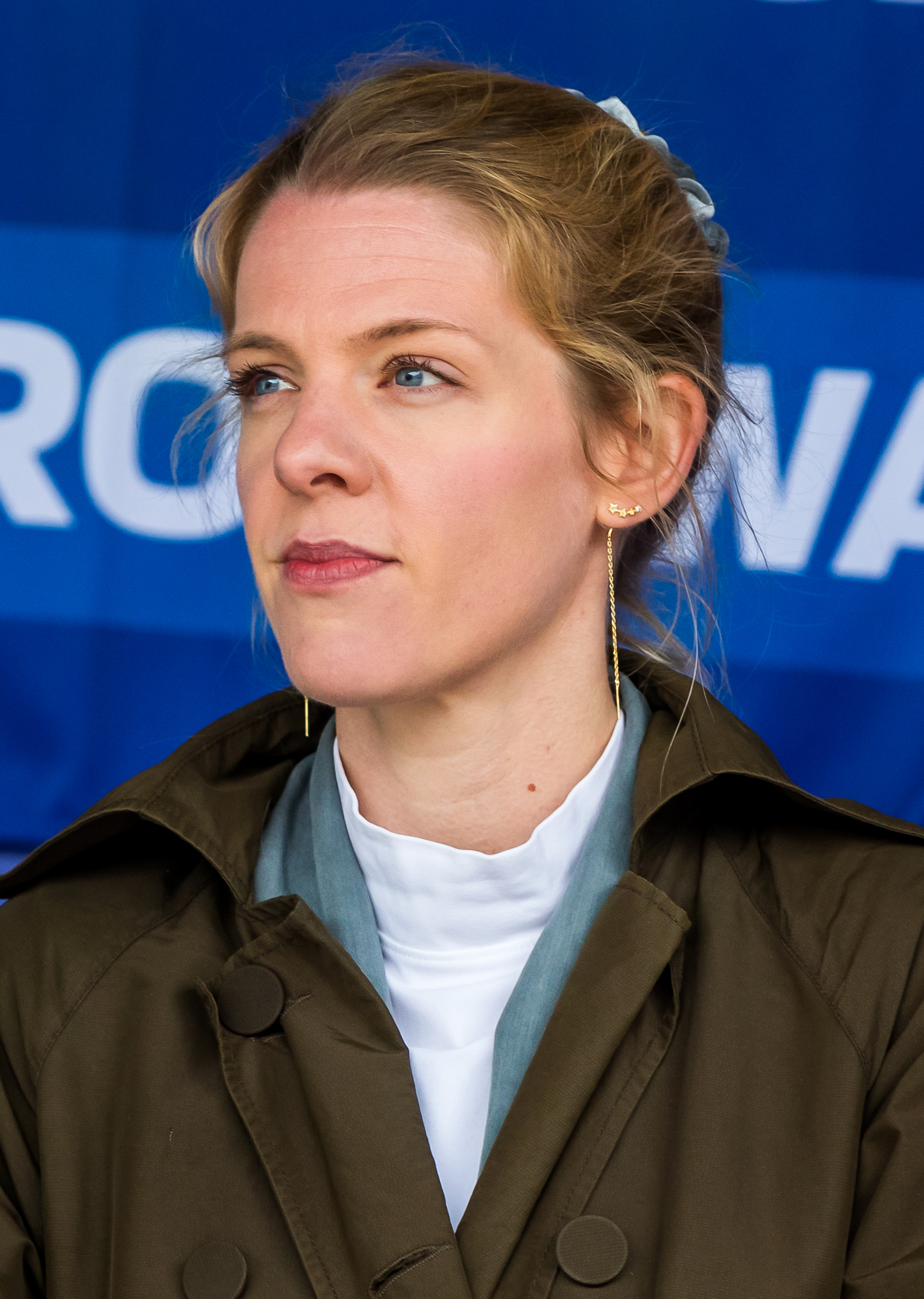

Co-President of Volt Germany
- In office 5 December 2021 – 25 June 2023

Personal details
- Born: 1988 (age 37–38) Berlin, Germany
- Party: Volt Germany (since 2019)
- Children: 1
- Education: Master's degree in business administration
- Alma mater: Free University of Berlin; Zeppelin University

Rebekka Müller (born 1988 in Berlin) is a German politician of the Volt party. She was the federal chairwoman of Volt from January 2022 to June 2023. She was also the party's federal lead candidate in the 2021 Bundestag elections and a member of the top quartet in the 2024 European elections.

== Career ==
Rebekka Müller initially studied business administration at the Free University of Berlin from 2008 to 2011, where she completed her bachelor's degree, and then went on to complete a master's degree at the private Zeppelin University in Friedrichshafen from 2011 to 2014. Müller then worked as a management consultant and project manager in the energy sector.

As a result of Brexit, the election of Donald Trump and the Fridays for Future protests, Müller decided she needed to become politically active herself and joined Volt in 2019. According to media reports, she gave up her job in 2020 to become a full-time volunteer. In 2020, Müller ran in the local elections in Cologne as a direct candidate for the Ehrenfeld 5 constituency and was number 5 on the party's list. During the local elections, she was the "city lead" in Cologne and responsible for the campaign. She has since been a member of the expert citizens' committee for real estate for the Volt parliamentary group on Cologne city council.

In 2021, Müller was Volt's federal lead candidate in the Bundestag election alongside Bamberg city councillor Hans-Günter Brünker. Müller was federal chair of Volt Germany in 2022 together with Connor Geiger, and after his resignation in December 2022 from January to June 2023 together with Tim Marton. Together with JoinPolitics, she initiated the Team Europe support programme to promote political talent and, in particular, diversity in the political landscape.

She announced that she would not be standing for the chairmanship again at the federal party conference on 24 June 2023 due to her planned candidacy for the European elections. Lara Neumann was elected as her successor. At the constellation meeting in Erfurt on 16 September, Müller was elected as part of a top quartet for the 2024 European elections. The top quartet also includes Damian Boeselager, Nela Riehl and Kai Tegethoff.

== Political positions ==
Müller is particularly committed to climate protection. Her goal is to ensure that the 1.5° degree target is met and that Europe is CO2-neutral by 2035 and climate-neutral by 2040. To this end, it wants to expand socially designed CO2 pricing and renewable energies and promote affordable, climate-neutral housing.

Müller sees digitalisation and artificial intelligence as a central building block for progress in climate protection and economic development.

She wants to promote entrepreneurship and innovation. For example, start-ups are to be promoted by reducing bureaucracy and providing targeted venture capital in the early stages. Corporate taxes are to be harmonised within the EU.

=== European policy ===
Müller favours the establishment of a European republic with a government and prime minister elected by the European Parliament, a European constitution and a common foreign and financial policy. The European Parliament should be given the right of initiative.

== Personal life ==
Müller lives in Cologne. She is a vegetarian.

Müller became the mother of a child in early 2023. Despite this, she remains politically active and ran for the 2024 European elections. In her opinion, motherhood should not be a career obstacle – as it is in other professions.
