= Sven Franck =

German-French politician

Co-President of Volt Europa
- Incumbent
- Assumed office June 2026

Co-President of Volt France
- In office October 2021 – 16. September 2023

Personal details
- Born: 1976 (age 49–50) Erlangen
- Party: Volt France (since 2018); Volt Slovenia (since 2026, co-founder)
- Education: Master's degree in business administration
- Alma mater: University of Regensburg, Murray State University

Sven Franck (born 1976 in Erlangen) is a German-French politician (Volt) of German origin. From 2021 to 2023, he served as co-chair of the party alongside Fabiola Conti and was elected lead candidate for the 2024 European Parliament elections in October 2023. Since June 2026 he is Co-President of Volt Europa.

== Career ==
Franck was born in Erlangen in 1976 and grew up in Bayreuth. After completing his A-levels, he studied Business Administration at the University of Regensburg from 1997 to 2002, specialising in marketing, finance and innovation management, and graduated with a diploma. He also studied Business Administration at Murray State University from 1999 to 2000, completing his studies with a master's degree. After graduating, Franck initially worked in his parents’ family business in the swimwear industry from 2003 to 2009, before founding a start-up in the IT sector. In 2012, he moved to Lille and joined the open-source software company Nexedi SA, where Franck has since worked as a project manager for research projects and as head of marketing. In 2025, Franck moved with his wife to her home country of Slovenia.

== Political work ==
Franck joined Volt France in 2018 to counter populism and the far right. In 2020, he stood in the local elections with Volt as part of the LilleVerte2020 alliance, alongside l'EELV, Génération.s, Génération Écologie and Diem25, and served on the district council from 2020 to 2023. In 2021, Franck was elected co-chair of the party alongside Fabiola Conti[9] and in October 2023 became Volt France's lead candidate for the 2024 European elections. As part of the election campaign, Franck travelled across France following in the footsteps of the Olympic flame to highlight the importance of Europe. In March 2024, Volt, together with other parties, announced the formation of the Europe Territoires Écologie coalition, on whose joint list Franck holds the seventh position. In April 2024, Franck was elected as part of Volt Europe's transnational list for the 2024 European elections. In 2025, Franck moved to Slovenia with his wife, where he is supporting the establishment of Volt Slovenia and is a co-founder of the party.

Franck was elected as Co-President of Volt Europa in June 2026. In his campaign, he called for Volt to be seen once again more as a social movement rather than just a political party, in order to build social pressure and bring about social change.

== Political positions ==
=== European Union ===
In order to reduce the European Union's dependence on its member states, Franck advocates providing independent funding for the EU institutions and has proposed various options to this end, such as a European corporation tax, a European solidarity surcharge modelled on the German system, or a carbon tax at EU level based on the French model.

In the medium term, France's seat on the UN Security Council should be transferred to the EU so that it can sit on an equal footing with the US, Russia and China. The European Treaties should be amended to enable EU reforms, such as the introduction of a right of initiative for the European Parliament. Franck also supports the establishment of a European army to replace the national armies of the current 27 EU member states, in order to address current security challenges that no single state can resolve on its own.

=== Digitalisation ===
Franck advocates for open-source solutions in the field of digitalisation. He regards these as a prerequisite for interoperability. With regard to Gaia-X, Franck warned that opening the project up to the world's largest technology companies could weaken European technology providers and thus undermine the aim of strengthening the European digital ecosystem and European sovereignty. He sees the development of artificial intelligence as an opportunity for real-time translation, enabling everyone to retain their mother tongue in international exchanges and thereby preserving linguistic diversity.

== Personal life ==
Franck is married to a Slovenian woman. He sits on the board of the association for the town twinning between Lille, Cologne and Erfurt.
