= Volt Europa =

Federalist European political alliance

- Abbreviation: Volt
- President: Inês Bravo Figueiredo (PT), co-president Sven Franck (DE), co-president
- Founded: 29 March 2017; 9 years ago
- Headquarters: Boulevard Bischoffsheim n° 39 boîte 4; 1000 Brussels, Belgium
- Youth wing: Volt Violet
- Membership (2026): 34,000
- Ideology: European federalism; Pan-Europeanism; Progressivism; Social liberalism
- Political position: Centre to centre-left
- European Parliament group: Greens/EFA (since 2019)
- Colours: Purple
- European Parliament: 5 / 720
- European Commission: 0 / 27
- European Council: 0 / 27
- European Lower Houses: 1 / 6,217
- European Upper Houses: 2 / 1,459

Website
- volteuropa.org

Volt Europa (known mononymously as Volt) is a transnational pro-European and federalist European political movement. It operates as a pan-European umbrella for subsidiary parties sharing the same name and branding.

Volt aligns its political positions across Europe, presenting a common, pan-European manifesto. In the 2019 European Parliament elections, Volt ran in eight member states with a shared platform, emphasising solutions to supranational challenges, such as climate change, defense, energy policy, migration, economic inequality, terrorism, welfare, and the technological evolution of the labor market. The party advocates for a stronger, more integrated European Union, with the long-term goal of creating a federal Europe. Additionally, Volt endorses the formation of a European army, joint European debt and taxes, nuclear energy including the construction of new nuclear power plants, and stronger economic solidarity between the EU member states.

Initially using the slogan "Neither left nor right", Volt is now generally perceived as centrist or centre-left, with a core focus on evidence-based policy and best-practice sharing among EU countries and municipalities. It campaigns on these principles in both local and national elections.

Founded in March 2017, Volt's first national subsidiary party was established in Hamburg, Germany, a year later. Since then, Volt has developed local teams in all EU member states, as well as in non-EU countries like Albania, Switzerland, Kosovo, Ukraine, and the United Kingdom. Volt subsidiaries are now registered political parties in many of these countries, most recently expanding to Cyprus, Romania and Slovenia.

Despite its organisation and being referred to as a "European party" or "transnational party", Volt does not yet meet the requirements to register as a European political party.

== History ==
=== Foundation ===
National sections of Volt Europa. The borders of the European Union are shown in red.

Volt Europa was founded on 29 March 2017 by Andrea Venzon, Colombe Cahen-Salvador, and Damian Boeselager, on the same day that the United Kingdom formally announced its intention to leave the European Union under Article 50 of the Treaty on European Union. According to their own statement, Volt's foundation was a reaction to growing populism in the world as well as to Brexit. Venzon became founding President, Boeselager Vice President, and Cahen-Salvador policy lead.

=== 2019 European Parliament election ===
European elections 2019 promo by Volt Netherlands, May 2019

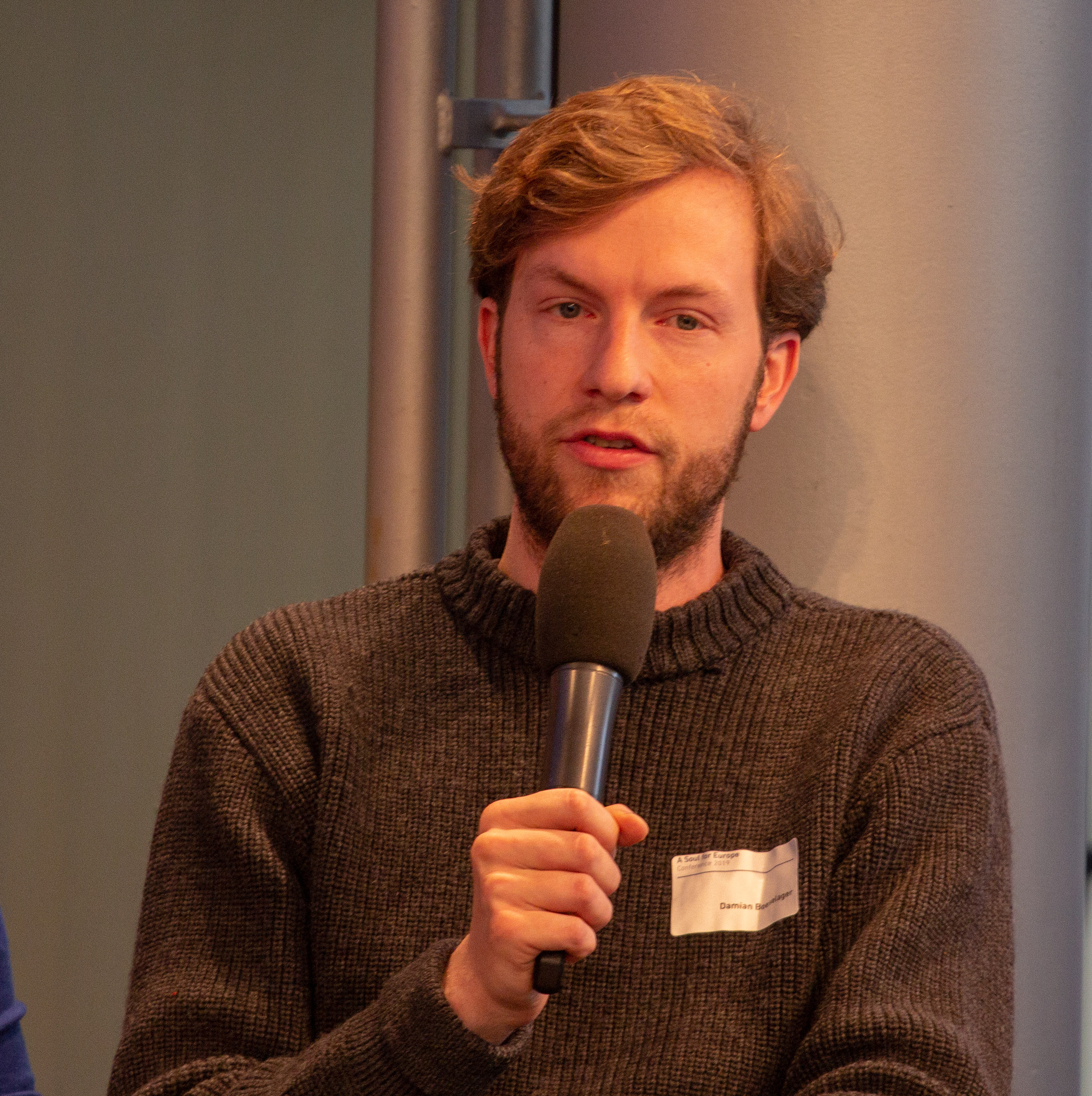
Damian Boeselager, Volt's first Member of the European Parliament

Between 27 and 28 October 2018, Volt Europa hosted its General Assembly meeting in Amsterdam, agreeing its Amsterdam Declaration, which also served as its manifesto programme for the European Parliament elections. The party previously gathered in Berlin, Bucharest, and Paris.

Between 22 and 24 March 2019, Volt Europa hosted its first European Congress in Rome, presenting its candidates for the 2019 European Parliament election. The keynote speakers list included Paolo Gentiloni (former Prime Minister of Italy and President of the Italian Democratic Party), Emma Bonino (Italian senator and former European Commissioner for Health and Food Safety), Enrico Giovannini (former Italian Government minister), Marcella Panucci (Director General of the General Confederation of Italian Industry), Sandro Gozi (President of the Union of European Federalists) and Antonio Navarra (President of the Mediterranean Center for Climate Change).

During the European Parliament elections in May 2019, the party won one seat by winning 0.7 percent of votes in Germany, with Damian Boeselager its first Member of the European Parliament.

On 9 June 2019, following a pan-European vote of party members, Volt elected to join the Greens–European Free Alliance group in the European Parliament. In the future, Volt hopes to be able to form its own political group in the European Parliament, which would require a minimum of 25 MEPs from at least seven different member states.

=== Election of new board and first pan-European digital assembly ===
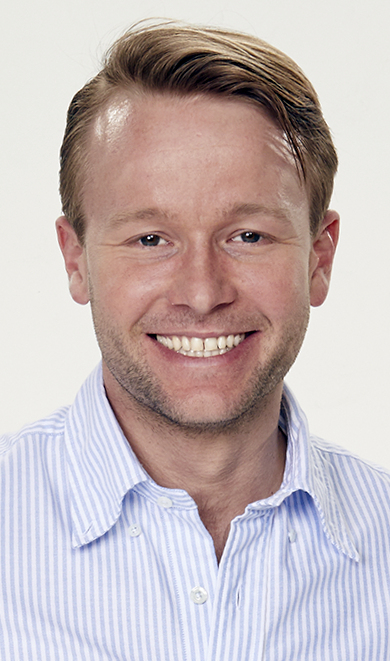
Reinier van Lanschot, Volt Europa's co-president 2019–2023

From 12 to 13 October 2019, Volt Europa hosted its general assembly in Sofia to elect the new board of Volt Europa. While Volt up to that point had been an ASBL non-profit with only few registered members, based in Luxembourg, it was transformed into an international non-profit organization (AISBL) according to Belgian law. In the AISBL structure all members of the Volt movement, as well as the national subsidiaries could become voting members. The statutes of Volt Europa lay out a general assembly, open to all members, which decides on important issues, and elects a gender-balanced board of nine directors.

Volt's Spring 2020 general assembly was scheduled to take place in Lisbon, but due to the COVID-19 pandemic, the party held a digital general assembly, which included a decision on its programme until 2024.

From 16 to 17 October 2021, Volt Europa hosted its General Assembly in Lisbon, Portugal, the first physical General Assembly since 2019. During the 2021 General Assembly, Reinier van Lanschot who had been co-president since the General Assembly in Sofia 2019, was reelected. Francesca Romana D'Antuono from Italy was elected as co-president. Johannes Heinrich from Switzerland was elected as treasurer. The six non-executive board members elected were: Ines Consonni, Anouk Ooms, Lucia Nass, Thor Larholm, Charles Evain and Lucas Amorelli Ribeiro Kornexl.

=== 2024 European Parliament election ===
On 27 November 2023, Volt adopted its joint European election programme during its General Assembly in Paris. At a subsequent meeting in Brussels on 7 April 2024, the party elected Sophie in 't Veld and Damian Boeselager as its lead candidates for the 2024 European Parliament elections, also choosing a symbolic transnational list.

Following the election, Volt increased its number of seats from 2 to 5, with 3 seats from Germany and 2 from the Netherlands. Volt announced that it would engage in negotiations with both the Greens/EFA and Renew Europe groups in the European Parliament and would let its members vote on which group to join. Upon a unanimous recommendation by its newly elected MEPs, 87% of voting party members chose to remain affiliated with the Greens/EFA group.

== Name ==
Volt Europa was incorporated as a non-profit association (ASBL) in Luxembourg under the name "Volt Europa", abandoning a previous name of Vox Europe to avoid any confusion with a similarly named far-right Spanish party.

"Volt" was chosen as a name due to its similarity to the initial name and the added meaning of figuratively bringing voltage into politics. Added to that, both the term "Volt" and the Latin version of the name of the European continent are understood in all European languages, hence as a transcontinental movement, Volt Europa does not need to translate its own name, except for languages where non-Latin alphabets are used (like Bulgarian, Greek, and Ukrainian).

== Ideology ==
In 2018, Volt identified "the 5+1 fundamental challenges", which it has identified as crucial for an improvement of the European Union:

- Smart state – Digitalisation of public services
- Economic renaissance – a blend of circular, green and blue economic models
- Social equality – Human rights, equality of opportunity, gender equality, and tolerance of cultural differences
- Global balance – Sustainable and responsible policies in farming and trade, measures to address climate change and refugee crises, and support for labour migration and development cooperation
- Citizen empowerment – Greater subsidiarity, social responsibility, and participatory democracy
- European reform – Federation of EU states, with greater responsibilities for its regions and cities

On economic issues, Volt Europa supports digitisation, investment in the green and blue economy, measures to address poverty and inequality (including a European minimum income of at least 40% of the median wage), a more integrated European tax system with exclusively European taxes, and the use of public-private partnerships; it also supports increased spending on welfare, in particular related to education and healthcare. Volt has supported a European Basic Income (EBI), based on a "negative tax system". In this model, individuals earning below a set threshold receive payments instead of paying taxes, providing a safety net and incentivizing work. Volt argues that the legal basis for an EBI is already established under Article 107 of the Treaty on the Functioning of the European Union (TFEU), and that its implementation would harmonize member states' welfare systems.

Volt supports a number of policies intended to promote social equality. This includes gender quotas in the public sector and the boards of publicly traded companies. They also support publicly funded transgender therapy, and oppose the term "race".

Volt also supports deep reforms to EU institutions, including common management of migration and border protection, a European army, and European debt and taxation. It argues that a European army should be established and that the relationship between the EU and NATO should be reviewed and balanced.

Volt supports the idea of a federal Europe with a strong European Parliament, in order to create a united European voice on the global stage. There should be a European government, elected and accountable to the parliament, instead of a European commission. The European election law should be uniform across all member states, the European parliament should gain the right to initiate laws, and the European Council should be transformed into a second chamber with regressive voting weights to balance the dominance of larger states. Volt supports a referendum across all member states, which legitimizes such a constitution for the set of agreeing member states to form a core union, even if not every member state agrees.

In terms of environmental policy, Volt has committed to the 1.5 °C (2.7 °F) target of the Paris Agreement. To implement the target, Volt proposes a broad certificate trading scheme, the proceeds of which should be redistributed to citizens. Volt supports investment into nuclear power for maintenance and new reactors if safety standards are met. A European energy grid is promoted to integrate production and distribution in the European single market.

As opposed to other movements promoting European integration, such as Pulse of Europe or the European Federalists, Volt has participated in elections on all levels of government as a political party. Its first major objective was the European Parliament elections in May 2019. Volt has participated successfully in local, (Note: Renew Scotland contested in five regions and no constituencies in the 2021 Scottish Parliament election.) national, and European elections.

In 2024, Volt published the "Electoral Moonshot Programme", its electoral programme for the 2024 European elections, with comprehensive policy proposals organised in five pillars: Europe's geopolitical leadership, quality of life, humane migration, making votes count, and a liveable planet. The program is available in 7 languages.

== Organisation and governance ==
The structure of Volt Europa is similar to parties in federal political systems, such as Germany. Volt Europa is registered as an international non-profit (AISBL), according to Belgian law. The membership of Volt Europa consists of both the local political branches, which are often incorporated according to national law, elect a local leadership, and often have further sub-levels, as well as all individual members. Individual members thus often have double membership of both Volt Europa and a national branch.

The highest authority of the party is the General Assembly, which consists of all AISBL members and can pass motions on all matters relating to the organization. The General Assembly is open without a delegate system although some local branches use delegate systems (e.g. Volt Germany). A five-member intra-party legal board (Conflict Resolution Body) is elected by the General Assembly.

All membership associations of Volt Europa send representatives to the Country Council, whose formal role is restricted to deciding on the admission of new membership associations and political alliances on the European level. However, informally the Country Council plays an important role in advising and overseeing the work of the European Board.

=== Co-Presidents of Volt Europa ===
Co-presidents
Year	Name	Country Chapter	Term
2017–2019	Andrea Venzon	Volt Italy	1st
2017–2019	Damian Boeselager	Volt Germany	1st
2019–2021	Valerie Sternberg	Volt Germany	1st
2019–2021	Reinier van Lanschot	Volt Nederland	1st
2021–2023	Reinier van Lanschot	Volt Nederland	2nd
2021–2023	Francesca Romana D'Antuono	Volt Italy	1st
2023–2026	Francesca Romana D'Antuono	Volt Italy	2nd
2023–2026	Mels Klabbers	Volt Nederland	1st
2026–2029	Inês Bravo Figueiredo	Volt Portugal	1st
2026–2029	Sven Franck	Volt France / Volt Slovenia	1st

== Funding ==
According to the party's financial accounts, it generates most of its income through membership fees and donations. National chapters provide 25% of their membership fees to Volt Europa to finance its operation. Volt claims to publish every donation exceeding €3,000 per donation or donor per year within 15 days from its receipt on the party's website and that its national and local chapters adhere to the same standard. On 9 May 2021, Volt announced that they had raised €40,000 in three weeks in a fundraising drive ahead of the 2024 European Parliament election.

Volt has received several large donations from firms in the housing and start-up sectors. Its biggest donors are Elastic founder Steven Schuurman with €500,000 via his Dreamery foundation, Marc Dreesmann, heir to Anton Dreesmann of Dutch retail company Vroom & Dreesmann with around €160,000, and Christian Oldendorff, heir to German shipping firm Oldendorff Carriers with around €120,000. TomTom founder Peter-Frans Pauwels has donated €100,000. The NGO JoinPolitics has donated €50,000 to Volt Germany for a joint project ("Team Europa") to mobilize minority candidates for the European elections.

== National sections ==
=== Albania ===
Volt Albania (Albanian: Volt Shqipëri) is not registered as a party in Albania, but engages as a movement on the ground and participates at the European level of Volt.

=== Austria ===
Volt Austria (German: Volt Österreich) is Volt's registered political party in Austria. The party planned to take part in the European elections in 2019, but did not succeed in collecting the required 2,600 signatures in time to qualify for the ballot. Since then, the party contested some local elections, but did not receive a mandate. It intended to partake in the 2024 European Elections and promised to give two of the people who signed tickets to a Taylor Swift concert, but was not proven effective as the party did not gain enough signatures.

=== Belgium ===
Volt Belgium (Dutch: Volt België, French: Volt Belgique, German: Volt Belgien) is Volt's registered political party in Belgium. Volt Belgium was the first section to participate in elections, when they took part in the 2018 Belgian local elections in Ixelles, Etterbeek and also shared a list with the local Pirate Party (Paars) for Antwerp. During the 2019 European Parliament elections, Volt participated in the Dutch Speaking electoral college, receiving 0.48% of the vote, not enough for a seat.

=== Bulgaria ===
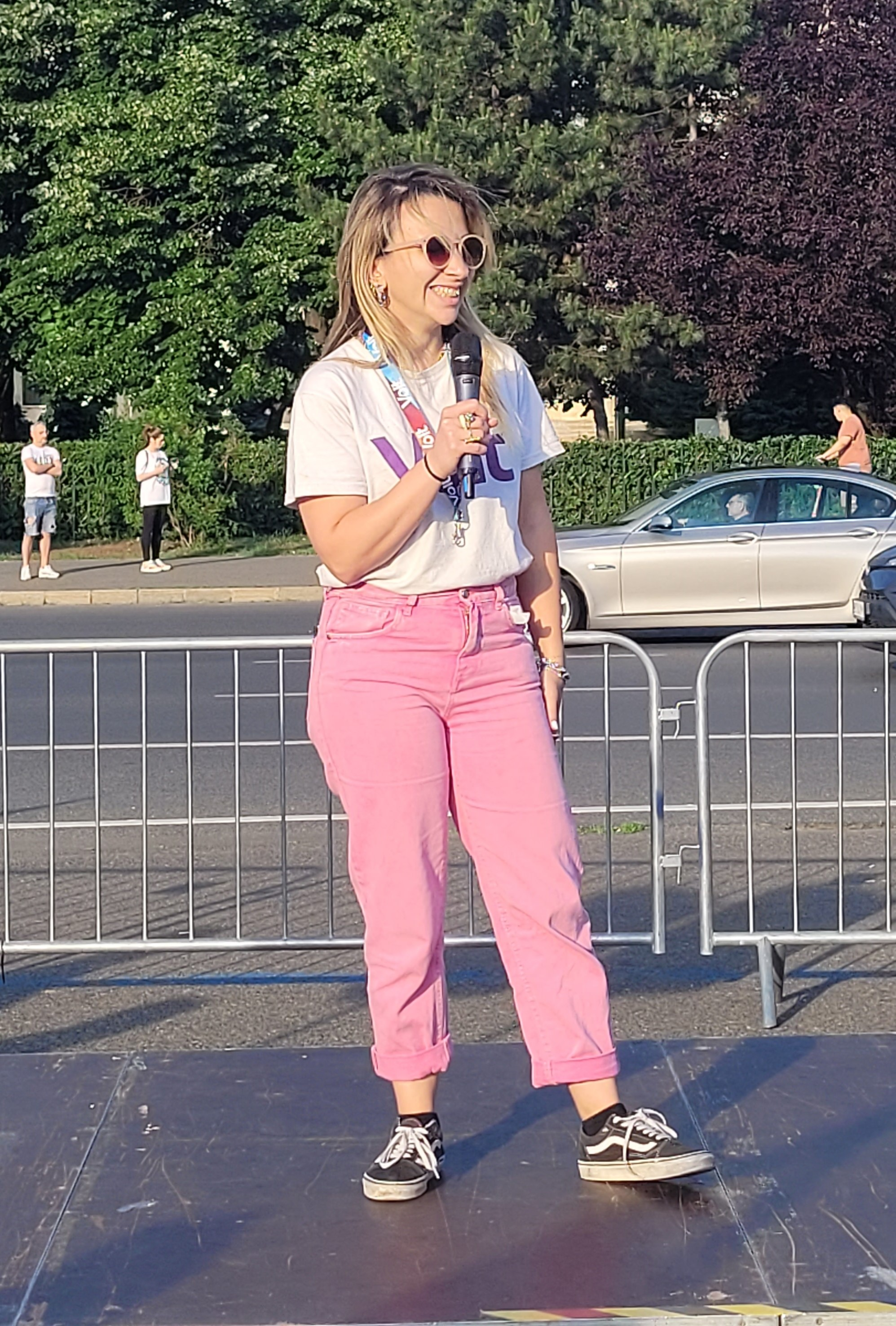
Francesca Romana D'Antuono, co-president since 2021

Volt Bulgaria participated in all three Bulgarian parliamentary elections in 2021, the first two as part of the anti-government coalition ISMV then under PP for the third election. ISMV won seats in both elections, but none of them were allocated to members of Volt. (Note: ISMV coalition won 13 seats in parliament in the July 2021 Bulgarian parliamentary election, none of which were allocated to members of Volt.) (Note: ISMV coalition won 14 seats in parliament in the April 2021 Bulgarian parliamentary election, none of which were allocated to members of Volt.) PP won the November 2021 election and thus Volt gained two seats, which it defended in the election in October 2022. Nastimir Ananiev served as the chair of the parliamentary committee of the Regional Committee, as well as deputy chair of the PP parliamentary group, while Ventsislava Lyubenova served as chair of the foreign relations committee. In the 2024 Parliamentary Elections the party lost its mandate in parliament.

=== Cyprus ===
Volt Cyprus was founded on 3 December 2023. In November 2023, MP Alexandra Attalides announced her intention to join Volt and was subsequently elected co-president at the party's founding congress. The party is fully active in the Cypriot political system and participates in local and European elections. In the 2024 European elections, the party gained 2.9% of the vote and thus did not win a seat.

=== Czech Republic ===
Volt was founded 2019 and operated from 11 April 2021 to 28 June 2022 in the Czech Republic as the registered association Volt Česká republika, z.s, with Karolina Machová and Adam Hanka as the chairs of the association and Jan Klátil as the treasurer. Volt is now registered as political party Volt Česko.

In the 2022 local elections in Prague, the party contested an election for the first time. Volt received 4,816 votes (0.14%) and thus did not win a mandate.

=== Denmark ===
The Danish chapter of Volt, Volt Danmark, was founded on 21 July 2018. The party contested an election for the first time in November 2021 with the municipal election in Frederiksberg. Volt received 105 votes (0.2%) and thus did not win a mandate. The party needs 21,195 digital signatures to be eligible for national elections, as well as 70,680 to run in the 2024 European Elections.

=== Estonia ===
Former President of Estonia and Minister of Foreign Affairs, Toomas Hendrik Ilves, joined Volt Europa on 10 April 2025, breaking a previous pledge to not affiliate to any political party. He defended this by saying "to my mind (Volt) stands for all of what I believe", and "I share the values embodied in Volt". Volt Estonia has not participated in any election.

=== Finland ===
Volt Finland (Finnish: Volt Suomi) started collecting signatures in July 2023 to be officially registered as a party and to be able to stand in elections. The application ended with Volt having garnered only 553 signatures out of the 5000 required by June 2024.

=== France ===
Volt France was founded as the ninth national branch of Volt Europa, and has nine active branches, with "city teams" in Grenoble, Lille, Lyon, Nantes, Nice, Paris, Rennes, and two cross-border branches in Ain-Geneva and Strasbourg-Kehl.

The party was unable to participate in the European Elections 2019 due to a lack of funding. In 2020, Volt France participated in municipal elections. The party ran in coalition with the Greens in Lille, where they received 24.5% in the first round, and lost in the second round with 39.4%; as a coalition with "100% citoyens" in Lyon, receiving 3.4% and 1.6% in two districts; and alone in Paris' 9th district, receiving 0.5% in the first round.

In the 2022 general election, the party contested in 17 out of 577 constituencies, including constituencies abroad. The party achieved its best result in the national constituencies in the 5th constituency of the Pyrénées-Atlantiques department with 3.25%. The best overall election result was achieved by Volt in the 7th constituency of the French abroad (Central Europe) with 4.97%.

In the 2024 European election, the party ran as part of the Europe Territoires Écologie coalition, but did not manage to win a seat.

=== Germany ===
Volt Germany (German: Volt Deutschland) became a registered political party in Germany in 2018, allowing it to compete in German elections. Volt Germany's basic programme is based upon a policies proposal, which is also fundamental for Volt Europa. The German branch's initial focus was the five "challenges" of "an intelligent state, social equality, economic renaissance, politically active citizenship" and "global balance". It also seeks to implement an overarching policy of transnational EU reform in accordance with the programmes of both Volt Germany and Volt Europa. Volt Germany's programme for the 2019 European elections was identical to that of all other European sections. It was adopted as the "Amsterdam Declaration" by all Volt sections in October 2018.

In the 2019 European Election, Volt Germany received 248,824 votes, 0.7% of the total votes in Germany. As a result, Volt Germany's leading candidate Damian Boeselager won one of Germany's 96 seats in the European Parliament.

Volt Germany has won individual seats on a number of city councils. In local elections occurring the same day as the European Elections in 2019, Volt received 1.2% of the votes for the election to the City Council in Mainz, winning 1 seat. In Bavaria's 2020 local elections, the party won one seat each in Bamberg and Munich. In Munich, Volt subsequently became part of the governing coalition with the Social Democrats. Later that year, the party won seats on the city councils of Cologne, Bonn, Aachen, Siegen, Münster, Düsseldorf, and Paderborn. Volt was particularly strong in Cologne and Bonn, where it received around 5% of the votes, resulting in four and three seats, respectively. The party also won seats in Darmstadt, Frankfurt, Wiesbaden, Fulda, and Heusenstamm in the 2021 Hessian local elections. The 6.5% vote share in Darmstadt, to win five of the 71 seats, was the party's best ever result in a German council.

In the 2024 European Election, Volt Germany received 1,023,161 votes (2.6%), translating to three seats in the European Parliament. The MEPs elected were Damian Boeselager, Nela Riehl and Kai Tegethoff.

=== Greece ===
Volt Greece (Greek: Βολτ Ελλάδας) was founded in 2018. In July 2022, the group elected its first executive secretariat and an ethics committee, which were tasked with preparing its establishment as a party. On 4 October 2022, the party was officially registered, becoming the 18th registered party of Volt Europa. In December 2022, Volt founded the new political alliance Green & Purple (ΠΡΑΣΙΝΟ & ΜΩΒ) together with the parties Ecologist Greens, Pirate Party of Greece, Greens – Solidarity, Greek Party for the Animals and the ecofeminist movement Kyklos. The party held its founding congress in Athens on 11 and 12 March 2023. However, the Green & Purple alliance was barred from participating in the May 2023 legislative election by the Supreme Court of Greece due to its late submission of relevant forms. In the June 2023 election, the alliance received 0.3% of the national vote.

=== Ireland ===
Volt Ireland was formed in the run-up to the 2019 European elections, but did not register as a political party. It launched its website in October 2021, and in December 2021 the website indicated that it was seeking to collect the required 300 signatures from Irish and EU citizens residing in Ireland to register as a political party.

=== Italy ===
Volt Italy (Italian: Volt Italia) was founded on 18 July 2018. Daniela Patti and Guido Silvestri are party leaders and Pasquale Lisena is treasurer.

The party was unable to take part in the 2019 European elections, failing to obtain the required 150,000 notarised supporter signatures. Since then, the party has taken part in a number of regional and local elections, winning mandates in Mantua and Isernia, among other cities, where Federica Vinci, then chair of Volt Italy, was elected deputy mayor.

In the Basilicata regional election in 2024, Volt's candidate, Eustachio Follia, gained 1.21%.

=== Kosovo ===
Volt Kosovo (Albanian: Volt Kosova, Serbian: Волт Косово) is not registered as a party in Kosovo, but engages as a movement on the ground and participates at the European level of Volt.

=== Luxembourg ===
Volt Luxembourg (Luxembourgish: Volt Lëtzebuerg, French: Volt Luxembourg, German: Volt Luxemburg) was founded in 2019 and received around 2% of the vote in the 2019 European Parliament elections. It did not repeat this result in the 2024 European Election, with the party gaining 1.04% of the votes, receiving no seats.

=== Malta ===
Volt Malta was officially registered as a political party in Malta in May 2021 and contested the 2022 elections for the national parliament, with two candidates covering four districts.

=== Netherlands ===
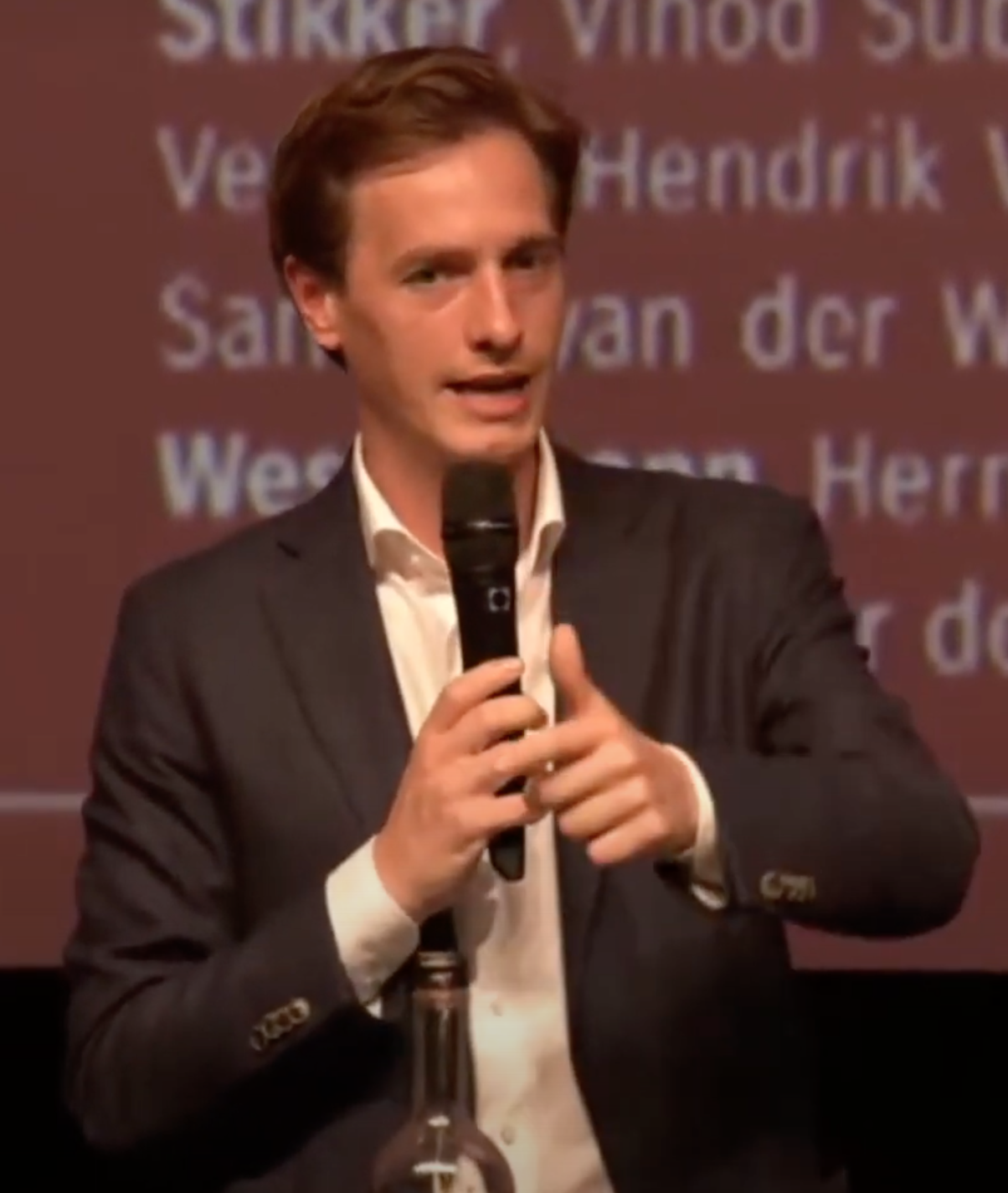
Laurens Dassen, Leader of Volt Netherlands in the House of Representatives (Netherlands)

Volt Netherlands is Volt's registered political party in the Netherlands and was founded on 23 June 2018 in Utrecht. The party received 2.42% of the vote in the 2021 general election, taking three seats in the Dutch House of Representatives. It has since then lost 1 seat due to the removal of Nilüfer Gündogan from the party due to reports of reckless and abusive behavior.

In the November 2023 general election, Volt received 1.69% of the votes, resulting in 2 seats in the Dutch House of Representatives.

For the European Parliament Elections in June 2024, Volt received 5.13% of the votes, winning 2 of the 31 Dutch seats in the European Parliament. Following the Dutch 2025 snap elections Volt has one seat in the Dutch 150 seat house of representatives (and based on the 2023 provincial elections has 2 seats in the 75 seat Dutch senate)

=== Norway ===
Volt Norway (Norwegian: Volt Norge) was established as a non-profit association (NGO) in June 2025, with its registered seat in Søgne. They advocate for full Norwegian membership in the European Union, arguing that the European Economic Area Agreement leaves Norway as a "rule-taker" rather than a "rule-maker" in European affairs. The current board of Volt Norway consists of Markus Buschmann and Fabian Rehmann.

=== Poland ===
Volt Poland (Polish: Volt Polska) has been operating in Poland as a registered association since 2023, being involved in local initiatives and partaking in international Volt structures.

=== Portugal ===
In October 2019, Volt Portugal submitted more than the 9,000 signatures needed to register as a political party. After multiple delays, the Constitutional Court approved Volt Portugal as the country's 25th party in June 2020. Volt Portugal initially planned to contest regional elections on the Azores in Autumn 2020, but was unable to do so due to a slow registration process, which did not allow enough time to recruit candidates.

In the September 2021 local elections, the party contested in Lisbon (0.42%), Porto (0.42%), Tomar (1.22%), Coimbra (coalition 43.92%) and Oeiras (coalition 7.27%), electing one single member of a Parish Assembly in Coimbra. Independent MEP Francisco Guerreiro supported the party in the local elections and announced he would join the party after his mandate expired, although in the end he did not, instead calling for further cooperation between Volt, PAN and LIVRE in order to elect 1 MEP.

In the January 2022 general election, Volt Portugal contested a national election for the first time, running in 18 of 20 districts. The party received 0.1% of the vote and did not win any seats.

In the October 2025 local elections, the party once again contested in Lisbon (0.40%), Porto (0.13%), Vila Nova de Gaia (0.60%), Odivelas (0.41%), Oeiras (in coalition 6.34%), Coimbra (in coalition 37.84%), Faro (0.89%), Tomar (0.67%), Rio Maior (4.95%), Torres Vedras (in coalition 47.16%) and Loulé (0.35%), managing to win one city council seat in Torres Vedras and one seat in the municipal assembly in Rio Maior.

In the 2026 presidential election, the party endorsed Manuela Magno for president. After she failed to gather enough signatures to register her candidacy, the party supported António José Seguro, who won the first round with 31.1% of the vote.

In the same year, MP Filipe Sousa met with Volt's MEPs, in order to discuss a partnership between Volt Portugal and the Madeira-based party Together for the People.

=== Romania ===
Volt Romania (Romanian: Volt România) is Volt's registered political party in Romania. It was registered in February 2021, the 15th registered national party of Volt Europa. The group has been active in the country since 2017, participating in initiatives against attacks on the rule of law and mobilising the diaspora to participate in the elections.

=== Slovakia ===
The chairs of Volt Slovakia (Slovak: Volt Slovensko) are Lucia Kleštincová and Rick Zedník. The party held its founding party conference on 3 February 2024. It has more female than male members.

=== Slovenia ===
On 13 November 2025, Volt Slovenia announced its intention to register as an official party. It was officially established in April 2026, with Borja Ranzinger serving as its co-chair.

=== Spain ===
Volt Europa electoral ballot for the 2021 Madrilenian regional election

Volt Spain (Spanish: Volt España) was officially registered as a party in Spain on 15 June 2018 as the third national section. The party won 32,291 votes in the 2019 European Parliament election. In May, the party contested the local elections in Madrid for the first time since the European elections, but failed to win a mandate. During the elections, a representative of the right-wing populist Vox warned against confusion with his own party, as the placement of the ballot papers next to each other was, according to him, intended to cause confusion. Volt's average age in Spain is below 35, and its chairs are Rachele Arciulo and Cristian Castrillón.

=== Sweden ===
Volt Sweden (Swedish: Volt Sverige) was founded on 2 July 2018. As of 2026, Aaron Benzinger and Laura Wiegand serve as co‑chairs, and Bastiaan van Hoorn serves as treasurer. The party has local chapters in Stockholm, Gothenburg and Lund.

Volt Sweden campaigned in the 2019 European Parliament election in Sweden as a write‑in party, relying on voters to manually write its name on blank ballot papers; it received 146 votes in this way. The party also participated in the 2022 Swedish general election, receiving 89 votes. In the 2024 European Parliament election in Sweden, Volt Sweden again stood as a write‑in option, receiving 388 votes, an increase compared with 2019 but not sufficient to win a seat.

In early November 2021, the Ljusnarsberg branch of Liberalerna announced its intention to become an independent association and run under Volt in the local elections. The branch cited disagreements with the national party's willingness to cooperate with the Sweden Democrats as the main reason for leaving. The branch’s locally elected representative, Hendrik Bijloo, subsequently joined Volt, becoming the first Volt representative in Sweden. Volt did not retain representation in the 2022 Ljusnarsberg municipal election, receiving 33 votes (1.15 %).

=== Switzerland ===
Volt Switzerland was founded on 9 October 2019. There are teams in Geneva, Zurich, Basel, Bern and Lugano. In February 2020, Volt participated in the Unity Committee for the Free Movement of Persons. It is intended to address concerns of foreigners and Swiss with a migration background to achieve greater participation in Swiss public life and was also directed against the citizens' initiative "For moderate immigration (limitation initiative)".

In the municipal elections in Zurich in February 2022, Volt stood for the first time in an election in Switzerland and fielded candidates in 2 out of 9 constituencies. In constituency 7+8 the party achieved 0.24%, in constituency 10 0.34%, which means that it did not win a mandate.

The party is part of the Swiss Europe Initiative, which calls for the Parliament and the Federal Council to start negotiations with the EU on institutional issues and cooperation.

=== Ukraine ===
Volt Ukraine (Ukrainian: Вольт Україна, romanized: Volʹt Ukrayina) was founded in July 2022. Its founder and chairman is Mykhaylo Pobigay, a war veteran and the head of the non-profit organisation Land of The Free. Volt Ukraine advocates for Ukraine to join the EU, as well as more military support and a European orientation for Ukraine. Members of Volt Ukraine also help support refugees and arrange accommodation in Europe.

=== United Kingdom ===
Volt UK was registered with the British Electoral Commission in January 2020, and campaigns for the UK to rejoin the European Union.

== European Parliament elections ==
=== 2019 European Parliament election ===
Member state	Leading candidate	Votes	% of valid votes	Seats	Note
Belgium	Christophe Calis, Marcela Válková	20,385	0.33	0	Only ran in Dutch-speaking electoral college
Bulgaria	Nastimir Ananiev	3,500	0.17	0	
Germany	Damian Boeselager, Marie-Isabelle Heiß	249,098	0.67	1	
Luxembourg	Rolf Tarrach Siegel	26,483	2.11	0	
Netherlands	Reinier van Lanschot	106,004	1.93	0	
Spain	Bruno Sánchez-Andrade Nuño	32,432	0.15	0	
Sweden	Michael Holz	146	<0.01	0	Without its own ballot papers
European Union		438,048	0.22%	1	–

In addition, Andrea Venzon, co-founder of Volt, ran in the constituency of London. As Volt had not managed to register as a political party in the United Kingdom, Venzon ran as an independent candidate, although outwardly under the Volt banner.

In France (unable to raise €800,000 in funding to meet legal requirement to print its own ballot papers), Italy (failed to collect 150,000 signatures), Austria (failed to collect 2,600 signatures), Portugal (failed to collect 7,500 signatures), and Denmark (failed to collect a number of voter declarations corresponding to at least 2% of all valid votes at the last general election), Volt had intended to participate in the European Parliament elections but was unable to meet local requirements in time.

=== 2024 European Parliament election ===
Member state	Leading candidate	Votes	% of valid votes	Seats	First spot in joint list	Notes
Belgium	Sophie in 't Veld, Suzana Carp, André Florent Staes	38,713	▲0.54	0	-	Only ran in the Dutch-speaking electoral college
Bulgaria	Nastimir Ananiev	1,504 (Note: Votes cast for the Volt candidate Nastimir Ananiev)	▼0.07	0	10th	Joint list with PP–DB
Cyprus	Andromache Sophocleous, Hulusi Kilim	10,777	▲2.92	0	-	
Czech Republic	Adam Hanka, Barbora Hrubá	1,019 (Note: Preferential votes for the 6 candidates Volt ran in the Czech Republic)	0.037	0	3rd	Joint list with Senator 21
France	Rayna Stamboliyska, Sven Franck	63,482 (Note: Contains more votes than just those for Volt candidates, as Volt ran on a joint list.)	0.26	0	7th	Joint list Europe Territoires Écologie with PRG, R&PS, MdP, MDC and CSDR
Germany	Damian Boeselager, Nela Riehl	1,023,161	▲2.57	▲3	-	
Greece	Fotis Kapsalis, Nikolaos Xesfingis	4,156 (Note: Preferential votes for the three candidates Volt ran in Greece)	0.10	0	20th	Joint list with Kosmos
Italy	Marcello Saltarelli, Silvia Panini	21,249 (Note: Results in the Nord-Est electoral district.) (Note: preferential votes for the 2 candidates Volt ran in Italy)	0.09	0	12th	Joint list with DemoS and PD
Luxembourg	Aurélie Dap, Philippe Schannes	14,348	▼1.04	0	-	
Malta	Matthias Iannis Portelli	298	▲0.11	0	-	
Netherlands	Reinier van Lanschot, Anna Strolenberg	319,238	▲5.13	▲2	-	
Portugal	Duarte Costa, Rhia Lopes	9,571	▲0.24	0	-	
Slovakia	Lucia Kleštincová, Maroš Halama	1,923	▲0.13	0	-	
Spain	Clara Panella, Cristian Castrillón	22,020	▼0.12	0	-	
Sweden	Michael Holz, Carri Ginter Wikström	388	▲0.01	0	-	
European Union	Damian Boeselager, Sophie in 't Veld	1,467,815 (Note: Total votes excludes France, as France has not yet published preferential votes per candidate and Volt ran on a joint list)	▲0.81	▲5		In addition to its top European candidates, the party put forward a symbolic transnational list.

Other national parties that announced their intention to run but ultimately failed to collect enough signatures for their registration:

- Volt Austria, lead candidates: Nini Tsiklauri, Alexander Harrer
- Volt Denmark, lead candidates: Jakob Overby Kirkegaard, Kathrine Richter
- Volt Finland
- Volt Romania's joint list Coaliția Verde Progresistă with ACUM and SENS.

== National Parliament elections ==
=== Belgium ===
Election	Political party	Leader	Votes	%	Seats	+/-	Government
2019	Volt Belgium	Jordy Vanpoucke; Olivia ten Horn	1,669	0.02	0 / 150	New	Extra-parliamentary
2024	Volt Belgium	Carlo Giovanni Giudice; Johanna Dirlewanger-Lücke	7,245	0.10	0 / 150	0	Extra-parliamentary

=== Bulgaria ===
Election	Political party	Leader	Votes	%	Seats	+/–	Government
Apr 2021	Volt Bulgaria (as part of ISMV)	Nastimir Ananiev	150,940	4.65	0 / 240	New	Snap election
Jul 2021	Volt Bulgaria (as part of ISMV)	Nastimir Ananiev	136,885	4.95	0 / 240	0	Snap election
Nov 2021	Volt Bulgaria (as part of PP)	Nastimir Ananiev	610,273	25.46	2 / 240	▲2	Coalition
2022	Volt Bulgaria (as part of PP)	Nastimir Ananiev	506,099	19.52	2 / 240	0	Snap election
2023	Volt Bulgaria (as part of PP–DB)	Nastimir Ananiev	621,069	23.54	1 / 240	▼1	Coalition
Jun 2024	Volt Bulgaria (as part of PP–DB)	Nastimir Ananiev	307,849	13.92	0 / 240	▼1	Snap election
Oct 2024	Did not contest						
2026	Volt Bulgaria (as part of Siyanie)	Nastimir Ananiev	93,559	2.84	0 / 240	0	Extra-parliamentary

=== Cyprus ===
Election	Political party	Leaders	Votes	%	Seats	+/–	Government
2026	Volt Cyprus	Andromachi Sophocleous; Panos Loizou Parras	11,487	3.09	0 / 56	New	Extra-parliamentary

=== Germany ===
Election	Political party	Leaders	Constituency		Party list		Seats	+/–	Government
Election	Political party	Leaders	Votes	%	Votes	%	Seats	+/–	Government
2021	Volt Germany	Rebekka Müller; Hans-Günter Brünker	77,594	0.17	164,300	0.35	0 / 735	New	Extra-parliamentary
2025	Volt Germany	Maral Koohestanian	391,577	0.79	355,146	0.72	0 / 630	0	Extra-parliamentary

=== Greece ===
Election	Political party	Leaders	Votes	%	Seats	+/–	Government
Jun 2023	Volt Greece (As part of P&M)	Nikolas Fournarakis; Theodora Famprikezi	15,911	0.31	0 / 300	New	Extra-parliamentary

=== Luxembourg ===
Election	Political party	Leaders	Votes	%	Seats	+/–	Government
2023	Volt Luxembourg	Aurélie Dap; Michel Conter	7,001	0.19	0 / 60	New	Extra-parliamentary

=== Malta ===
Election	Political party	Leaders	Votes	%	Seats	+/–	Government
2022	Volt Malta	Alexia DeBono; Arnas Lasys	382	0.13	0 / 67	New	Extra-parliamentary

=== Netherlands ===
Election	Political party	Lead candidate	Votes	%	Seats	+/–	Government
2021	Volt Netherlands	Laurens Dassen	252,480	2.42	3 / 150	New	Opposition
2023	Volt Netherlands	Laurens Dassen	178,802	1.71	2 / 150	▼1	Opposition
2025	Volt Netherlands	Laurens Dassen	116,468	1.10	1 / 150	▼1	Opposition

=== Portugal ===
Election	Political party	Leaders	Votes	%	Seats	+/–	Government
2022	Volt Portugal	Tiago Matos Gomes	6,240	0.11	0 / 230	New	Extra-parliamentary
2024	Volt Portugal	Inês Bravo Figueiredo	11,854	0.18	0 / 230	0	Extra-parliamentary
2025	Volt Portugal	Inês Bravo Figueiredo	12,150	0.19	0 / 230	0	Extra-parliamentary

=== Sweden ===
Election	Political party	Lead candidate	Votes	%	Seats	+/–	Government
2022	Volt Sweden	Alexander Löf	89	0.00	0 / 349	New	Extra-parliamentary
2026	Volt Sweden	Niclas Hansemark; Nurten Özkoray	228	0.00	0 / 349	0	Extra-parliamentary

=== United Kingdom ===
Election	Political party	Leader	Votes	%	Seats	+/–	Government
2024	Volt UK	Leander Ots	267	0.00	0 / 650	New	Extra-parliamentary

== Awards ==
Year	Award	Section	Issuer
2018	EuroNederlander of 2018	Volt Nederland	The European Movement Netherlands (EBN)
2019	Political Representative of the Year (2nd Place)	Volt Europa	The Good Lobby

== International cooperation ==
From 14 to 19 July 2021, Volt Europa delegates travelled to Yerevan, Armenia, to meet with representatives of the European Party of Armenia.

In November 2021, the Cypriot movement New Wave – The Other Cyprus and Volt signed a memorandum of understanding for a merger.
