= Sophie in 't Veld =

Dutch politician (born 1963)

Sophie in 't Veld MEP
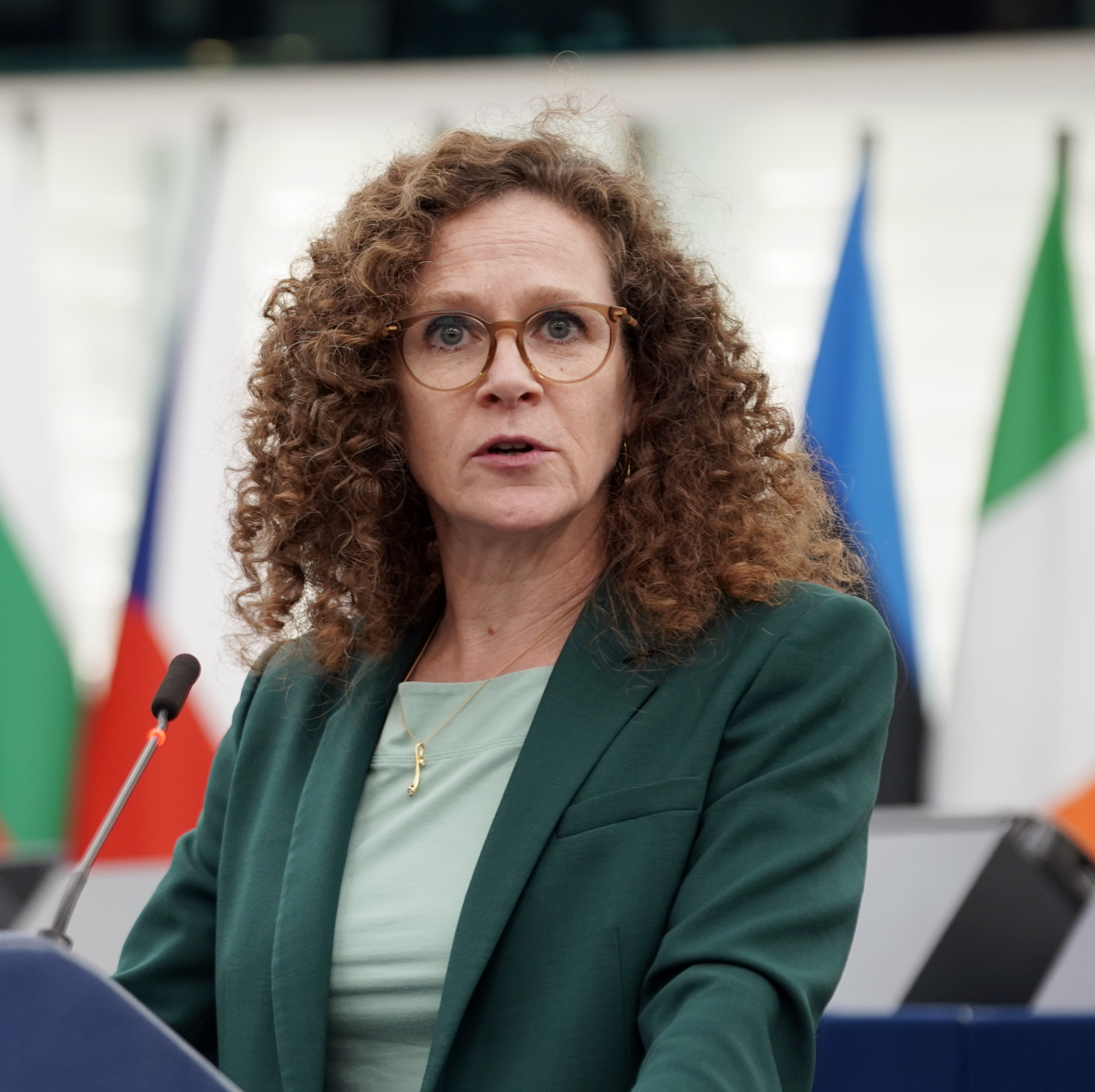
- In 't Veld in 2022

Member of the European Parliament for the Netherlands
- In office 20 July 2004 – 15 July 2024
- Preceded by: Lousewies van der Laan

Personal details
- Born: Sophia Helena in 't Veld; 13 September 1963 (age 63) Vollenhove, Netherlands
- Party: Volt (2023–present)
- Other political affiliations: Democrats 66 (1993–2023)
- Education: Leiden University
- Website: Official website
- Sophie in 't Veld introducing herself recorded April 2015

Sophia Helena "Sophie" in 't Veld (born 13 September 1963) is a Dutch politician (Volt, previously D66). She was elected as a Member of the European Parliament in 2004, and reelected in 2009, 2014 and 2019. She was D66's top candidate for the three elections and was its leader in the European Parliament since her first election.

== Early life and education ==
Sophia Helena in 't Veld was born on 13 September 1963 in Vollenhove, Netherlands.

From 1982 to 1991, she studied history at Leiden University. After completing a master's degree in medieval studies, she worked as a freelance translator in French, English and Italian, then as a trainee in the economic affairs department in the Dutch city of Gouda.

== Political career ==
Johanna Boogerd-Quaak, then a D66 MEP, hired In ’t Veld as an assistant in 1994. From 1996 to 2004, she was the secretary general of the ELDR group in the Committee of the Regions.

=== Member of the European Parliament, 2004–2024 ===
In ’t Veld was a Member of the European Parliament from the 2004 European elections, for Democrats 66 as part of the Alliance of Liberals and Democrats for Europe parliamentary group. Her election in 2004 made her the sole D66 MEP until 2009.

Between 2004 and 2009, In ’t Veld served on the Committee on Economic and Monetary Affairs. From 2009 to 2014, she was a member of the Committee on Women's Rights and Gender Equality. Since 2009, she has been a member of the Committee on Civil Liberties, Justice and Home Affairs; between 2009 and 2014, she served as the committee’s deputy chairwoman. Within the Committee, she has been chairing the Rule of Law Monitoring Group (ROLMG) since 2018.

In addition to her committee assignments, In ’t Veld founded and currently chairs the European Parliament Platform for Secularism in Politics. She is also Chair of the European Parliament Working Group on Reproductive Health, HIV/AIDS and Development since 2009 and Vice-President of the European Parliament Intergroup on LGBT Rights.

In 2017, In ‘t Veld and Guy Verhofstadt unsuccessfully tried to recruit the Five Star Movement (M5S), an Italian populist party, into ALDE. When Martin Selmayr was appointed to be Secretary-General of the European Commission in March 2018, In 't Veld led the protests in the European Parliament stating that the nomination "destroys all the credibility of the European Union".

Following the 2019 elections, In ‘t Veld ran against Dacian Cioloș and Fredrick Federley to lead the Renew Europe group but eventually lost to Cioloș. Following Cioloş's resignation in 2021, she announced her candidacy to succeed him. Shortly after, she withdrew her candidacy, which left Stéphane Séjourné the only candidate for the position.

On 16 June 2023, she announced having switched party membership from D66 to Volt. In 't Veld intended to seek re-election in the June 2024 European Parliament election as the lead candidate of Volt Netherlands, but she had not been a member of the party long enough to be eligible. She instead decided to run in Belgium's Dutch-speaking electoral college and was elected as the lead candidate of Volt Belgium in October 2023. On 7 April 2024, she was elected as the European lead candidate for Volt Europa together with Damian Boeselager. She failed to win re-election in June 2024, as Volt Belgium's vote share of 0.9% was insufficient to secure any European Parliament seats. Her term ended on 15 July 2024.

== Political positions ==
=== Social policy ===
In ‘t Veld is an ardent opponent of the death penalty. In 2009, In ‘t Veld and her fellow MEP Sarah Ludford publicly supported an online petition calling for abortion to be made legal across all EU member states. In ‘t Veld also sought the President of the European Commission to condemn Pope Benedict XVI's "statements about LGBT people", stating that "[i]n a democratic society that freedom [of expression] is limited by a ban on incitement to hatred or violence" and "religious leaders have a special responsibility as their words carry more weight in the public debate".

Following the 2014 elections, In 't Veld joined fellow MEPs Othmar Karas, Sven Giegold, Sylvie Goulard and Alessia Mosca in an open letter aimed at exerting pressure on the President of the European Commission and national government leaders during the nominations process to improve the gender balance in the composition of the European Commission.

=== Privacy ===
In 2008, In 't Veld filed a lawsuit against the United States Department of Homeland Security, demanding to see what information it had collected on her from her PNR data; this move led to her being blacklisted. A Washington, D.C. judge ruled in 2009 that the Federal government of the United States does not need to explain to In 't Veld why she must undergo additional security checks each time she visits the United States.

In July 2009, In ‘t Veld took to court again after unsuccessfully seeking access to documents about the legal basis of the EU’s agreement with the United States about how information from the international bank transfer system SWIFT concerning EU citizens would be passed from the EU to the United States. The EU’s General Court ruled in December 2009 that In ‘t Veld should be given access to parts of the documents, but the Council of Ministers heavily censored the files. In 2014, the European Court of Justice ruled that In ‘t Veld should be given access to documents prepared by the legal service of the Council. Freshfields Bruckhaus Deringer represented in 't Veld in her case.

=== Democracy ===
She lauded the measures in defense of democracy the European Union took in regards to Elon Musk's takeover of Twitter. She is the rapporteur for the EU Committee of Inquiry to investigate the use of Pegasus and equivalent surveillance spyware (PEGA) which she deemed a threat to democracy.

=== Immigration ===
Speaking in the European Parliament on 29 April 2015, In 't Veld criticised Nigel Farage's warning that Islamic extremists were likely to enter Europe among the influx of migrants and refugees from North Africa and the Middle East. She suggested that scenario would be as unlikely as an invasion by Martians. It was later claimed by the Hungarian counter terror chief that terrorists had illegally entered the EU through that method.

In September 2019, European Commission President-elect Ursula von der Leyen created the new position of “Vice President for Protecting our European Way of Life”, who will be responsible for upholding the rule-of-law, internal security and migration. In 't Veld said in a statement: "The implication that Europeans need to be protected from external cultures is grotesque and this narrative should be rejected."

== Recognition ==
In 't Veld is an Honorary Associate of the UK National Secular Society, which awarded her the Secularist of the Year prize in 2011.

== Controversy ==
In 2019, Dutch opinion magazine HP/De Tijd revealed that In 't Veld received reimbursements for years for untaken hotel stays in Brussels, the city where she resided. The total amount of unjustified reimbursements was at least tens of thousands of euros. Although In 't Veld claimed that she used these reimbursements for hotel stays in the Netherlands, it was revealed that she paid her hotel stays in the Netherlands with a different reimbursement worth more than 4,500 euros per month.

== Electoral history ==
Electoral history of Sophie in 't Veld
Year	Body	Party	Pos.	Votes	Result		Ref.
Year	Body	Party	Pos.	Votes	Party seats	Individual	Ref.
2024	European Parliament	Volt Belgium	1	7,635	0	Lost	
