= Andrea Venzon =

Italian politician (born 1992)

Andrea Venzon (Milan, 8 January 1992) is an Italian politician.

In 2017, following the exit of the United Kingdom from the European Union, he founded Volt Europa together with Colombe Cahen-Salvador of France and the German Damian Boeselager. Following the 2019 European elections, however, Venzon and Cahen-Salvador left the movement to dedicate themselves to another type of activism. In 2020, the two founded Atlas, a "global movement".

== Biography ==
Andrea Venzon was born in Milan to a family of Venetian origin; his father worked in a bank while his mother was an entrepreneur. He graduated from Bocconi University, with a specialization at the London Business School, and he worked for two years as a consultant at McKinsey. He then decided to take a master's degree in public administration at Columbia University in New York.

== Founding Volt ==
In 2017, in response to Brexit, he founded, together with French and German counterparts, a pan-European, federal and progressive political movement aimed at countering individual nationalisms in the rest of the EU, characterizing the movement by the color purple, in reference to the Women's March on Washington in 2017.

The idea of Venzon and the other two founders was immediately to establish a European political party, attentive to the global political issues of the European Union so as to start a political debate common to the various member states.

In the 2019 European elections, Volt Europa presented candidates in seven member states via its national political parties, with the aim of being able to form an independent MEP group. The electoral outcome, however, led only to the German election of Boeselager, who opted to sit with the Greens/EFA group. Following these events, both Venzon and Cahen-Salvador left Volt to devote themselves to other forms of political activism.

== Founding Atlas ==
Thus in October 2019, Venzon announced Atlas (formerly NOW!), a global movement aimed at bringing together citizens from all over the world to counter the great challenges of our time, identified by the movement as issues such as nationalism, climate change and the lack of gender equality. Atlas was officially launched on January 1, 2020.

In 2019, Venzon was placed by Forbes Italia among the 100 people under the age of 30 who could have the most influence in the near future.

== See also ==
- Volt Europa
