= Nela Riehl =

German politician

Nela Riehl MEP
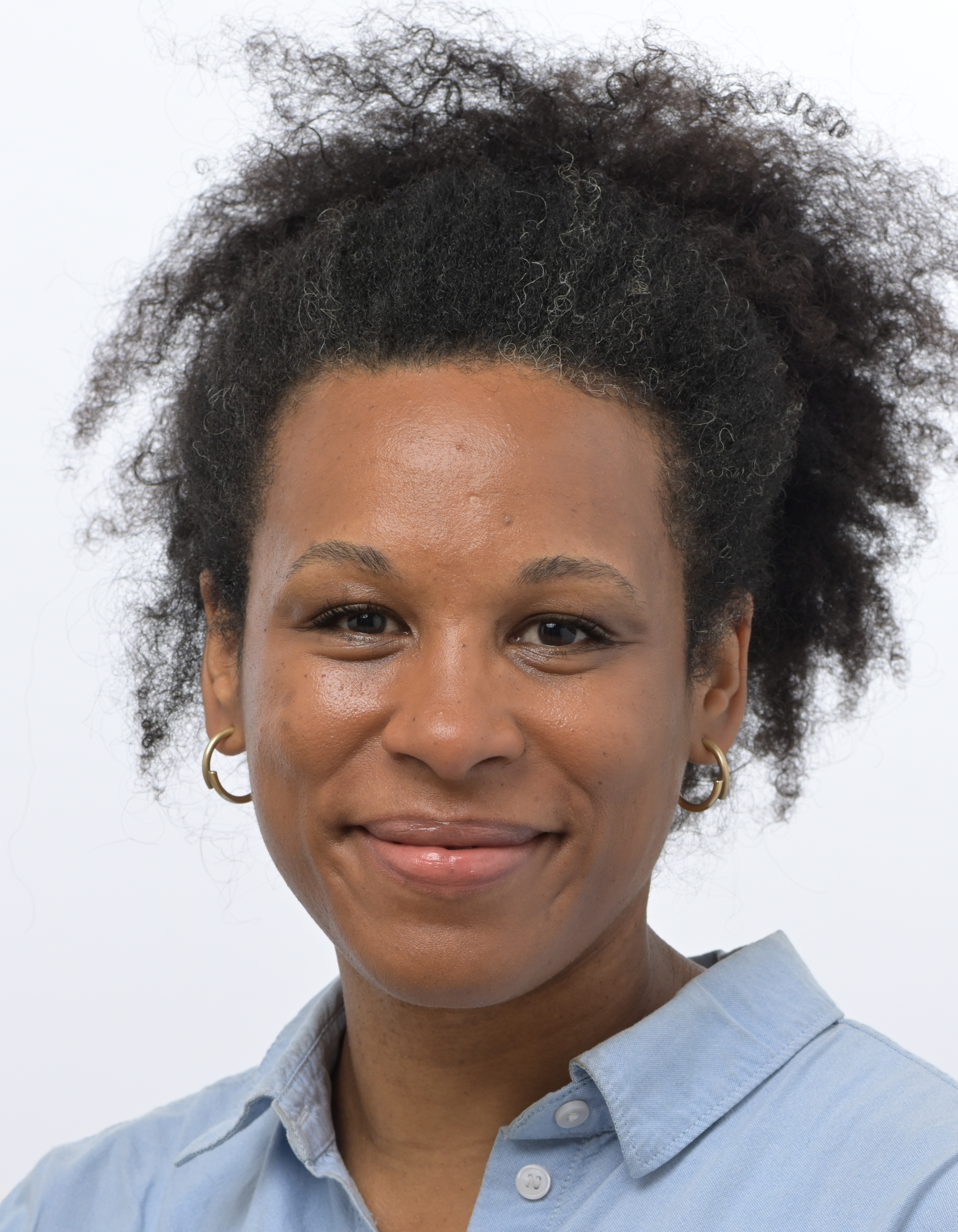
- Official portrait, 2024

Member of the European Parliament
- Incumbent
- Assumed office 16 July 2024
- Constituency: Germany

Personal details
- Born: 11 September 1985 (age 40) Hamburg, Germany
- Party: Volt Germany
- Other political affiliations: Greens-European Free Alliance

Nela Riehl (born 11 September 1985) is a German politician and teacher who is a Member of the European Parliament for Volt Europa, elected in the 2024 European parliament election.

== Life ==
Riehl resides in Hamburg and is of Ghanaian descent. She was the only black candidate in Germany during the 2024 European elections.

Until a week before the election she was still working at a secondary school in Hamburg. Her top issues have been promoting diversity and aiming for net-zero emissions.

=== European Parliament ===
Upon entering the European Parliament, Riehl was elected Chair of the European Parliament Committee on Culture and Education.

==== Sigma Boy Comments ====
On December 17, 2024, she accused the song "Sigma Boy" by Betsy and Maria Yankovskaya (a musical child duo) of communicating "patriarchal and pro-Russian worldviews".

In 2025 Riehl was a joint winner of the MEP Award for Best Newcomer.
