= Opinion polling for the 2017 Dutch general election =

In the run up to the 2017 general elections in the Netherlands, various organisations carry out opinion polling to gauge voting intention in Netherlands. Results of such polls are displayed in this article.

The date range for these opinion polls are from the previous general election, held on 12 September 2012, to the present day.

== Projections ==
=== Graphical summary ===
The seat projections in the graphs below are continuous from September 2012 (the last general election) up to the current date. Each colored line specifies a political party; numbers on the vertical axis represent numbers of seats. These seat estimates are derived from estimates by Peilingwijzer ("polling indicator") by Tom Louwerse, a professor of political science at Leiden University; they are not strictly polling averages, but the results of a model calculating a "trajectory" for each party based on changes in support over time in between polls conducted by I&O Research, Ipsos, TNS NIPO, LISS panel, Peil, and De Stemming, and adjusting for the house effects of each individual pollster.

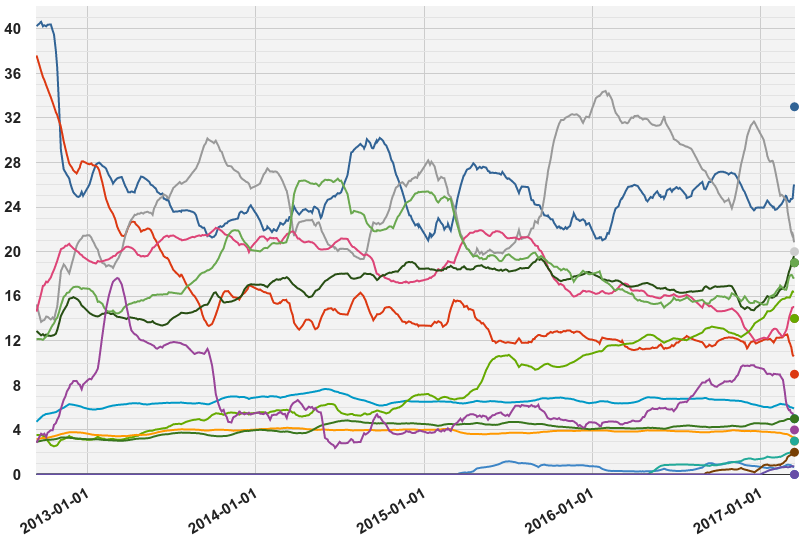

VVD
PvdA
PVV
SP
CDA
D66
CU
GL
SGP
PvdD
50+
VNL
Denk
FVD
PPNL

=== Seats ===
Poll results are listed in the tables below in reverse chronological order, showing the most recent first. The highest figure in each survey is displayed in bold, and the background shaded in the leading party's colour. In the instance that there is a tie, then both figures are shaded. In contrast with many countries, opinion poll results in the Netherlands are generally reported in terms of the number of seats expected to be won rather than the percentage of the party vote (total is 150). Seat totals from the LISS panel are recorded separately in a section below, as it represents the trends among a static panel and is not a standard poll.

Date	Polling firm	VVD	PvdA	PVV	SP	CDA	D66	CU	GL	SGP	PvdD	50+	Oth.	Lead
15 Mar 2017	Election result	**33**	9	20	14	19	19	5	14	3	5	4	5	13
14 Mar 2017	TNS NIPO	**27**	11	23	15	20	18	6	14	3	4	6	3	4
14 Mar 2017	Ipsos	**29**	9	20	15	23	18	5	15	4	4	5	3	6
14 Mar 2017	Peil	**27**	9	24	13	22	15	5	18	3	4	4	6	3
14 Mar 2017	I&O Research	**27**	12	16	14	19	20	6	20	3	5	4	4	7
13 Mar 2017	Peil	**27**	9	24	14	21	16	5	19	3	4	4	4	3
13 Mar 2017	I&O Research	**24**	13	20	14	17	18	5	20	3	6	4	6	4
13 Mar 2017	De Stemming	**24**	10	**24**	16	21	16	7	16	3	5	5	3	**Tied**
12 Mar 2017	Peil	**24**	9	22	15	22	17	5	20	3	4	5	4	2
10 Mar 2017	Peil	**24**	9	22	15	22	17	5	20	3	4	5	4	2
9 Mar 2017	Ipsos	**26**	11	23	13	21	17	6	14	5	4	6	3	3
9 Mar 2017	TNS NIPO	**26**	12	24	15	17	21	6	14	3	3	6	3	2
8 Mar 2017	I&O Research	**24**	14	20	14	16	20	5	17	4	6	5	5	4
7 Mar 2017	Peil	**25**	9	23	14	21	17	5	18	3	5	5	5	2
6 Mar 2017	De Stemming	**24**	12	**24**	15	20	16	7	16	3	4	5	4	**Tied**
5 Mar 2017	Peil	24	10	**25**	13	21	17	5	17	3	5	5	5	1
3 Mar 2017	Peil	24	10	**25**	13	21	17	5	17	3	5	5	5	1
2 Mar 2017	Ipsos	**28**	12	24	12	19	17	6	13	5	5	6	3	4
28 Feb 2017	I&O Research	**25**	14	22	12	15	17	8	20	4	5	4	4	3
28 Feb 2017	Peil	25	12	**28**	11	19	15	5	17	3	4	6	5	3
27 Feb 2017	TNS NIPO	27	12	**28**	13	17	19	6	13	3	4	6	2	1
27 Feb 2017	De Stemming	**22**	12	**22**	16	19	17	7	15	4	7	5	4	**Tied**
26 Feb 2017	Peil	25	12	**29**	11	18	14	5	18	3	4	6	5	4
23 Feb 2017	Ipsos	**28**	13	26	11	16	16	7	13	5	4	9	2	2
20 Feb 2017	TNS NIPO	25	11	**28**	11	18	19	6	16	3	3	9	1	3
19 Feb 2017	Peil	25	11	**29**	11	17	14	5	18	3	4	10	3	4
16 Feb 2017	Ipsos	26	11	**27**	10	18	17	6	14	5	5	9	2	1
15 Feb 2017	I&O Research	**24**	14	20	11	16	20	8	19	4	5	7	2	4
14 Feb 2017	De Stemming	23	12	**26**	13	18	16	6	15	4	6	10	1	3
14 Feb 2017	TNS NIPO	24	11	**27**	11	18	18	6	16	3	5	9	2	3
12 Feb 2017	Peil	24	11	**30**	12	17	14	5	17	3	4	10	3	6
5 Feb 2017	Peil	23	11	**32**	12	16	14	5	17	3	4	10	3	9
2 Feb 2017	Ipsos	24	11	**28**	12	19	17	5	14	4	5	10	1	4
1 Feb 2017	TNS NIPO	22	10	**35**	14	16	15	6	15	3	3	10	1	13
31 Jan 2017	I&O Research	25	12	**26**	13	14	15	7	18	4	5	9	2	1
30 Jan 2017	De Stemming	24	12	**31**	15	17	16	6	14	3	3	8	1	7
29 Jan 2017	Peil	24	10	**33**	11	16	14	5	16	3	4	10	4	9
22 Jan 2017	Peil	24	10	**33**	11	16	14	5	16	3	4	10	4	9
19 Jan 2017	Ipsos	**27**	11	**27**	11	18	18	6	12	5	4	10	1	**Tied**
17 Jan 2017	TNS NIPO	29	12	**30**	13	16	15	6	14	3	3	9	0	1
16 Jan 2017	De Stemming	23	11	**29**	15	18	15	7	13	4	5	9	1	6
16 Jan 2017	I&O Research	**26**	17	**26**	10	15	13	5	19	4	5	7	3	**Tied**
15 Jan 2017	Peil	23	10	**34**	11	16	14	5	16	3	4	10	4	11
8 Jan 2017	Peil	23	10	**35**	11	15	14	5	14	3	5	11	4	12
22 Dec 2016	Ipsos	28	10	**29**	10	18	18	5	13	4	5	9	1	1
20 Dec 2016	I&O Research	23	16	**33**	11	12	15	5	18	4	4	8	1	10
19 Dec 2016	De Stemming	24	12	**29**	12	16	17	7	12	4	6	9	2	5
19 Dec 2016	TNS NIPO	23	11	**36**	13	13	13	8	13	3	4	13	0	13
18 Dec 2016	Peil	23	10	**36**	11	14	14	5	14	3	5	11	4	13
11 Dec 2016	Peil	23	10	**36**	11	14	14	5	14	3	5	11	4	13
8 Dec 2016	Ipsos	27	11	**29**	12	18	17	6	11	4	5	8	2	2
5 Dec 2016	TNS NIPO	25	7	**35**	15	17	17	7	11	4	2	10	0	10
4 Dec 2016	Peil	24	9	**34**	11	15	14	6	14	3	5	11	4	10
29 Nov 2016	De Stemming	25	13	**29**	15	15	19	7	11	3	3	9	1	4
27 Nov 2016	Peil	25	9	**33**	11	15	15	6	14	3	4	11	4	8
24 Nov 2016	Ipsos	**28**	12	26	13	17	17	5	12	4	5	10	1	2
21 Nov 2016	I&O Research	27	17	**30**	15	12	13	6	12	4	4	9	1	3
20 Nov 2016	Peil	26	10	**30**	12	15	15	6	15	3	4	11	3	4
13 Nov 2016	Peil	26	10	**29**	13	16	15	6	15	3	4	9	4	3
10 Nov 2016	Ipsos	**30**	12	23	14	18	18	5	10	5	5	9	1	7
6 Nov 2016	Peil	**27**	10	**27**	13	17	15	6	15	3	4	9	4	**Tied**
3 Nov 2016	I&O Research	**28**	18	21	15	16	16	6	14	4	5	6	1	7
30 Oct 2016	Peil	**27**	10	**27**	13	17	15	6	15	3	4	9	4	**Tied**
27 Oct 2016	Ipsos	**30**	12	22	14	20	16	5	13	4	4	9	1	8
25 Oct 2016	De Stemming	25	12	**28**	17	19	15	8	9	4	4	8	1	3
23 Oct 2016	Peil	**27**	10	**27**	13	17	15	6	15	3	4	9	4	**Tied**
17 Oct 2016	TNS NIPO	**27**	11	23	16	16	18	8	12	3	4	11	1	4
16 Oct 2016	Peil	27	10	**28**	13	17	15	6	15	3	4	9	3	1
13 Oct 2016	Ipsos	**30**	11	23	14	18	17	6	15	4	4	7	1	7
9 Oct 2016	Peil	27	10	**28**	13	17	15	6	15	3	4	9	3	1
2 Oct 2016	Peil	27	10	**28**	13	17	15	6	15	3	4	9	3	1
29 Sep 2016	Ipsos	**29**	12	24	13	17	19	6	13	4	6	7	0	5
29 Sep 2016	De Stemming	26	10	**28**	17	20	16	7	11	4	4	7	0	2
25 Sep 2016	Peil	27	10	**28**	13	17	15	6	15	3	4	9	3	1
20 Sep 2016	TNS NIPO	25	9	**29**	18	14	18	7	13	4	3	7	3	4
18 Sep 2016	Peil	26	9	**29**	13	17	14	6	16	3	4	9	4	3
16 Sep 2016	Ipsos	**28**	11	24	16	17	19	7	12	4	4	8	0	4
13 Sep 2016	I&O Research	**28**	19	27	14	13	13	5	14	3	3	9	2	1
11 Sep 2016	Peil	26	9	**29**	13	17	14	6	16	3	4	9	4	3
6 Sep 2016	De Stemming	24	10	**27**	17	20	15	9	10	3	4	9	2	3
4 Sep 2016	Peil	24	9	**31**	14	17	14	6	16	3	4	8	4	7
1 Sep 2016	Ipsos	**25**	12	24	18	19	18	6	11	4	5	8	0	1
28 Aug 2016	Peil	25	9	**33**	13	17	14	6	16	3	4	8	2	8
7 Aug 2016	Peil	24	9	**35**	15	17	13	6	16	3	4	6	2	11
5 Aug 2016	Ipsos	25	13	**27**	15	19	18	5	11	4	6	7	0	2
26 Jul 2016	De Stemming	21	12	**32**	19	18	18	7	8	4	5	6	0	11
24 Jul 2016	Peil	24	9	**35**	15	17	13	6	16	3	4	6	2	11
10 Jul 2016	Peil	24	9	**35**	15	17	13	6	16	3	4	6	2	11
7 Jul 2016	Ipsos	27	12	**28**	14	19	19	5	10	4	5	7	0	1
3 Jul 2016	Peil	24	9	**36**	15	17	13	6	16	3	4	5	2	12
28 Jun 2016	De Stemming	23	10	**30**	19	19	18	7	10	3	5	5	1	7
26 Jun 2016	Peil	24	8	**37**	15	17	13	6	16	3	4	5	2	13
23 Jun 2016	Ipsos	26	14	**28**	14	20	18	5	11	4	4	6	0	2
19 Jun 2016	Peil	24	8	**37**	15	17	13	6	16	3	4	5	2	13
12 Jun 2016	Peil	24	8	**37**	15	17	13	6	16	3	4	5	2	13
9 Jun 2016	Ipsos	**26**	13	**26**	15	22	19	6	10	4	3	6	0	**Tied**
7 Jun 2016	I&O Research	27	16	**31**	17	16	12	6	12	4	3	6	0	4
5 Jun 2016	Peil	24	8	**37**	15	17	13	6	16	3	4	5	2	13
2 Jun 2016	TNS NIPO	22	12	**36**	18	15	18	7	9	3	6	3	1	14
31 May 2016	De Stemming	23	11	**33**	17	18	17	7	10	4	4	6	0	10
29 May 2016	Peil	24	8	**37**	15	17	13	6	16	3	4	5	2	13
27 May 2016	Ipsos	26	14	**28**	13	20	18	7	10	4	4	6	0	2
22 May 2016	Peil	24	8	**37**	15	17	13	6	16	3	4	5	2	13
15 May 2016	Peil	23	8	**37**	15	18	13	6	17	3	4	5	1	14
12 May 2016	Ipsos	25	13	**28**	14	20	18	6	11	4	5	6	0	3
8 May 2016	Peil	23	8	**37**	15	18	13	6	17	3	4	5	1	14
3 May 2016	De Stemming	21	10	**35**	17	19	16	8	10	4	4	6	0	14
1 May 2016	Peil	23	8	**37**	15	18	13	6	17	3	4	5	1	14
28 Apr 2016	Ipsos	25	12	**28**	15	21	19	6	11	4	4	5	0	3
24 Apr 2016	Peil	23	8	**37**	15	18	13	6	17	3	4	5	1	14
17 Apr 2016	Peil	23	8	**38**	16	18	13	6	16	3	4	4	1	15
14 Apr 2016	Ipsos	**28**	13	**28**	14	19	21	5	9	4	5	4	0	**Tied**
10 Apr 2016	Peil	24	8	**39**	16	18	13	5	16	3	4	4	0	15
6 Apr 2016	**2016 Dutch Ukraine–European Union Association Agreement referendum**													
3 Apr 2016	Peil	24	8	**39**	16	18	13	5	16	3	4	4	0	15
1 Apr 2016	TNS NIPO	25	10	**35**	16	15	18	8	10	4	4	5	0	10
31 Mar 2016	Ipsos	**29**	12	27	14	19	21	6	8	4	5	5	0	2
29 Mar 2016	De Stemming	24	10	**35**	18	18	18	7	9	3	3	5	0	11
27 Mar 2016	Peil	24	8	**39**	16	18	13	5	16	3	4	4	0	15
20 Mar 2016	Peil	24	8	**37**	17	18	14	5	16	3	4	4	0	13
18 Mar 2016	Ipsos	**29**	13	28	16	17	20	6	9	4	4	4	0	1
13 Mar 2016	Peil	23	8	**38**	17	18	14	5	16	3	4	4	0	15
7 Mar 2016	I&O Research	**27**	19	25	16	16	16	6	14	3	4	4	0	2
6 Mar 2016	Peil	23	8	**38**	17	18	14	5	16	3	4	4	0	15
3 Mar 2016	Ipsos	**29**	12	28	16	20	19	6	8	4	4	4	0	1
28 Feb 2016	Peil	21	9	**39**	16	19	15	5	15	3	4	4	0	18
26 Feb 2016	TNS NIPO	25	11	**32**	19	16	17	7	11	4	4	4	0	7
23 Feb 2016	De Stemming	23	11	**34**	18	20	16	7	9	3	4	5	0	11
21 Feb 2016	Peil	21	9	**40**	15	18	15	5	16	3	4	4	0	19
18 Feb 2016	Ipsos	27	13	**30**	16	19	18	6	9	4	4	4	0	3
14 Feb 2016	Peil	20	9	**41**	15	18	15	5	16	3	4	4	0	21
8 Feb 2016	I&O Research	**26**	17	**26**	16	15	16	6	14	4	5	5	0	**Tied**
7 Feb 2016	Peil	18	9	**42**	15	19	15	5	16	3	4	4	0	23
4 Feb 2016	Ipsos	25	12	**32**	14	20	19	7	9	4	4	4	0	7
31 Jan 2016	Peil	18	9	**42**	15	19	15	5	16	3	4	4	0	23
29 Jan 2016	I&O Research	26	15	**27**	16	17	18	6	14	4	3	4	0	1
26 Jan 2016	De Stemming	19	12	**36**	20	18	17	8	7	4	4	5	0	16
24 Jan 2016	Peil	18	9	**42**	15	19	15	5	16	3	4	4	0	23
21 Jan 2016	Ipsos	26	13	**32**	15	19	21	6	7	4	4	3	0	6
17 Jan 2016	Peil	18	9	**41**	15	19	16	5	15	3	4	4	1	22
10 Jan 2016	Peil	18	9	**41**	15	19	16	5	15	3	4	4	1	22
29 Dec 2015	De Stemming	22	11	**33**	19	21	18	6	8	4	3	5	0	11
20 Dec 2015	Peil	19	9	**39**	15	20	16	5	15	3	4	4	1	19
17 Dec 2015	Ipsos	27	13	**30**	16	19	21	5	8	4	4	3	0	3
15 Dec 2015	TNS NIPO	23	10	**33**	20	14	22	9	10	3	3	3	0	10
13 Dec 2015	Peil	20	10	**39**	15	19	16	5	14	3	4	4	1	19
6 Dec 2015	Peil	20	10	**39**	15	19	16	5	14	3	4	4	1	19
3 Dec 2015	Ipsos	26	13	**30**	15	20	20	6	9	4	4	3	0	4
2 Dec 2015	I&O Research	**27**	17	24	17	17	17	6	13	4	4	4	0	3
29 Nov 2015	Peil	20	10	**39**	15	19	16	5	14	3	4	4	1	19
24 Nov 2015	De Stemming	25	11	**35**	17	20	15	8	7	3	4	5	0	10
22 Nov 2015	Peil	20	10	**38**	15	19	16	6	14	3	4	4	1	18
19 Nov 2015	Ipsos	28	13	**31**	14	19	19	6	8	4	4	4	0	3
15 Nov 2015	Peil	19	10	**38**	16	18	17	6	14	3	4	4	1	19
8 Nov 2015	Peil	19	10	**38**	16	18	17	6	14	3	4	4	1	19
5 Nov 2015	Ipsos	27	13	**31**	13	19	20	5	8	4	5	5	0	4
1 Nov 2015	Peil	19	10	**37**	17	18	17	6	14	3	4	4	1	18
27 Oct 2015	De Stemming	21	11	**36**	19	17	17	8	7	4	5	5	0	15
25 Oct 2015	Peil	19	10	**37**	17	19	17	6	13	3	4	4	1	18
22 Oct 2015	Ipsos	28	13	**31**	13	18	21	6	8	4	3	5	0	3
18 Oct 2015	Peil	19	10	**37**	17	19	17	6	13	3	4	4	1	18
15 Oct 2015	TNS NIPO	21	11	**38**	17	15	18	8	9	4	6	3	0	17
11 Oct 2015	Peil	20	10	**35**	17	19	17	6	13	3	5	4	1	15
8 Oct 2015	Ipsos	28	13	**29**	15	17	22	6	7	5	4	4	0	1
4 Oct 2015	Peil	20	10	**33**	18	20	17	6	13	3	5	4	1	13
29 Sep 2015	De Stemming	23	11	**34**	18	19	19	6	9	3	3	5	0	11
27 Sep 2015	Peil	20	10	**30**	19	21	17	6	14	3	5	4	1	9
24 Sep 2015	Ipsos	**27**	12	25	17	19	23	6	8	4	4	5	0	2
20 Sep 2015	Peil	20	9	**29**	19	21	17	6	14	3	5	5	2	8
13 Sep 2015	Peil	21	9	**26**	20	22	18	6	13	3	5	5	2	4
10 Sep 2015	Ipsos	**29**	14	22	17	18	23	6	8	4	5	4	0	6
8 Sep 2015	I&O Research	**29**	18	20	18	18	15	5	11	3	4	9	0	9
6 Sep 2015	Peil	21	9	**24**	22	23	18	6	12	3	5	5	2	1
1 Sep 2015	De Stemming	24	12	**27**	21	19	21	7	6	4	3	6	0	3
30 Aug 2015	Peil	21	9	**24**	22	23	18	6	12	3	5	5	2	1
27 Aug 2015	Ipsos	**30**	14	20	18	20	22	6	8	4	4	4	0	6
23 Aug 2015	Peil	21	9	**24**	22	23	18	6	12	3	5	5	2	1
18 Aug 2015	TNS NIPO	**28**	13	21	23	17	23	7	7	3	5	3	0	5
16 Aug 2015	Peil	**24**	9	22	22	22	17	6	13	3	5	5	2	2
31 July 2015	Ipsos	**29**	13	21	19	20	23	5	8	4	5	3	0	6
28 July 2015	De Stemming	23	12	**28**	22	19	18	7	5	4	5	7	0	5
19 July 2015	Peil	**24**	9	21	22	22	17	6	14	3	5	5	2	2
8 July 2015	I&O Research	**28**	16	17	21	16	20	5	13	3	5	6	0	7
5 July 2015	Peil	**26**	9	20	23	22	17	6	13	3	5	4	2	3
2 July 2015	Ipsos	**28**	13	22	19	20	22	6	8	4	4	4	0	6
30 June 2015	De Stemming	**24**	11	**24**	21	21	21	6	9	3	4	5	1	**Tied**
28 June 2015	Peil	**26**	9	20	23	22	17	6	13	3	5	4	2	3
25 June 2015	TNS NIPO	**27**	13	21	21	17	21	7	8	4	5	5	1	6
21 June 2015	Peil	**26**	9	20	23	21	17	6	14	3	5	4	2	3
18 June 2015	Ipsos	**27**	13	21	20	22	20	7	7	4	5	4	0	5
14 June 2015	Peil	**25**	10	21	23	22	17	6	14	3	4	4	1	2
7 June 2015	Peil	**25**	9	21	23	22	18	6	14	3	4	4	1	2
4 June 2015	Ipsos	**29**	14	20	19	21	22	6	7	4	5	3	0	7
31 May 2015	Peil	**25**	9	21	23	22	18	6	14	3	4	4	1	2
26 May 2015	**2015 Senate election**													
26 May 2015	De Stemming	**25**	11	23	21	19	20	8	9	4	5	5	0	2
24 May 2015	Peil	**26**	11	21	22	22	17	6	13	3	4	4	1	4
21 May 2015	Ipsos	**29**	14	21	19	20	24	5	8	3	5	2	0	5
17 May 2015	Peil	**26**	11	21	22	22	17	6	13	3	4	4	1	4
10 May 2015	Peil	**26**	12	20	23	23	17	6	10	3	5	4	1	3
7 May 2015	Ipsos	**28**	13	23	21	20	23	5	5	4	5	3	0	5
3 May 2015	Peil	**26**	12	20	23	23	17	6	10	3	5	4	1	3
28 Apr 2015	De Stemming	**25**	12	**25**	22	19	20	8	4	3	5	5	2	**Tied**
26 Apr 2015	Peil	**26**	12	20	23	23	17	6	10	3	5	4	1	3
23 Apr 2015	Ipsos	**30**	13	20	21	19	22	6	7	4	5	3	0	8
19 Apr 2015	Peil	**27**	14	20	22	22	17	6	10	3	5	4	0	5
12 Apr 2015	Peil	**25**	13	21	23	22	18	6	10	3	5	4	0	2
9 Apr 2015	Ipsos	**31**	14	22	20	18	24	6	5	4	3	3	0	7
5 Apr 2015	Peil	**26**	14	21	22	22	18	6	9	3	5	4	0	4
31 Mar 2015	De Stemming	**25**	12	23	24	22	21	6	4	3	5	5	0	1
29 Mar 2015	Peil	**26**	14	21	22	22	18	6	9	3	5	4	0	4
26 Mar 2015	Ipsos	**29**	16	24	18	19	24	5	5	4	4	2	0	5
22 Mar 2015	Peil	**24**	14	22	22	22	19	6	9	3	5	4	0	2
18 Mar 2015	**2015 provincial elections**													
15 Mar 2015	Peil	23	14	**24**	20	22	21	6	9	4	4	3	0	1
12 Mar 2015	Ipsos	25	15	**26**	19	18	24	6	5	4	5	3	0	1
8 Mar 2015	Peil	21	15	**26**	17	23	22	6	8	4	5	3	0	3
5 Mar 2015	Ipsos	**26**	16	25	18	17	25	5	6	4	5	3	0	1
4 Mar 2015	TNS NIPO	21	14	25	20	17	**29**	7	5	4	3	4	1	4
2 Mar 2015	I&O Research	24	18	21	19	17	**25**	6	7	4	4	5	0	1
1 Mar 2015	Peil	17	13	**28**	18	24	24	6	9	4	5	2	0	4
26 Feb 2015	Ipsos	25	16	26	18	16	**27**	5	6	4	5	2	0	1
24 Feb 2015	De Stemming	23	12	**26**	22	19	23	7	5	4	4	5	0	3
22 Feb 2015	Peil	18	11	**29**	18	24	24	6	9	4	5	2	0	5
19 Feb 2015	Ipsos	**27**	13	**27**	18	15	**27**	5	6	4	5	3	0	**Tied**
15 Feb 2015	Peil	18	11	**29**	18	24	24	6	9	4	5	2	0	5
12 Feb 2015	Ipsos	**28**	12	27	19	15	26	5	6	4	5	3	0	1
8 Feb 2015	Peil	20	12	**29**	17	23	24	6	9	4	4	2	0	5
7 Feb 2015	I&O Research	**26**	17	23	20	17	22	6	6	3	3	7	0	3
3 Feb 2015	De Stemming	24	13	**26**	22	18	22	8	4	4	4	4	1	2
1 Feb 2015	Peil	19	12	**29**	17	23	24	6	9	4	5	2	0	5
29 Jan 2015	Ipsos	**29**	13	27	19	16	25	6	5	4	4	2	0	2
25 Jan 2015	Peil	18	12	**30**	17	23	24	6	9	4	5	2	0	6
22 Jan 2015	TNS NIPO	25	11	28	15	16	**30**	7	6	3	4	4	1	2
18 Jan 2015	Peil	17	11	**31**	18	23	24	6	9	4	5	2	0	7
15 Jan 2015	Ipsos	**29**	14	25	20	17	25	5	5	4	4	2	0	4
11 Jan 2015	Peil	17	11	**31**	17	23	24	6	10	4	5	2	0	7
23 Dec 2014	De Stemming	24	13	**28**	19	17	25	7	5	3	4	5	0	3
21 Dec 2014	Peil	18	10	**30**	17	24	24	6	10	4	5	2	0	6
18 Dec 2014	Ipsos	**27**	15	25	18	16	**27**	6	6	4	4	2	0	**Tied**
14 Dec 2014	Peil	19	11	**28**	17	24	24	6	9	4	5	2	1	4
7 Dec 2014	Peil	20	11	**28**	17	24	23	6	9	4	5	2	1	4
4 Dec 2014	Ipsos	**29**	15	25	17	17	25	5	6	4	5	2	0	4
3 Dec 2014	TNS NIPO	20	12	**28**	19	18	26	8	6	4	3	5	1	2
30 Nov 2014	Peil	21	12	**28**	16	24	23	6	8	4	5	2	1	4
25 Nov 2014	De Stemming	23	11	**26**	21	20	24	8	5	3	4	5	0	2
23 Nov 2014	Peil	22	12	**27**	16	24	23	6	8	4	5	2	1	3
20 Nov 2014	Ipsos	**28**	15	27	17	15	26	6	6	4	4	2	0	1
16 Nov 2014	Peil	23	11	**28**	17	24	22	6	7	4	5	2	1	4
9 Nov 2014	Peil	24	12	**28**	17	23	21	6	7	4	5	2	1	4
6 Nov 2014	Ipsos	**30**	16	25	16	14	28	6	6	3	4	2	0	2
2 Nov 2014	Peil	24	12	**28**	17	23	21	6	7	4	5	2	1	4
28 Oct 2014	De Stemming	**28**	14	26	20	18	19	7	5	4	4	4	1	2
26 Oct 2014	Peil	26	12	**27**	17	23	20	6	7	4	5	2	1	1
23 Oct 2014	Ipsos	**29**	17	27	14	15	26	6	6	3	5	2	0	2
19 Oct 2014	Peil	**27**	13	24	18	23	21	6	6	4	5	2	1	3
12 Oct 2014	Peil	**28**	13	24	18	23	20	5	6	4	5	3	1	4
9 Oct 2014	Ipsos	**32**	17	25	15	15	24	7	5	3	4	3	0	7
5 Oct 2014	Peil	**28**	12	23	19	23	20	5	7	4	5	3	1	5
28 Sep 2014	Peil	**29**	12	23	17	23	20	5	7	4	5	4	1	6
25 Sep 2014	Ipsos	**32**	15	25	18	15	24	6	5	3	5	2	0	7
22 Sep 2014	De Stemming	**28**	14	25	19	16	23	6	5	3	4	7	0	3
21 Sep 2014	Peil	**30**	12	23	17	22	19	6	7	4	5	4	1	7
16 Sep 2014	TNS NIPO	26	11	**27**	20	17	21	7	7	3	3	8	0	1
14 Sep 2014	Peil	**27**	11	24	20	23	20	6	6	4	5	3	1	3
11 Sep 2014	Ipsos	**29**	15	23	20	16	26	5	6	4	4	2	0	3
7 Sep 2014	Peil	**28**	12	23	20	23	20	6	6	4	5	2	1	5
31 Aug 2014	Peil	**30**	13	20	21	22	20	6	6	4	5	2	1	8
28 Aug 2014	Ipsos	**29**	18	22	18	17	24	6	6	4	5	1	0	5
26 Aug 2014	De Stemming	**27**	14	21	20	20	24	8	5	3	3	5	0	3
25 Aug 2014	TNS NIPO	28	14	18	20	17	**29**	7	5	3	4	4	1	1
24 Aug 2014	Peil	**28**	15	20	20	22	21	6	6	4	5	2	1	6
17 Aug 2014	Peil	**28**	15	20	20	21	22	6	6	4	6	1	1	6
3 Aug 2014	Peil	**27**	14	20	21	21	23	6	6	4	6	1	1	4
31 Jul 2014	Ipsos	**31**	17	23	18	17	24	6	6	3	4	1	0	7
29 Jul 2014	De Stemming	**31**	14	22	22	17	19	7	4	4	4	4	2	9
20 Jul 2014	Peil	23	11	21	22	23	**25**	7	6	4	6	1	1	2
6 Jul 2014	Peil	22	12	21	22	22	**26**	7	6	4	6	1	1	4
3 Jul 2014	Ipsos	**27**	15	23	20	18	**27**	5	6	4	4	1	0	**Tied**
29 Jun 2014	Peil	23	12	20	21	22	**26**	8	6	4	6	1	1	3
24 Jun 2014	De Stemming	23	14	24	23	19	**26**	6	6	3	4	2	0	2
22 Jun 2014	Peil	23	13	20	21	22	**24**	8	8	4	5	1	1	1
19 Jun 2014	Ipsos	**29**	14	23	20	16	26	6	7	3	5	1	0	3
15 Jun 2014	Peil	22	13	21	20	22	**25**	8	8	4	5	1	1	3
8 Jun 2014	Peil	22	13	21	20	22	**25**	8	8	4	5	1	1	3
6 Jun 2014	Ipsos	**30**	15	22	19	15	28	6	6	3	4	2	0	2
25 May 2014	De Stemming	23	12	21	23	17	**25**	7	6	3	4	8	1	2
25 May 2014	Peil	20	12	22	20	21	**25**	8	8	4	5	4	1	3
22 May 2014	**2014 European Parliament election**													
19 May 2014	TNS NIPO	22	12	19	20	18	**29**	9	7	3	4	6	1	7
18 May 2014	Peil	22	10	**24**	20	21	**24**	8	7	4	5	4	1	**Tied**
15 May 2014	Ipsos	27	13	25	19	15	**29**	6	6	3	4	3	0	2
11 May 2014	Peil	22	10	24	21	21	**25**	7	6	4	4	5	1	1
8 May 2014	Ipsos	**28**	13	25	19	14	27	7	6	4	4	3	0	1
1 May 2014	Ipsos	**28**	15	24	18	15	27	7	5	4	3	4	0	1
27 Apr 2014	Peil	21	12	24	22	19	**25**	7	6	4	4	5	1	1
21 Apr 2014	De Stemming	23	13	25	23	16	**26**	8	4	3	2	6	1	1
20 Apr 2014	Peil	22	12	24	21	20	**25**	7	6	4	4	4	1	1
17 Apr 2014	Ipsos	26	14	24	18	17	**29**	6	5	4	3	4	0	3
16 Apr 2014	TNS NIPO	25	12	23	21	15	**28**	7	5	5	2	6	1	3
13 Apr 2014	Peil	21	11	24	21	21	**25**	7	6	4	4	5	1	1
3 Apr 2014	Ipsos	26	14	26	16	15	**28**	6	5	4	4	6	0	2
30 Mar 2014	Peil	21	11	23	22	21	**25**	7	6	4	4	5	1	2
25 Mar 2014	De Stemming	25	11	20	24	17	**28**	7	5	3	2	7	1	2
23 Mar 2014	Peil	21	13	22	**23**	21	**23**	7	6	4	4	5	1	**Tied**
19 Mar 2014	**2014 municipal elections**													
13 Mar 2014	Ipsos	**26**	18	25	18	17	22	5	5	4	4	6	0	1
12 Mar 2014	TNS NIPO	21	14	**28**	22	19	20	8	6	4	5	3	0	6
6 Mar 2014	Ipsos	**26**	18	**26**	19	15	23	5	5	4	3	6	0	**Tied**
2 Mar 2014	Peil	21	14	**28**	23	19	20	6	6	4	4	4	1	5
25 Feb 2014	De Stemming	24	14	**27**	21	18	22	6	5	3	2	8	0	3
23 Feb 2014	Peil	19	13	**29**	23	19	21	7	6	4	4	4	0	6
20 Feb 2014	Ipsos	27	18	**28**	17	15	21	5	6	4	4	5	0	1
16 Feb 2014	Peil	20	13	**29**	23	18	21	7	6	4	4	4	0	6
13 Feb 2014	TNS NIPO	24	15	**30**	19	16	24	6	4	3	3	6	0	6
9 Feb 2014	Peil	19	12	**29**	24	19	21	7	6	4	4	4	1	5
6 Feb 2014	Ipsos	24	19	**27**	16	16	23	6	5	4	4	6	0	3
2 Feb 2014	Peil	19	14	**29**	24	18	21	7	6	4	4	3	1	5
28 Jan 2014	De Stemming	24	16	**29**	22	16	19	7	4	3	3	7	0	5
23 Jan 2014	Ipsos	**27**	20	25	16	15	23	5	5	4	4	6	0	2
19 Jan 2014	Peil	18	13	**30**	24	18	21	7	6	4	4	4	1	4
11 Jan 2014	Peil	20	14	**28**	24	18	20	7	6	4	4	4	1	4
9 Jan 2014	Ipsos	**28**	18	25	17	15	22	5	5	4	5	6	0	3
19 Dec 2013	De Stemming	24	18	**26**	20	19	20	6	4	3	3	7	0	2
12 Dec 2013	Ipsos	**27**	19	24	17	16	23	5	5	4	4	6	0	3
6 Dec 2013	TNS NIPO	24	18	**27**	21	14	20	8	5	3	4	6	0	3
1 Dec 2013	Peil	21	13	**29**	23	16	22	7	6	4	4	4	1	6
28 Nov 2013	Ipsos	**30**	19	24	17	15	23	5	4	3	4	6	0	6
28 Nov 2013	De Stemming	23	14	**27**	22	17	22	7	4	3	3	7	1	4
24 Nov 2013	Peil	19	13	**30**	23	16	23	7	6	4	4	4	1	7
14 Nov 2013	Ipsos	**28**	18	26	16	15	24	6	4	3	4	6	0	2
31 Oct 2013	Ipsos	**26**	20	25	17	15	25	5	5	4	3	5	0	1
24 Oct 2013	De Stemming	21	16	**27**	25	15	18	9	4	3	3	9	2	2
17 Oct 2013	Ipsos	**28**	20	26	17	17	22	5	4	4	3	4	0	2
3 Oct 2013	Ipsos	25	17	**27**	17	18	20	5	5	4	3	9	0	2
19 Sep 2013	Ipsos	25	18	**29**	17	14	21	5	3	3	4	11	0	4
18 Sep 2013	De Stemming	20	12	**31**	24	15	17	7	5	3	2	14	0	7
13 Sep 2013	TNS NIPO	24	13	**33**	21	16	17	6	3	3	4	9	1	9
5 Sep 2013	Ipsos	**28**	19	**28**	16	14	20	5	4	3	3	10	0	**Tied**
2 Sep 2013	De Stemming	20	15	**26**	24	15	17	8	5	3	3	12	2	2
1 Sep 2013	Peil	20	12	**31**	24	16	18	6	5	4	4	10	0	7
25 Aug 2013	Peil	21	13	**30**	24	15	18	6	5	4	4	10	0	6
22 Aug 2013	Ipsos	**29**	20	26	16	14	19	4	5	4	4	9	0	3
18 Aug 2013	Peil	21	13	**30**	24	15	18	6	5	4	4	10	0	6
4 Aug 2013	Peil	21	14	**29**	23	15	18	6	5	4	4	11	0	6
25 Jul 2013	Ipsos	**31**	23	24	15	13	17	5	4	4	4	10	0	7
25 Jul 2013	De Stemming	21	18	24	**25**	16	14	8	3	3	3	13	2	1
27 Jun 2013	Ipsos	**33**	23	24	15	11	18	5	4	3	4	10	0	9
27 Jun 2013	De Stemming	23	19	21	**24**	15	16	7	5	3	2	14	1	1
25 Jun 2013	TNS NIPO	**28**	23	22	23	12	14	8	3	4	2	11	0	5
16 Jun 2013	Peil	21	16	**29**	24	14	17	6	4	4	4	11	0	5
13 Jun 2013	Ipsos	**34**	24	22	16	11	17	5	4	4	4	9	0	10
9 Jun 2013	Peil	22	17	**28**	23	14	17	6	4	4	4	11	0	5
2 Jun 2013	Peil	22	18	**28**	23	14	17	6	4	4	4	10	0	5
30 May 2013	Ipsos	**32**	25	22	17	12	17	5	4	3	3	10	0	7
16 May 2013	Peil	23	18	**28**	22	14	17	6	4	3	4	11	0	5
16 May 2013	Ipsos	**32**	26	22	16	13	16	4	4	3	3	11	0	6
5 May 2013	Peil	24	19	**27**	21	15	17	6	4	3	3	11	0	3
28 Apr 2013	Peil	25	18	**27**	21	15	17	6	4	3	3	11	0	2
24 Apr 2013	De Stemming	**25**	22	21	23	15	13	9	3	3	3	12	1	2
18 Apr 2013	Ipsos	**30**	25	22	15	14	16	5	3	4	4	12	0	5
17 Apr 2013	TNS NIPO	**28**	22	23	19	13	13	7	4	4	3	14	0	5
14 Apr 2013	Peil	21	21	**27**	23	15	17	6	3	3	3	11	0	4
7 Apr 2013	Peil	23	21	**26**	23	15	16	6	3	3	3	11	0	3
26 Mar 2013	De Stemming	**25**	21	21	24	14	14	7	3	2	2	16	1	1
21 Mar 2013	Ipsos	**31**	24	20	16	12	17	5	3	4	2	16	0	7
7 Mar 2013	Ipsos	**32**	24	18	17	11	15	5	3	3	3	19	0	8
25 Feb 2013	De Stemming	**24**	23	16	23	16	14	7	3	3	2	19	0	1
21 Feb 2013	Ipsos	**32**	27	17	16	11	16	5	3	3	3	17	0	5
7 Feb 2013	Ipsos	**33**	29	19	15	12	15	5	3	3	3	13	0	4
24 Jan 2013	Ipsos	**32**	**32**	20	15	13	16	5	3	3	3	8	0	**Tied**
23 Jan 2013	De Stemming	**27**	**27**	19	23	14	13	7	4	3	3	9	1	**Tied**
13 Jan 2013	Peil	**25**	**25**	24	21	15	18	5	3	3	3	8	0	**Tied**
10 Jan 2013	Ipsos	30	**34**	21	15	13	17	5	2	3	4	6	0	4
6 Jan 2013	Peil	23	**25**	**25**	21	15	18	5	3	4	3	8	0	**Tied**
23 Dec 2012	Peil	21	**26**	25	21	16	18	5	3	4	3	8	0	1
20 Dec 2012	Ipsos	29	**31**	22	17	14	17	5	2	3	3	7	0	2
19 Dec 2012	De Stemming	26	**29**	19	23	15	15	7	3	3	2	7	1	1
19 Dec 2012	TNS NIPO	24	**34**	21	17	15	15	6	4	4	3	7	0	10
16 Dec 2012	Peil	22	23	**24**	22	17	18	6	3	4	3	8	0	1
13 Dec 2012	Ipsos	28	**31**	20	17	15	18	5	3	3	3	7	0	3
9 Dec 2012	Peil	22	23	**24**	22	17	18	6	3	4	3	8	0	1
2 Dec 2012	Peil	22	**24**	22	22	18	18	6	3	4	3	8	0	2
29 Nov 2012	Ipsos	30	**31**	18	17	13	18	5	3	4	4	7	0	1
25 Nov 2012	Peil	23	**25**	21	22	17	18	6	3	4	3	8	0	2
22 Nov 2012	De Stemming	**26**	**26**	15	25	18	14	9	4	3	2	8	0	**Tied**
18 Nov 2012	Peil	24	**26**	21	22	15	18	6	3	4	4	7	0	2
15 Nov 2012	Ipsos	**32**	**32**	18	19	13	16	5	3	4	3	5	0	**Tied**
11 Nov 2012	Peil	23	**27**	23	22	16	18	5	3	3	4	6	0	4
6 Nov 2012	TNS NIPO	21	**33**	20	21	17	17	4	3	4	2	8	0	12
4 Nov 2012	De Stemming	26	**30**	18	24	15	13	8	3	3	3	6	1	4
4 Nov 2012	Peil	27	**30**	20	22	15	16	5	3	3	4	5	0	3
1 Nov 2012	Ipsos	**41**	34	16	16	11	15	5	3	3	3	3	0	7
28 Oct 2012	Peil	**38**	31	16	21	13	14	5	2	3	3	4	0	7
24 Oct 2012	De Stemming	**39**	32	13	22	12	13	6	2	3	2	5	1	9
21 Oct 2012	Peil	**40**	31	15	20	13	14	5	2	3	3	4	0	9
18 Oct 2012	Ipsos	**44**	36	15	15	11	15	4	2	3	3	2	0	8
14 Oct 2012	Peil	**40**	32	16	19	13	14	5	2	3	3	3	0	8
4 Oct 2012	Ipsos	**42**	36	14	16	13	13	5	3	2	4	2	0	6
26 Sep 2012	De Stemming	**38**	34	12	22	14	10	7	3	3	2	4	1	4
12 Sep 2012	Election results	**41**	38	15	15	13	12	5	4	3	2	2	0	3

==== LISS panel ====
Date	VVD	PvdA	PVV	SP	CDA	D66	CU	GL	SGP	PvdD	50+	Denk	VNL	FvD	Others	Lead
15 Mar 2017	26	11	21	18	17	19	6	18	1	5	6	1	0	1	0	5
14 Mar 2017	25	12	21	18	17	19	5	18	1	5	7	1	0	1	0	4
13 Mar 2017	24	11	22	19	17	18	5	18	2	5	7	1	0	1	0	2
12 Mar 2017	25	12	21	19	17	18	5	18	2	5	7	0	0	1	0	4
11 Mar 2017	25	12	22	19	16	19	5	18	2	5	7	0	0	0	0	3
10 Mar 2017	25	12	21	18	16	18	6	17	2	5	6	1	1	1	1	4
9 Mar 2017	25	13	21	17	16	18	6	17	2	5	6	1	1	1	2	4
8 Mar 2017	26	13	21	16	16	18	6	15	2	5	6	1	1	1	2	5
7 Mar 2017	25	13	21	18	16	18	6	15	2	6	6	1	1		3	4
6 Mar 2017	25	13	22	17	15	19	6	15	2	6	5	1	1		3	3
5 Mar 2017	25	13	21	17	15	18	6	15	2	6	6	1	1		3	4
4 Mar 2017	25	13	21	16	15	18	6	15	2	6	6	2	1		3	4
3 Mar 2017	25	13	21	17	15	18	6	16	2	6	6	1	1		3	4
2 Mar 2017	25	13	21	17	15	18	6	16	2	6	6	1	1		3	4
1 Mar 2017	25	13	22	17	15	18	6	16	2	6	6	1	1		3	3
28 Feb 2017	26	13	22	15	15	17	6	17	2	6	6	1	1		3	4
27 Feb 2017	26	14	22	15	15	17	6	17	2	5	7	1	1		2	4
26 Feb 2017	25	14	22	16	15	18	6	17	2	4	7	1	1		2	3
25 Feb 2017	25	14	21	16	15	18	6	17	2	5	7	1	1		2	4
24 Feb 2017	25	14	22	15	14	18	6	16	2	5	8	1	1		2	3
23 Feb 2017	24	14	23	16	14	17	6	16	2	5	8	2	1		2	1
22 Feb 2017	24	14	22	15	14	18	6	16	2	5	8	2	1		2	2
21 Feb 2017	24	14	22	15	14	18	6	17	2	4	8	1	1		2	2
20 Feb 2017	25	13	23	16	14	18	6	16	2	5	8	2	1		2	2
19 Feb 2017	25	13	23	15	14	18	6	16	2	5	8	1	1		2	2
18 Feb 2017	25	13	23	15	14	18	6	15	2	5	8	2	1		2	2
17 Feb 2017	25	14	22	16	14	18	6	16	2	5	8	2	1		2	3
16 Feb 2017	25	14	22	16	15	18	6	15	2	5	8	1	1		2	3
15 Feb 2017	25	14	22	16	15	18	6	15	2	5	8	2	1		2	3
14 Feb 2017	25	14	22	16	14	18	6	15	2	5	8	1	1		2	3
13 Feb 2017	24	14	21	16	15	18	6	16	2	5	8	1	1		2	3
12 Feb 2017	24	14	21	16	15	19	6	15	2	5	8	1	1		2	3
11 Feb 2017	24	14	22	16	15	18	7	16	2	5	8	1	1		2	2
10 Feb 2017	24	14	22	16	15	19	6	15	3	4	8	1	1		2	2
9 Feb 2017	25	14	22	16	15	18	6	15	3	4	8	1	1		2	3
8 Feb 2017	25	14	23	16	15	19	6	15	2	4	8	1	0		2	2
7 Feb 2017	25	14	23	17	14	19	6	15	2	5	8	1	1		2	2
6 Feb 2017	25	14	23	16	15	19	6	15	2	4	8	1	1		1	2
5 Feb 2017	24	15	23	17	15	19	5	15	2	4	7	1	1		1	1
4 Feb 2017	24	15	23	17	15	19	5	15	2	4	7	1	1		1	1
3 Feb 2017	24	15	23	16	15	19	6	15	2	4	8	1	1		1	1
2 Feb 2017	24	15	23	16	15	19	5	15	2	4	8	1	1		1	1
1 Feb 2017	24	15	23	16	15	19	6	15	2	5	8	1	1		1	1
31 Jan 2017	24	15	**24**	16	15	19	6	14	3	4	7	1	1		1	**Tied**
30 Jan 2017	25	15	23	16	15	19	6	14	3	5	8	1	1		1	2
29 Jan 2017	25	16	23	16	14	19	6	14	3	4	8	1	0		2	2
28 Jan 2017	24	16	23	16	15	18	5	14	3	4	8	1	1		2	1
27 Jan 2017	24	16	23	16	15	18	5	14	3	4	8	1	1		2	1
26 Jan 2017	24	16	23	16	15	19	5	14	3	5	8	1	1		2	1
25 Jan 2017	25	16	23	16	15	19	5	14	3	4	8	1	1		2	2
24 Jan 2017	25	16	23	16	15	19	5	14	3	4	8	1	1		2	2
12 Sep 2012	41	38	15	15	13	12	5	4	3	2	2	0	0	0	0	3

== See also ==
- Opinion polling for the 2021 Dutch general election
- Opinion polling for the 2023 Dutch general election
