= Opinion polling for the 2021 Dutch general election =

In the run-up to the 2021 Dutch general election, various organisations are carrying out opinion polling to gauge voting intentions in the Netherlands. Results of such polls are displayed in this list.

The date range for these opinion polls are from the previous general election, held on 15 March 2017, to the present day. The next election is scheduled for 17 March 2021. Snap elections occur fairly frequently in the Netherlands, having most recently occurred in 2012.

No sample sizes or date ranges are provided by Maurice de Hond's Peil.nl; the panel includes approximately 3,000 respondents per week. Data on sample sizes and dates for the first two Kantar Public polls was not provided. Because date ranges and sample sizes for the Ipsos Political Barometer is not archived, only the end dates are listed. The date of publication is the listed date for Peil.nl polls, while the end date is used for Ipsos, I&O Research, Kantar Public, and GfK (De Stemming/EenVandaag). Starting in January 2018, EenVandaag cooperates with Ipsos for De Peiling, and has dropped GfK as their pollster.

== Projections ==
=== Graphical summary ===
The averages in the graphs below were constructed using polls listed below conducted by the five major Dutch pollsters. The trendlines show local regressions representing seat totals (not vote percentages).

=== Seats ===
There are 150 seats in total. Parties are denoted with en dashes if no indication is given of their level in polls.

| Polling firm | Date | VVD | PVV | CDA | D66 | GL | SP | PvdA | CU | PvdD | 50+ | SGP | DENK | FvD | JA21 | Volt | BIJ1 | BBB | Others | Lead |
|---|---|---|---|---|---|---|---|---|---|---|---|---|---|---|---|---|---|---|---|---|
| Kiesraad | 17 Mar 2021 | 34 | 17 | 15 | 24 | 8 | 9 | 9 | 5 | 6 | 1 | 3 | 3 | 8 | 3 | 3 | 1 | 1 | 0 | 10 |
| Peil.nl | 16 Mar 2021 | 32 | 22 | 17 | 19 | 8 | 11 | 10 | 6 | 6 | 0 | 3 | 2 | 6 | 3 | 3 | 1 | 1 | 0 | 10 |
| I&O Research | 16 Mar 2021 | 33 | 19 | 17 | 19 | 11 | 10 | 11 | 6 | 5 | 1 | 3 | 2 | 5 | 2 | 4 | 1 | 1 | 0 | 14 |
| Ipsos | 16 Mar 2021 | 35 | 19 | 17 | 19 | 11 | 11 | 11 | 6 | 6 | 0 | 3 | 2 | 5 | 2 | 2 | 0 | 1 | 0 | 16 |
| Kantar Public | 16 Mar 2021 | 36 | 18 | 15 | 17 | 9 | 12 | 12 | 6 | 6 | 1 | 3 | 2 | 5 | 2 | 3 | 1 | 1 | 1 (Note: Splinter with 1 seat) | 18 |
| I&O Research | 15 Mar 2021 | 33 | 20 | 16 | 19 | 11 | 10 | 11 | 6 | 5 | 1 | 3 | 2 | 5 | 2 | 4 | 1 | 1 | 0 | 13 |
| Peil.nl | 14 Mar 2021 | 31 | 24 | 18 | 17 | 8 | 10 | 11 | 6 | 6 | 1 | 3 | 2 | 6 | 3 | 3 | 1 | | 0 | 7 |
| Ipsos | 9 Mar 2021 | 39 | 21 | 17 | 14 | 12 | 10 | 11 | 6 | 6 | 2 | 3 | 2 | 4 | 2 | 1 | | | 0 | 18 |
| Kantar Public | 8 Mar 2021 | 40 | 17 | 19 | 15 | 11 | 12 | 13 | 6 | 6 | 3 | 2 | 1 | 3 | 1 | 1 | | | 0 | 21 |
| I&O Research | 8 Mar 2021 | 36 | 19 | 15 | 16 | 11 | 10 | 13 | 6 | 5 | 2 | 4 | 3 | 4 | 2 | 3 | 1 | | 0 | 17 |
| Peil.nl | 7 Mar 2021 | 32 | 24 | 17 | 14 | 9 | 9 | 12 | 7 | 7 | 2 | 3 | 2 | 5 | 3 | 2 | 1 | | 1 (Note: Code Orange with 1 seat) | 8 |
| I&O Research | 2 Mar 2021 | 37 | 19 | 17 | 15 | 12 | 9 | 13 | 5 | 6 | 2 | 4 | 2 | 5 | 2 | 2 | | | 0 | 20 |
| Ipsos | 2 Mar 2021 | 38 | 21 | 18 | 14 | 13 | 10 | 12 | 5 | 6 | 1 | 3 | 3 | 4 | 1 | 1 | | | 0 | 17 |
| Peil.nl | 28 Feb 2021 | 33 | 24 | 19 | 13 | 9 | 9 | 12 | 7 | 7 | 2 | 3 | 2 | 4 | 3 | 1 | 1 | | 1 | 9 |
| Kantar Public | 25 Feb 2021 | 40 | 17 | 17 | 15 | 12 | 10 | 13 | 7 | 6 | 4 | 2 | 2 | 3 | 1 | 1 | | | 0 | 23 |
| Peil.nl | 21 Feb 2021 | 34 | 23 | 18 | 13 | 9 | 9 | 13 | 7 | 7 | 2 | 3 | 2 | 4 | 3 | 1 | 1 | | 1 | 11 |
| Ipsos | 16 Feb 2021 | 38 | 22 | 20 | 15 | 11 | 10 | 12 | 6 | 7 | 1 | 2 | 2 | 3 | 1 | | | | 0 | 16 |
| I&O Research | 15 Feb 2021 | 39 | 19 | 18 | 14 | 12 | 10 | 13 | 5 | 5 | 1 | 3 | 3 | 4 | 3 | 1 | | | 0 | 20 |
| Peil.nl | 14 Feb 2021 | 35 | 24 | 18 | 13 | 9 | 9 | 13 | 7 | 7 | 1 | 3 | 2 | 4 | 3 | 1 | | | 1 | 11 |
| Peil.nl | 7 Feb 2021 | 35 | 24 | 18 | 13 | 9 | 9 | 13 | 7 | 7 | 1 | 3 | 2 | 5 | 3 | 1 | | | 0 | 11 |
| I&O Research | 2 Feb 2021 | 43 | 19 | 19 | 12 | 11 | 11 | 13 | 7 | 5 | 1 | 3 | 2 | 3 | 1 | | | | 0 | 24 |
| Peil.nl | 31 Jan 2021 | 35 | 24 | 19 | 11 | 9 | 10 | 12 | 7 | 7 | 1 | 3 | 3 | 4 | 3 | 1 | 1 | | 0 | 11 |
| Kantar Public | 28 Jan 2021 | 42 | 17 | 18 | 14 | 13 | 11 | 12 | 5 | 5 | 3 | 3 | 3 | 3 | 1 | | | | 0 | 25 |
| Ipsos | 26 Jan 2021 | 40 | 20 | 20 | 15 | 12 | 9 | 12 | 6 | 6 | 1 | 2 | 2 | 3 | 2 | | | | 0 | 20 |
| I&O Research | 25 Jan 2021 | 42 | 19 | 17 | 14 | 13 | 11 | 12 | 7 | 4 | 1 | 3 | 1 | 4 | 2 | | | | 0 | 23 |
| Peil.nl | 24 Jan 2021 | 35 | 24 | 19 | 12 | 9 | 10 | 11 | 7 | 8 | 1 | 3 | 3 | 4 | 3 | | 1 | | 0 | 11 |
| Peil.nl | 17 Jan 2021 | 35 | 25 | 17 | 14 | 10 | 10 | 10 | 7 | 7 | 1 | 3 | 3 | 4 | 3 | | 1 | | 0 | 10 |
| | 15 Jan 2021 | Prime Minister Mark Rutte and his cabinet resign over the child welfare scandal | | | | | | | | | | | | | | | | | | |
| Kantar Public | 15 Jan 2021 | 43 | 21 | 17 | 13 | 12 | 11 | 10 | 6 | 4 | 2 | 3 | 2 | 4 | 2 | | | | 0 | 22 |
| I&O Research | 11 Jan 2021 | 43 | 20 | 18 | 13 | 13 | 10 | 11 | 7 | 4 | 1 | 3 | 1 | 4 | 2 | | | | 0 | 23 |
| Peil.nl | 10 Jan 2021 | 33 | 25 | 18 | 13 | 10 | 9 | 11 | 8 | 7 | 1 | 4 | 3 | 4 | 3 | | 1 | | 0 | 8 |
| Peil.nl | 3 Jan 2021 | 33 | 25 | 18 | 13 | 10 | 9 | 12 | 8 | 6 | 1 | 4 | 3 | 4 | 2 | | 1 | | 1 | 8 |
| Kantar Public | 23 Dec 2020 | 43 | 19 | 17 | 15 | 10 | 9 | 14 | 10 | 5 | 1 | 2 | 2 | 2 | 1 | | | | 0 | 24 |
| Ipsos | 22 Dec 2020 | 42 | 22 | 21 | 13 | 11 | 10 | 12 | 5 | 5 | 1 | 2 | 2 | 3 | 0 | | | | 0 | 20 |
| Peil.nl | 20 Dec 2020 | 34 | 26 | 19 | 12 | 10 | 9 | 13 | 7 | 6 | 1 | 4 | 3 | 4 | 1 | | | | 1 | 8 |
| | 18 Dec 2020 | 33 members of the States-Provincial, 3 MEPs and 8 members of the Senate split from Forum for Democracy, forming JA21 | | | | | | | | | | | | | | | | | | |
| I&O Research | 15 Dec 2020 | 43 | 22 | 19 | 13 | 12 | 9 | 13 | 6 | 4 | 1 | 3 | 1 | 4 | 0 | | | | 0 | 21 |
| Peil.nl | 13 Dec 2020 | 34 | 28 | 16 | 12 | 11 | 9 | 14 | 7 | 6 | 1 | 4 | 3 | 4 | | | | | 1 | 6 |
| Peil.nl | 5 Dec 2020 | 36 | 27 | 14 | 13 | 11 | 9 | 13 | 7 | 6 | 2 | 4 | 3 | 4 | | | | | 1 | 9 |
| Peil.nl | 27 Nov 2020 | 36 | 28 | 14 | 13 | 11 | 10 | 13 | 7 | 6 | 2 | 3 | 3 | 3 | | | | | 1 | 8 |
| Ipsos | 25 Nov 2020 | 39 | 20 | 18 | 15 | 12 | 10 | 14 | 6 | 5 | 1 | 3 | 1 | 6 | | | | | 0 | 19 |
| Peil.nl | 22 Nov 2020 | 36 | 24 | 13 | 13 | 12 | 10 | 13 | 7 | 6 | 1 | 3 | 3 | 8 | | | | | 1 | 12 |
| I&O Research | 19 Nov 2020 | 44 | 21 | 13 | 13 | 13 | 10 | 13 | 7 | 4 | 1 | 3 | 2 | 6 | | | | | 0 | 23 |
| Kantar Public | 16 Nov 2020 | 43 | 20 | 14 | 11 | 13 | 10 | 15 | 6 | 4 | 3 | 3 | 2 | 5 | | | | | 1 | 23 |
| Peil.nl | 15 Nov 2020 | 35 | 24 | 13 | 12 | 13 | 11 | 13 | 7 | 5 | 1 | 4 | 3 | 8 | | | | | 1 | 11 |
| Peil.nl | 8 Nov 2020 | 35 | 24 | 13 | 12 | 13 | 11 | 13 | 7 | 5 | 1 | 4 | 3 | 8 | | | | | 1 | 11 |
| Peil.nl | 1 Nov 2020 | 35 | 24 | 13 | 12 | 13 | 11 | 13 | 7 | 5 | 1 | 4 | 3 | 8 | | | | | 1 | 11 |
| Ipsos | 27 Oct 2020 | 42 | 20 | 17 | 13 | 14 | 10 | 13 | 6 | 5 | 1 | 3 | 1 | 5 | | | | | 0 | 22 |
| Peil.nl | 18 Oct 2020 | 33 | 24 | 13 | 12 | 12 | 11 | 14 | 6 | 5 | 2 | 4 | 3 | 10 | | | | | 1 | 9 |
| I&O Research | 12 Oct 2020 | 42 | 19 | 14 | 14 | 14 | 9 | 13 | 7 | 5 | 1 | 3 | 2 | 7 | | | | | 0 | 23 |
| Peil.nl | 11 Oct 2020 | 33 | 23 | 13 | 13 | 11 | 12 | 16 | 6 | 5 | 2 | 4 | 2 | 10 | | | | | 0 | 10 |
| Peil.nl | 4 Oct 2020 | 33 | 23 | 13 | 13 | 11 | 12 | 16 | 6 | 5 | 2 | 4 | 2 | 10 | | | | | 0 | 10 |
| Kantar Public | 29 Sep 2020 | 39 | 26 | 11 | 14 | 14 | 10 | 11 | 8 | 3 | 2 | 3 | 3 | 6 | | | | | 0 | 13 |
| Ipsos | 29 Sep 2020 | 40 | 20 | 17 | 13 | 12 | 10 | 13 | 6 | 6 | 2 | 3 | 1 | 7 | | | | | 0 | 20 |
| Peil.nl | 27 Sep 2020 | 33 | 23 | 13 | 13 | 11 | 12 | 16 | 6 | 5 | 2 | 4 | 2 | 10 | | | | | 0 | 10 |
| Peil.nl | 20 Sep 2020 | 33 | 23 | 13 | 13 | 11 | 12 | 16 | 6 | 5 | 2 | 4 | 2 | 10 | | | | | 0 | 10 |
| I&O Research | 8 Sep 2020 | 40 | 19 | 13 | 13 | 15 | 10 | 13 | 7 | 4 | 2 | 3 | 1 | 10 | | | | | 0 | 21 |
| Peil.nl | 6 Sep 2020 | 32 | 24 | 13 | 14 | 11 | 12 | 14 | 7 | 6 | 1 | 4 | 2 | 10 | | | | | 0 | 8 |
| Ipsos | 1 Sep 2020 | 37 | 18 | 16 | 15 | 13 | 11 | 14 | 7 | 5 | 1 | 3 | 1 | 9 | | | | | 0 | 19 |
| Peil.nl | 30 Aug 2020 | 31 | 23 | 14 | 14 | 12 | 12 | 15 | 6 | 6 | 1 | 4 | 2 | 10 | | | | | 0 | 8 |
| Peil.nl | 23 Aug 2020 | 32 | 21 | 15 | 12 | 12 | 12 | 16 | 6 | 6 | 1 | 3 | 2 | 11 | | | | | 1 (Note: GO/PvdT with 1 seat) | 11 |
| Peil.nl | 16 Aug 2020 | 35 | 18 | 16 | 13 | 12 | 11 | 16 | 7 | 5 | 1 | 3 | 1 | 11 | | | | | 1 | 17 |
| Ipsos | 28 Jul 2020 | 39 | 15 | 17 | 13 | 13 | 11 | 13 | 6 | 6 | 2 | 3 | 1 | 10 | | | | | 1 | 22 |
| Peil.nl | 26 Jul 2020 | 35 | 19 | 17 | 14 | 12 | 10 | 15 | 7 | 5 | 0 | 3 | 1 | 11 | | | | | 1 | 16 |
| Peil.nl | 19 Jul 2020 | 33 | 18 | 17 | 14 | 12 | 10 | 15 | 7 | 5 | 1 | 4 | 1 | 12 | | | | | 1 | 15 |
| Kantar Public | 26 Jun 2020 | 40 | 15 | 14 | 12 | 15 | 12 | 12 | 5 | 4 | 2 | 3 | 2 | 13 | | | | | 1 | 25 |
| I&O Research | 8 Jul 2020 | 39 | 16 | 17 | 14 | 16 | 9 | 12 | 7 | 4 | 0 | 4 | 0 | 12 | | | | | 0 | 22 |
| Peil.nl | 5 Jul 2020 | 33 | 18 | 19 | 12 | 12 | 10 | 16 | 7 | 5 | 1 | 4 | 1 | 11 | | | | | 1 | 14 |
| Ipsos | 30 Jun 2020 | 41 | 16 | 16 | 14 | 13 | 10 | 12 | 7 | 5 | 1 | 3 | 2 | 9 | | | | | 1 | 25 |
| Peil.nl | 28 Jun 2020 | 33 | 18 | 19 | 12 | 12 | 10 | 16 | 7 | 5 | 1 | 4 | 1 | 11 | | | | | 1 | 14 |
| Peil.nl | 21 Jun 2020 | 33 | 18 | 18 | 10 | 12 | 10 | 18 | 7 | 5 | 2 | 4 | 1 | 11 | | | | | 1 | 15 |
| I&O Research | 9 Jun 2020 | 45 | 15 | 14 | 11 | 15 | 10 | 13 | 7 | 4 | 1 | 4 | 0 | 11 | | | | | 0 | 30 |
| Peil.nl | 31 May 2020 | 35 | 18 | 16 | 10 | 12 | 10 | 19 | 7 | 5 | 1 | 4 | 1 | 11 | | | | | 1 | 16 |
| Ipsos | 26 May 2020 | 44 | 14 | 14 | 10 | 15 | 9 | 13 | 6 | 5 | 2 | 3 | 2 | 12 | | | | | 1 | 29 |
| Peil.nl | 17 May 2020 | 32 | 18 | 17 | 10 | 13 | 10 | 19 | 8 | 5 | 1 | 4 | 1 | 11 | | | | | 1 | 13 |
| I&O Research | 15 May 2020 | 43 | 13 | 13 | 8 | 16 | 11 | 15 | 7 | 5 | 1 | 4 | 1 | 12 | | | | | 1 | 27 |
| Peil.nl | 10 May 2020 | 32 | 18 | 17 | 10 | 13 | 10 | 19 | 8 | 5 | 1 | 4 | 1 | 11 | | | | | 1 | 13 |
| Peil.nl | 3 May 2020 | 31 | 18 | 16 | 10 | 12 | 10 | 18 | 8 | 5 | 6 | 4 | 2 | 10 | | | | | 0 | 13 |
| | 3 May 2020 | Henk Krol splits from 50PLUS, forming the Group Krol-van Kooten (Party for the Future) | | | | | | | | | | | | | | | | | | |
| Ipsos | 26 Apr 2020 | 39 | 14 | 14 | 12 | 13 | 8 | 15 | 7 | 5 | 8 | 3 | 2 | 10 | | | | | 0 | 24 |
| Peil.nl | 26 Apr 2020 | 30 | 17 | 15 | 11 | 11 | 9 | 18 | 8 | 5 | 8 | 4 | 2 | 12 | | | | | 0 | 12 |
| Ipsos | 31 Mar 2020 | 35 | 15 | 14 | 13 | 14 | 7 | 15 | 6 | 6 | 10 | 3 | 2 | 10 | | | | | 0 | 20 |
| I&O Research | 30 Mar 2020 | 36 | 15 | 14 | 9 | 16 | 9 | 14 | 7 | 6 | 7 | 4 | 1 | 12 | | | | | 0 | 21 |
| I&O Research | 13 Mar 2020 | 27 | 17 | 14 | 10 | 17 | 9 | 14 | 6 | 6 | 10 | 4 | 1 | 15 | | | | | 0 | 10 |
| Peil.nl | 8 Mar 2020 | 20 | 19 | 13 | 14 | 12 | 10 | 17 | 6 | 6 | 10 | 4 | 3 | 16 | | | | | 0 | 1 |
| Peil.nl | 1 Mar 2020 | 20 | 19 | 13 | 14 | 12 | 10 | 17 | 6 | 6 | 10 | 4 | 3 | 16 | | | | | 0 | 1 |
| Ipsos | 25 Feb 2020 | 27 | 18 | 14 | 13 | 15 | 7 | 14 | 6 | 6 | 10 | 3 | 2 | 15 | | | | | 0 | 9 |
| Peil.nl | 23 Feb 2020 | 20 | 19 | 13 | 14 | 12 | 10 | 17 | 6 | 6 | 10 | 4 | 3 | 16 | | | | | 0 | 1 |
| Peil.nl | 16 Feb 2020 | 20 | 19 | 14 | 13 | 12 | 9 | 18 | 6 | 6 | 9 | 4 | 3 | 16 | | | | | 1 | 1 |
| Peil.nl | 9 Feb 2020 | 20 | 19 | 14 | 13 | 12 | 9 | 18 | 6 | 6 | 9 | 4 | 3 | 16 | | | | | 1 | 1 |
| Peil.nl | 2 Feb 2020 | 19 | 19 | 14 | 13 | 12 | 9 | 18 | 6 | 6 | 9 | 4 | 3 | 17 | | | | | 1 | Tie |
| Ipsos | 28 Jan 2020 | 28 | 16 | 14 | 13 | 15 | 8 | 14 | 6 | 6 | 9 | 3 | 2 | 16 | | | | | 0 | 12 |
| Peil.nl | 26 Jan 2020 | 19 | 19 | 14 | 13 | 12 | 9 | 18 | 6 | 6 | 9 | 4 | 3 | 17 | | | | | 1 (Note: Allied local parties (Code Orange and OSF) with 1 seat) | Tie |
| Peil.nl | 19 Jan 2020 | 19 | 19 | 14 | 13 | 12 | 9 | 18 | 6 | 6 | 9 | 4 | 3 | 17 | | | | | 1 | Tie |
| I&O Research | 17 Jan 2020 | 27 | 16 | 15 | 11 | 18 | 9 | 13 | 9 | 5 | 8 | 4 | 1 | 14 | | | | | 0 | 9 |
| Peil.nl | 12 Jan 2020 | 19 | 19 | 14 | 13 | 12 | 9 | 18 | 6 | 6 | 9 | 4 | 3 | 17 | | | | | 1 | Tie |
| Ipsos | 24 Dec 2019 | 27 | 17 | 17 | 11 | 16 | 8 | 15 | 6 | 5 | 9 | 3 | 2 | 14 | | | | | 0 | 10 |
| Peil.nl | 22 Dec 2019 | 19 | 19 | 15 | 12 | 12 | 9 | 19 | 7 | 6 | 7 | 3 | 3 | 18 | | | | | 1 | Tie |
| Peil.nl | 15 Dec 2019 | 19 | 19 | 15 | 12 | 12 | 9 | 19 | 7 | 6 | 7 | 3 | 3 | 18 | | | | | 1 | Tie |
| Peil.nl | 8 Dec 2019 | 19 | 19 | 16 | 12 | 13 | 9 | 19 | 7 | 5 | 7 | 2 | 3 | 18 | | | | | 1 | Tie |
| Peil.nl | 1 Dec 2019 | 22 | 18 | 15 | 12 | 13 | 9 | 19 | 7 | 5 | 7 | 2 | 3 | 17 | | | | | 1 | 3 |
| Ipsos | 26 Nov 2019 | 27 | 18 | 18 | 12 | 16 | 8 | 13 | 5 | 6 | 8 | 3 | 2 | 14 | | | | | 0 | 9 |
| Peil.nl | 24 Nov 2019 | 24 | 18 | 14 | 13 | 13 | 8 | 20 | 6 | 4 | 7 | 2 | 3 | 17 | | | | | 1 | 4 |
| Peil.nl | 17 Nov 2019 | 24 | 18 | 14 | 13 | 13 | 8 | 20 | 6 | 4 | 7 | 2 | 3 | 17 | | | | | 1 | 4 |
| I&O Research | 15 Nov 2019 | 26 | 18 | 15 | 11 | 18 | 10 | 15 | 7 | 5 | 6 | 4 | 1 | 14 | | | | | 0 | 8 |
| Kantar Public | 15 Nov 2019 | 30 | 18 | 12 | 10 | 17 | 9 | 16 | 8 | 7 | 6 | 4 | 1 | 12 | | | | | 0 | 12 |
| Peil.nl | 10 Nov 2019 | 26 | 18 | 14 | 13 | 12 | 9 | 20 | 6 | 4 | 7 | 2 | 3 | 15 | | | | | 1 | 6 |
| Peil.nl | 3 Nov 2019 | 27 | 17 | 15 | 13 | 12 | 9 | 20 | 6 | 4 | 7 | 2 | 3 | 14 | | | | | 1 | 7 |
| Ipsos | 29 Oct 2019 | 34 | 16 | 15 | 14 | 14 | 8 | 15 | 7 | 4 | 6 | 3 | 2 | 12 | | | | | 0 | 18 |
| Peil.nl | 27 Oct 2019 | 27 | 17 | 15 | 13 | 12 | 9 | 20 | 6 | 4 | 7 | 2 | 3 | 14 | | | | | 1 | 7 |
| Peil.nl | 20 Oct 2019 | 27 | 17 | 15 | 13 | 12 | 9 | 20 | 6 | 4 | 7 | 2 | 3 | 14 | | | | | 1 | 7 |
| I&O Research | 18 Oct 2019 | 30 | 15 | 16 | 11 | 16 | 7 | 16 | 8 | 6 | 7 | 4 | 2 | 12 | | | | | 0 | 14 |
| Kantar Public | 15 Oct 2019 | 31 | 15 | 12 | 11 | 16 | 7 | 16 | 8 | 6 | 9 | 3 | 3 | 13 | | | | | 0 | 15 |
| Peil.nl | 13 Oct 2019 | 28 | 15 | 16 | 12 | 12 | 9 | 20 | 6 | 7 | 6 | 2 | 3 | 13 | | | | | 1 | 8 |
| Peil.nl | 6 Oct 2019 | 28 | 15 | 16 | 12 | 12 | 9 | 20 | 6 | 7 | 6 | 2 | 3 | 13 | | | | | 1 | 8 |
| Peil.nl | 29 Sep 2019 | 28 | 15 | 16 | 11 | 13 | 9 | 20 | 6 | 7 | 6 | 2 | 3 | 13 | | | | | 1 | 8 |
| Ipsos | 24 Sep 2019 | 33 | 17 | 15 | 15 | 14 | 9 | 13 | 7 | 6 | 5 | 3 | 2 | 11 | | | | | 0 | 16 |
| Peil.nl | 22 Sep 2019 | 28 | 15 | 16 | 11 | 13 | 9 | 20 | 6 | 7 | 6 | 2 | 3 | 13 | | | | | 1 | 8 |
| Kantar Public | 15 Sep 2019 | 26 | 15 | 14 | 12 | 18 | 10 | 13 | 8 | 7 | 9 | 4 | 1 | 13 | | | | | 0 | 8 |
| Peil.nl | 15 Sep 2019 | 28 | 14 | 16 | 11 | 14 | 9 | 19 | 6 | 7 | 6 | 2 | 3 | 14 | | | | | 1 | 9 |
| Peil.nl | 8 Sep 2019 | 28 | 14 | 16 | 11 | 14 | 9 | 19 | 6 | 7 | 6 | 2 | 3 | 14 | | | | | 1 | 9 |
| I&O Research | 4 Sep 2019 | 32 | 13 | 15 | 11 | 17 | 9 | 16 | 8 | 6 | 7 | 4 | 1 | 11 | | | | | 0 | 15 |
| Ipsos | 4 Sep 2019 | 33 | 15 | 16 | 13 | 14 | 9 | 14 | 7 | 8 | 5 | 3 | 2 | 11 | | | | | 0 | 17 |
| Peil.nl | 1 Sep 2019 | 27 | 13 | 16 | 11 | 15 | 8 | 19 | 6 | 7 | 6 | 2 | 3 | 16 | | | | | 1 | 8 |
| Peil.nl | 25 Aug 2019 | 27 | 13 | 16 | 11 | 15 | 8 | 19 | 6 | 7 | 6 | 2 | 3 | 16 | | | | | 1 | 8 |
| Peil.nl | 4 Aug 2019 | 27 | 11 | 16 | 10 | 15 | 7 | 19 | 6 | 7 | 5 | 2 | 3 | 20 | | | | | 2 (Note: Allied local parties (Code Orange and OSF) with 2 seats) | 7 |
| Ipsos | 31 Jul 2019 | 32 | 11 | 15 | 13 | 16 | 8 | 14 | 7 | 6 | 6 | 3 | 1 | 18 | | | | | 0 | 14 |
| Peil.nl | 29 Jul 2019 | 27 | 11 | 16 | 10 | 15 | 7 | 19 | 6 | 7 | 5 | 2 | 3 | 20 | | | | | 2 | 7 |
| I&O Research | 10 Jul 2019 | 29 | 9 | 15 | 10 | 19 | 8 | 15 | 6 | 6 | 5 | 3 | 2 | 23 | | | | | 0 | 6 |
| Peil.nl | 7 Jul 2019 | 26 | 9 | 15 | 9 | 15 | 7 | 19 | 7 | 8 | 5 | 2 | 4 | 22 | | | | | 2 | 4 |
| Peil.nl | 1 Jul 2019 | 26 | 9 | 15 | 10 | 15 | 7 | 19 | 7 | 7 | 5 | 2 | 4 | 22 | | | | | 2 | 4 |
| Ipsos | 24 Jun 2019 | 31 | 11 | 13 | 11 | 17 | 9 | 14 | 6 | 6 | 6 | 3 | 2 | 21 | | | | | 0 | 10 |
| Peil.nl | 23 Jun 2019 | 27 | 9 | 15 | 10 | 14 | 7 | 19 | 7 | 8 | 5 | 2 | 4 | 21 | | | | | 2 | 6 |
| Peil.nl | 16 Jun 2019 | 27 | 9 | 15 | 10 | 14 | 7 | 19 | 7 | 8 | 5 | 2 | 4 | 21 | | | | | 2 | 6 |
| Peil.nl | 9 Jun 2019 | 27 | 8 | 15 | 10 | 14 | 8 | 18 | 7 | 8 | 5 | 2 | 4 | 22 | | | | | 2 | 5 |
| Peil.nl | 2 Jun 2019 | 27 | 8 | 15 | 10 | 14 | 8 | 18 | 7 | 8 | 5 | 2 | 4 | 22 | | | | | 2 | 5 |
| Peil.nl | 26 May 2019 | 25 | 8 | 15 | 10 | 16 | 8 | 16 | 7 | 8 | 5 | 2 | 4 | 24 | | | | | 2 | 1 |
| Ipsos | 21 May 2019 | 29 | 12 | 15 | 13 | 16 | 9 | 11 | 6 | 5 | 6 | 3 | 3 | 22 | | | | | 0 | 7 |
| Peil.nl | 19 May 2019 | 25 | 8 | 15 | 11 | 15 | 8 | 15 | 7 | 8 | 4 | 2 | 4 | 27 | | | | | 1 | 2 |
| I&O Research | 14 May 2019 | 26 | 13 | 14 | 10 | 18 | 10 | 12 | 7 | 6 | 5 | 4 | 3 | 22 | | | | | 0 | 4 |
| Peil.nl | 12 May 2019 | 24 | 9 | 15 | 11 | 16 | 8 | 15 | 7 | 8 | 4 | 2 | 4 | 26 | | | | | 1 | 2 |
| Peil.nl | 5 May 2019 | 23 | 9 | 14 | 11 | 17 | 9 | 14 | 7 | 8 | 4 | 2 | 4 | 27 | | | | | 1 | 4 |
| Ipsos | 29 Apr 2019 | 27 | 14 | 14 | 11 | 14 | 10 | 10 | 6 | 8 | 5 | 3 | 3 | 25 | | | | | 0 | 2 |
| Peil.nl | 28 Apr 2019 | 22 | 9 | 15 | 11 | 18 | 9 | 14 | 7 | 8 | 4 | 2 | 4 | 26 | | | | | 1 | 4 |
| Kantar Public | 25 Apr 2019 | 27 | 11 | 11 | 10 | 19 | 8 | 12 | 8 | 6 | 6 | 2 | 2 | 28 | | | | | – | 1 |
| I&O Research | 24 Apr 2019 | 27 | 11 | 12 | 13 | 20 | 10 | 11 | 5 | 5 | 6 | 4 | 2 | 24 | | | | | 0 | 3 |
| Peil.nl | 21 Apr 2019 | 22 | 8 | 15 | 11 | 18 | 9 | 13 | 7 | 8 | 4 | 2 | 4 | 28 | | | | | 1 | 6 |
| Peil.nl | 14 Apr 2019 | 22 | 8 | 15 | 11 | 18 | 9 | 13 | 7 | 8 | 4 | 2 | 4 | 28 | | | | | 1 | 6 |
| Peil.nl | 7 Apr 2019 | 22 | 8 | 15 | 11 | 18 | 9 | 13 | 7 | 8 | 4 | 2 | 4 | 28 | | | | | 1 | 6 |
| Peil.nl | 31 Mar 2019 | 23 | 9 | 14 | 11 | 18 | 9 | 13 | 7 | 8 | 4 | 2 | 4 | 27 | | | | | 1 | 4 |
| Peil.nl | 24 Mar 2019 | 23 | 10 | 14 | 12 | 18 | 9 | 13 | 7 | 7 | 4 | 2 | 4 | 26 | | | | | 1 | 3 |
| Ipsos | 21 Mar 2019 | 26 | 19 | 14 | 13 | 15 | 10 | 9 | 7 | 7 | 7 | 3 | 3 | 17 | | | | | 0 | 7 |
| I&O Research | 18 Mar 2019 | 23 | 15 | 15 | 11 | 19 | 12 | 11 | 7 | 7 | 5 | 3 | 2 | 20 | | | | | 0 | 3 |
| Peil.nl | 16 Mar 2019 | 22 | 15 | 10 | 11 | 17 | 12 | 12 | 7 | 7 | 5 | 3 | 7 | 20 | | | | | 2 | 2 |
| I&O Research | 12 Mar 2019 | 24 | 15 | 15 | 11 | 18 | 15 | 10 | 8 | 5 | 5 | 3 | 3 | 18 | | | | | 0 | 6 |
| Peil.nl | 10 Mar 2019 | 23 | 15 | 9 | 9 | 18 | 11 | 13 | 7 | 8 | 5 | 3 | 7 | 19 | | | | | 3 (Note: Allied local parties (Code Orange and OSF) with 3 seats) | 4 |
| Peil.nl | 3 Mar 2019 | 23 | 17 | 10 | 9 | 18 | 12 | 14 | 7 | 8 | 5 | 3 | 7 | 17 | | | | | – | 5 |
| I&O Research | 26 Feb 2019 | 23 | 17 | 12 | 11 | 20 | 14 | 10 | 7 | 7 | 6 | 4 | 3 | 16 | | | | | 0 | 3 |
| Ipsos | 24 Feb 2019 | 28 | 19 | 13 | 14 | 17 | 11 | 9 | 7 | 6 | 6 | 3 | 3 | 14 | | | | | 0 | 9 |
| Peil.nl | 24 Feb 2019 | 22 | 18 | 9 | 9 | 18 | 12 | 14 | 7 | 8 | 5 | 3 | 7 | 18 | | | | | – | 4 |
| Peil.nl | 17 Feb 2019 | 23 | 18 | 10 | 10 | 17 | 12 | 14 | 7 | 7 | 5 | 3 | 7 | 17 | | | | | – | 5 |
| Kantar Public | 12 Feb 2019 | 28 | 18 | 14 | 14 | 17 | 13 | 9 | 8 | 4 | 6 | 3 | 2 | 14 | | | | | – | 10 |
| Peil.nl | 10 Feb 2019 | 23 | 18 | 10 | 10 | 17 | 12 | 14 | 7 | 7 | 5 | 3 | 7 | 17 | | | | | – | 5 |
| Peil.nl | 3 Feb 2019 | 22 | 18 | 10 | 10 | 17 | 13 | 15 | 6 | 8 | 4 | 3 | 7 | 17 | | | | | – | 4 |
| Ipsos | 28 Jan 2019 | 27 | 20 | 14 | 13 | 18 | 12 | 9 | 7 | 7 | 5 | 3 | 3 | 12 | | | | | 0 | 7 |
| Peil.nl | 27 Jan 2019 | 22 | 18 | 10 | 10 | 17 | 13 | 15 | 6 | 8 | 4 | 3 | 7 | 17 | | | | | – | 4 |
| I&O Research | 22 Jan 2019 | 25 | 18 | 15 | 11 | 18 | 13 | 11 | 7 | 6 | 4 | 4 | 2 | 16 | | | | | 0 | 7 |
| Peil.nl | 20 Jan 2019 | 22 | 18 | 10 | 10 | 17 | 13 | 15 | 6 | 8 | 4 | 3 | 7 | 17 | | | | | – | 4 |
| Peil.nl | 13 Jan 2019 | 22 | 18 | 11 | 10 | 17 | 12 | 15 | 7 | 8 | 4 | 3 | 7 | 16 | | | | | – | 4 |
| Kantar Public | 12 Jan 2019 | 28 | 17 | 16 | 15 | 19 | 12 | 10 | 7 | 5 | 4 | 3 | 3 | 12 | | | | | – | 9 |
| Ipsos | 17 Dec 2018 | 29 | 19 | 15 | 14 | 16 | 12 | 9 | 7 | 8 | 5 | 3 | 3 | 10 | | | | | 0 | 10 |
| Peil.nl | 16 Dec 2018 | 22 | 18 | 11 | 10 | 17 | 12 | 15 | 7 | 8 | 4 | 3 | 7 | 16 | | | | | – | 4 |
| Kantar Public | 11 Dec 2018 | 30 | 20 | 13 | 12 | 16 | 15 | 9 | 9 | 5 | 3 | 3 | 2 | 13 | | | | | – | 10 |
| Peil.nl | 9 Dec 2018 | 22 | 18 | 11 | 10 | 17 | 12 | 15 | 7 | 8 | 4 | 3 | 7 | 16 | | | | | – | 4 |
| Peil.nl | 2 Dec 2018 | 23 | 19 | 11 | 10 | 17 | 12 | 15 | 7 | 8 | 4 | 3 | 7 | 14 | | | | | – | 4 |
| I&O Research | 27 Nov 2018 | 27 | 18 | 15 | 12 | 19 | 15 | 10 | 6 | 5 | 4 | 4 | 3 | 12 | | | | | 0 | 8 |
| Ipsos | 26 Nov 2018 | 29 | 21 | 15 | 12 | 17 | 12 | 10 | 6 | 7 | 5 | 3 | 3 | 10 | | | | | 0 | 8 |
| Peil.nl | 25 Nov 2018 | 23 | 20 | 11 | 10 | 17 | 13 | 15 | 6 | 8 | 5 | 3 | 7 | 12 | | | | | – | 3 |
| Peil.nl | 18 Nov 2018 | 24 | 19 | 11 | 10 | 16 | 14 | 15 | 5 | 8 | 5 | 3 | 7 | 13 | | | | | – | 5 |
| Peil.nl | 11 Nov 2018 | 24 | 19 | 11 | 10 | 16 | 14 | 15 | 5 | 8 | 5 | 3 | 7 | 13 | | | | | – | 5 |
| Peil.nl | 4 Nov 2018 | 24 | 19 | 11 | 10 | 16 | 14 | 15 | 5 | 8 | 5 | 3 | 7 | 13 | | | | | – | 5 |
| Ipsos | 29 Oct 2018 | 31 | 22 | 15 | 13 | 16 | 11 | 10 | 6 | 6 | 6 | 3 | 2 | 9 | | | | | 0 | 9 |
| Peil.nl | 28 Oct 2018 | 24 | 18 | 11 | 9 | 18 | 13 | 14 | 6 | 8 | 5 | 3 | 7 | 14 | | | | | – | 6 |
| Peil.nl | 21 Oct 2018 | 24 | 18 | 11 | 9 | 18 | 13 | 14 | 6 | 8 | 5 | 3 | 7 | 14 | | | | | – | 6 |
| Peil.nl | 14 Oct 2018 | 24 | 18 | 11 | 9 | 18 | 13 | 14 | 6 | 8 | 5 | 3 | 7 | 14 | | | | | – | 6 |
| Peil.nl | 7 Oct 2018 | 24 | 18 | 11 | 9 | 18 | 13 | 14 | 6 | 8 | 5 | 3 | 7 | 14 | | | | | – | 6 |
| Peil.nl | 30 Sep 2018 | 26 | 18 | 11 | 9 | 18 | 13 | 13 | 6 | 8 | 5 | 3 | 7 | 13 | | | | | – | 8 |
| Ipsos | 23 Sep 2018 | 31 | 20 | 16 | 13 | 17 | 12 | 8 | 6 | 8 | 5 | 3 | 2 | 9 | | | | | 0 | 11 |
| Peil.nl | 23 Sep 2018 | 26 | 17 | 11 | 10 | 18 | 12 | 13 | 6 | 8 | 5 | 3 | 7 | 14 | | | | | – | 8 |
| Kantar Public | 16 Sep 2018 | 27 | 20 | 14 | 12 | 19 | 14 | 10 | 9 | 6 | 5 | 3 | 2 | 9 | | | | | – | 7 |
| Peil.nl | 16 Sep 2018 | 26 | 15 | 11 | 10 | 18 | 13 | 12 | 6 | 8 | 5 | 3 | 7 | 16 | | | | | – | 8 |
| I&O Research | 11 Sep 2018 | 26 | 15 | 15 | 13 | 19 | 14 | 11 | 7 | 6 | 5 | 4 | 3 | 12 | | | | | 0 | 7 |
| Peil.nl | 9 Sep 2018 | 27 | 16 | 11 | 11 | 17 | 12 | 12 | 6 | 8 | 5 | 3 | 6 | 16 | | | | | – | 10 |
| Ipsos | 3 Sep 2018 | 32 | 18 | 17 | 13 | 16 | 14 | 8 | 6 | 7 | 5 | 3 | 2 | 9 | | | | | 0 | 14 |
| Peil.nl | 2 Sep 2018 | 29 | 16 | 11 | 12 | 16 | 12 | 11 | 6 | 7 | 5 | 3 | 6 | 16 | | | | | – | 13 |
| Peil.nl | 26 Aug 2018 | 29 | 16 | 11 | 12 | 16 | 12 | 11 | 6 | 7 | 5 | 3 | 6 | 16 | | | | | – | 13 |
| Peil.nl | 19 Aug 2018 | 29 | 15 | 12 | 13 | 16 | 12 | 11 | 6 | 7 | 5 | 3 | 6 | 15 | | | | | – | 13 |
| Ipsos | 30 Jul 2018 | 33 | 18 | 16 | 14 | 15 | 12 | 7 | 6 | 8 | 6 | 3 | 3 | 9 | | | | | 0 | 15 |
| Peil.nl | 8 Jul 2018 | 30 | 15 | 12 | 13 | 17 | 11 | 10 | 6 | 7 | 5 | 3 | 6 | 15 | | | | | – | 13 |
| Peil.nl | 1 Jul 2018 | 28 | 15 | 12 | 13 | 17 | 10 | 11 | 6 | 7 | 6 | 3 | 6 | 16 | | | | | – | 11 |
| I&O Research | 29 Jun 2018 | 27 | 16 | 16 | 14 | 19 | 11 | 11 | 7 | 6 | 6 | 3 | 3 | 11 | | | | | 0 | 8 |
| Ipsos | 25 Jun 2018 | 32 | 17 | 17 | 15 | 16 | 11 | 8 | 6 | 7 | 5 | 3 | 4 | 9 | | | | | 0 | 15 |
| Peil.nl | 24 Jun 2018 | 27 | 14 | 12 | 13 | 17 | 11 | 11 | 6 | 8 | 6 | 3 | 6 | 16 | | | | | – | 10 |
| Peil.nl | 17 Jun 2018 | 27 | 14 | 12 | 13 | 16 | 12 | 11 | 6 | 8 | 6 | 3 | 6 | 16 | | | | | – | 11 |
| Kantar Public | 13 Jun 2018 | 32 | 21 | 15 | 14 | 15 | 11 | 10 | 8 | 5 | 6 | 2 | 2 | 9 | | | | | – | 11 |
| Peil.nl | 10 Jun 2018 | 27 | 14 | 12 | 13 | 16 | 12 | 11 | 6 | 8 | 6 | 3 | 6 | 16 | | | | | – | 11 |
| Peil.nl | 3 Jun 2018 | 26 | 14 | 12 | 13 | 16 | 13 | 11 | 6 | 8 | 6 | 3 | 6 | 16 | | | | | – | 10 |
| Ipsos | 28 May 2018 | 32 | 16 | 17 | 15 | 18 | 11 | 8 | 6 | 7 | 5 | 3 | 3 | 9 | | | | | 0 | 14 |
| Peil.nl | 27 May 2018 | 26 | 13 | 13 | 12 | 17 | 13 | 12 | 6 | 8 | 6 | 3 | 5 | 16 | | | | | – | 9 |
| Peil.nl | 20 May 2018 | 25 | 13 | 13 | 12 | 17 | 14 | 12 | 5 | 8 | 7 | 3 | 5 | 16 | | | | | – | 8 |
| Peil.nl | 13 May 2018 | 25 | 13 | 13 | 12 | 17 | 14 | 12 | 5 | 8 | 7 | 3 | 5 | 16 | | | | | – | 8 |
| Peil.nl | 6 May 2018 | 24 | 13 | 13 | 12 | 17 | 15 | 12 | 5 | 8 | 7 | 3 | 5 | 16 | | | | | – | 7 |
| Peil.nl | 29 Apr 2018 | 24 | 13 | 13 | 12 | 17 | 15 | 12 | 5 | 8 | 7 | 3 | 5 | 16 | | | | | – | 7 |
| Ipsos | 23 Apr 2018 | 33 | 14 | 15 | 14 | 18 | 12 | 8 | 7 | 7 | 6 | 3 | 3 | 10 | | | | | 0 | 15 |
| Peil.nl | 22 Apr 2018 | 25 | 12 | 15 | 13 | 16 | 14 | 11 | 6 | 8 | 7 | 3 | 5 | 15 | | | | | – | 9 |
| Peil.nl | 15 Apr 2018 | 25 | 12 | 15 | 13 | 16 | 14 | 11 | 6 | 8 | 7 | 3 | 5 | 15 | | | | | – | 9 |
| Peil.nl | 8 Apr 2018 | 25 | 12 | 15 | 13 | 16 | 14 | 11 | 6 | 8 | 7 | 3 | 5 | 15 | | | | | – | 9 |
| Peil.nl | 1 Apr 2018 | 24 | 11 | 15 | 13 | 16 | 14 | 12 | 6 | 8 | 7 | 3 | 5 | 16 | | | | | – | 8 |
| Peil.nl | 25 Mar 2018 | 24 | 11 | 15 | 13 | 16 | 14 | 12 | 6 | 8 | 7 | 3 | 5 | 16 | | | | | – | 8 |
| Ipsos | 19 Mar 2018 | 32 | 16 | 16 | 16 | 14 | 13 | 8 | 6 | 7 | 7 | 3 | 3 | 9 | | | | | 0 | 16 |
| Peil.nl | 18 Mar 2018 | 26 | 12 | 14 | 13 | 14 | 15 | 12 | 7 | 7 | 7 | 3 | 4 | 16 | | | | | – | 10 |
| I&O Research | 12 Mar 2018 | 27 | 16 | 16 | 16 | 16 | 13 | 12 | 7 | 5 | 6 | 3 | 3 | 10 | | | | | 0 | 11 |
| Peil.nl | 11 Mar 2018 | 25 | 13 | 14 | 14 | 14 | 16 | 12 | 7 | 7 | 7 | 3 | 3 | 15 | | | | | – | 9 |
| Kantar Public | 4 Mar 2018 | 30 | 16 | 15 | 15 | 16 | 16 | 9 | 6 | 6 | 6 | 3 | 3 | 9 | | | | | – | 14 |
| Peil.nl | 4 Mar 2018 | 26 | 14 | 13 | 13 | 14 | 16 | 12 | 7 | 7 | 7 | 3 | 3 | 15 | | | | | – | 10 |
| Ipsos | 26 Feb 2018 | 31 | 15 | 15 | 16 | 14 | 13 | 8 | 5 | 8 | 6 | 3 | 4 | 12 | | | | | 0 | 15 |
| Peil.nl | 25 Feb 2018 | 26 | 14 | 13 | 13 | 14 | 16 | 12 | 7 | 7 | 7 | 3 | 3 | 15 | | | | | – | 10 |
| Peil.nl | 18 Feb 2018 | 27 | 14 | 14 | 14 | 14 | 15 | 12 | 6 | 7 | 6 | 3 | 3 | 15 | | | | | – | 12 |
| Peil.nl | 11 Feb 2018 | 27 | 15 | 15 | 16 | 14 | 14 | 12 | 5 | 7 | 5 | 3 | 3 | 14 | | | | | – | 11 |
| I&O Research | 6 Feb 2018 | 29 | 16 | 14 | 18 | 16 | 12 | 10 | 6 | 6 | 5 | 3 | 2 | 13 | | | | | 0 | 12 |
| Peil.nl | 4 Feb 2018 | 27 | 15 | 14 | 16 | 13 | 14 | 13 | 5 | 7 | 5 | 3 | 3 | 15 | | | | | – | 11 |
| Ipsos | 29 Jan 2018 | 31 | 16 | 15 | 16 | 14 | 13 | 9 | 5 | 7 | 5 | 3 | 4 | 12 | | | | | 0 | 15 |
| Kantar Public | 28 Jan 2018 | 28 | 18 | 14 | 17 | 16 | 15 | 11 | 6 | 4 | 4 | 3 | 2 | 12 | | | | | – | 10 |
| Peil.nl | 28 Jan 2018 | 27 | 15 | 14 | 16 | 13 | 14 | 13 | 5 | 7 | 5 | 3 | 3 | 15 | | | | | – | 11 |
| Peil.nl | 21 Jan 2018 | 27 | 15 | 14 | 16 | 13 | 14 | 13 | 5 | 7 | 5 | 3 | 3 | 15 | | | | | – | 11 |
| Peil.nl | 14 Jan 2018 | 27 | 14 | 14 | 15 | 14 | 14 | 14 | 5 | 7 | 5 | 3 | 3 | 15 | | | | | 0 | 12 |
| Peil.nl | 24 Dec 2017 | 27 | 14 | 14 | 15 | 14 | 14 | 14 | 5 | 7 | 5 | 3 | 3 | 15 | | | | | – | 12 |
| GfK | 18 Dec 2017 | 29 | 21 | 15 | 15 | 13 | 15 | 11 | 6 | 5 | 5 | 3 | 2 | 10 | | | | | – | 8 |
| Ipsos | 18 Dec 2017 | 31 | 18 | 14 | 16 | 13 | 12 | 10 | 6 | 6 | 5 | 3 | 4 | 12 | | | | | 0 | 13 |
| Peil.nl | 17 Dec 2017 | 25 | 14 | 14 | 17 | 13 | 14 | 15 | 5 | 7 | 5 | 3 | 3 | 15 | | | | | – | 8 |
| Peil.nl | 10 Dec 2017 | 26 | 15 | 14 | 16 | 13 | 13 | 15 | 6 | 7 | 5 | 3 | 3 | 14 | | | | | – | 10 |
| Peil.nl | 3 Dec 2017 | 26 | 15 | 14 | 16 | 13 | 13 | 15 | 6 | 7 | 5 | 3 | 3 | 14 | | | | | – | 10 |
| Ipsos | 30 Nov 2017 | 31 | 19 | 14 | 18 | 15 | 9 | 10 | 6 | 6 | 5 | 3 | 3 | 11 | | | | | 0 | 12 |
| GfK | 27 Nov 2017 | 28 | 23 | 14 | 18 | 13 | 13 | 11 | 6 | 4 | 7 | 3 | 1 | 9 | | | | | – | 5 |
| Peil.nl | 26 Nov 2017 | 28 | 15 | 15 | 16 | 13 | 12 | 14 | 6 | 7 | 6 | 3 | 3 | 12 | | | | | – | 12 |
| Peil.nl | 19 Nov 2017 | 28 | 16 | 15 | 17 | 14 | 13 | 13 | 5 | 6 | 5 | 3 | 3 | 12 | | | | | – | 11 |
| Peil.nl | 12 Nov 2017 | 28 | 16 | 15 | 17 | 14 | 13 | 13 | 5 | 6 | 5 | 3 | 3 | 12 | | | | | – | 11 |
| Peil.nl | 5 Nov 2017 | 29 | 16 | 16 | 18 | 13 | 12 | 13 | 5 | 6 | 5 | 3 | 3 | 11 | | | | | – | 11 |
| Ipsos | 2 Nov 2017 | 32 | 19 | 15 | 18 | 15 | 9 | 8 | 6 | 6 | 6 | 3 | 4 | 9 | | | | | 0 | 13 |
| GfK | 31 Oct 2017 | 30 | 21 | 16 | 17 | 13 | 12 | 12 | 6 | 6 | 4 | 3 | 2 | 8 | | | | | – | 9 |
| I&O Research | 30 Oct 2017 | 30 | 18 | 15 | 18 | 16 | 11 | 10 | 6 | 5 | 5 | 3 | 2 | 11 | | | | | 0 | 12 |
| Peil.nl | 29 Oct 2017 | 29 | 17 | 16 | 18 | 14 | 11 | 12 | 5 | 6 | 5 | 3 | 3 | 11 | | | | | – | 11 |
| Kantar Public | 15 Oct 2017 | 29 | 21 | 15 | 17 | 15 | 12 | 10 | 6 | 6 | 5 | 3 | 2 | 9 | | | | | – | 8 |
| Peil.nl | 15 Oct 2017 | 29 | 18 | 16 | 18 | 14 | 11 | 12 | 5 | 6 | 5 | 3 | 3 | 10 | | | | | – | 11 |
| I&O Research | 11 Oct 2017 | 30 | 19 | 15 | 18 | 16 | 10 | 9 | 6 | 6 | 6 | 3 | 2 | 10 | | | | | 0 | 11 |
| Ipsos | 5 Oct 2017 | 34 | 18 | 15 | 20 | 15 | 9 | 7 | 5 | 7 | 5 | 2 | 4 | 9 | | | | | 0 | 14 |
| Peil.nl | 1 Oct 2017 | 31 | 18 | 15 | 19 | 14 | 11 | 12 | 5 | 6 | 4 | 3 | 3 | 9 | | | | | – | 12 |
| GfK | 25 Sep 2017 | 29 | 23 | 16 | 17 | 15 | 12 | 10 | 6 | 6 | 5 | 4 | 1 | 6 | | | | | – | 6 |
| Peil.nl | 24 Sep 2017 | 31 | 18 | 16 | 19 | 14 | 11 | 12 | 5 | 6 | 4 | 3 | 3 | 8 | | | | | – | 12 |
| Peil.nl | 17 Sep 2017 | 31 | 18 | 16 | 19 | 14 | 11 | 12 | 5 | 6 | 4 | 3 | 3 | 8 | | | | | – | 12 |
| Ipsos | 14 Sep 2017 | 35 | 19 | 16 | 19 | 13 | 9 | 8 | 6 | 6 | 5 | 3 | 3 | 8 | | | | | 0 | 16 |
| I&O Research | 11 Sep 2017 | 30 | 20 | 16 | 18 | 15 | 12 | 9 | 6 | 6 | 4 | 3 | 2 | 9 | | | | | 0 | 10 |
| Peil.nl | 10 Sep 2017 | 31 | 18 | 16 | 19 | 14 | 11 | 12 | 5 | 6 | 4 | 3 | 3 | 8 | | | | | – | 12 |
| GfK | 4 Sep 2017 | 30 | 23 | 16 | 19 | 14 | 11 | 9 | 7 | 6 | 5 | 3 | 2 | 5 | | | | | – | 7 |
| Peil.nl | 3 Sep 2017 | 31 | 19 | 17 | 18 | 13 | 12 | 12 | 5 | 6 | 4 | 3 | 3 | 7 | | | | | – | 12 |
| Kantar Public | 31 Aug 2017 | 31 | 22 | 16 | 18 | 16 | 11 | 9 | 5 | 5 | 4 | 3 | 2 | 8 | | | | | – | 9 |
| Peil.nl | 27 Aug 2017 | 31 | 20 | 17 | 18 | 13 | 12 | 11 | 5 | 6 | 4 | 3 | 3 | 7 | | | | | – | 11 |
| Peil.nl | 20 Aug 2017 | 31 | 20 | 17 | 18 | 13 | 12 | 11 | 5 | 6 | 4 | 3 | 3 | 7 | | | | | – | 11 |
| Ipsos | 10 Aug 2017 | 35 | 21 | 16 | 20 | 13 | 9 | 7 | 6 | 7 | 3 | 2 | 4 | 7 | | | | | 0 | 14 |
| Peil.nl | 30 Jul 2017 | 32 | 21 | 16 | 20 | 13 | 11 | 11 | 5 | 5 | 4 | 3 | 3 | 6 | | | | | – | 11 |
| GfK | 24 Jul 2017 | 30 | 26 | 17 | 18 | 12 | 13 | 10 | 5 | 5 | 4 | 3 | 2 | 5 | | | | | – | 4 |
| Peil.nl | 16 Jul 2017 | 33 | 21 | 16 | 20 | 13 | 11 | 11 | 5 | 5 | 3 | 3 | 3 | 6 | | | | | – | 12 |
| Ipsos | 13 Jul 2017 | 36 | 19 | 16 | 21 | 14 | 9 | 8 | 6 | 6 | 4 | 2 | 4 | 5 | | | | | 0 | 15 |
| Kantar Public | 12 Jul 2017 | 31 | 23 | 16 | 19 | 17 | 13 | 9 | 5 | 5 | 3 | 3 | 2 | 4 | | | | | – | 8 |
| Peil.nl | 2 Jul 2017 | 33 | 21 | 16 | 20 | 13 | 11 | 12 | 5 | 5 | 3 | 3 | 3 | 5 | | | | | – | 12 |
| Ipsos | 29 Jun 2017 | 36 | 20 | 17 | 20 | 16 | 7 | 8 | 6 | 5 | 3 | 2 | 4 | 6 | | | | | 0 | 16 |
| GfK | 26 Jun 2017 | 34 | 24 | 17 | 18 | 14 | 12 | 10 | 5 | 4 | 5 | 2 | 2 | 3 | | | | | – | 10 |
| I&O Research | 18 Jun 2017 | 31 | 23 | 16 | 19 | 15 | 12 | 10 | 6 | 5 | 4 | 3 | 2 | 4 | | | | | 0 | 8 |
| Peil.nl | 18 Jun 2017 | 33 | 21 | 17 | 20 | 14 | 11 | 10 | 5 | 5 | 3 | 3 | 3 | 5 | | | | | – | 12 |
| Ipsos | 15 Jun 2017 | 37 | 19 | 18 | 21 | 14 | 9 | 9 | 6 | 5 | 3 | 2 | 3 | 4 | | | | | 0 | 16 |
| Peil.nl | 4 Jun 2017 | 33 | 20 | 17 | 20 | 14 | 12 | 10 | 5 | 5 | 4 | 3 | 3 | 4 | | | | | – | 13 |
| Ipsos | 1 Jun 2017 | 37 | 19 | 18 | 20 | 15 | 9 | 7 | 6 | 5 | 4 | 2 | 3 | 5 | | | | | 0 | 17 |
| GfK | 29 May 2017 | 30 | 23 | 18 | 18 | 15 | 13 | 10 | 5 | 5 | 4 | 3 | 2 | 3 | | | | | 1 (Note: PP with 1 seat) | 7 |
| Peil.nl | 21 May 2017 | 32 | 20 | 18 | 19 | 14 | 13 | 9 | 5 | 5 | 5 | 3 | 3 | 4 | | | | | – | 12 |
| Ipsos | 19 May 2017 | 37 | 20 | 16 | 21 | 14 | 9 | 7 | 6 | 5 | 3 | 3 | 4 | 5 | | | | | 0 | 16 |
| Peil.nl | 14 May 2017 | 32 | 19 | 18 | 20 | 14 | 13 | 9 | 5 | 5 | 5 | 3 | 3 | 4 | | | | | – | 12 |
| Peil.nl | 7 May 2017 | 32 | 19 | 18 | 20 | 14 | 13 | 9 | 5 | 5 | 5 | 3 | 3 | 4 | | | | | – | 12 |
| Ipsos | 4 May 2017 | 37 | 21 | 17 | 21 | 15 | 8 | 7 | 6 | 5 | 3 | 3 | 3 | 4 | | | | | 0 | 16 |
| GfK | 24 Apr 2017 | 32 | 22 | 19 | 19 | 14 | 14 | 8 | 5 | 5 | 4 | 3 | 2 | 3 | | | | | – | 10 |
| Peil.nl | 23 Apr 2017 | 32 | 19 | 18 | 20 | 14 | 13 | 9 | 5 | 5 | 5 | 3 | 3 | 4 | | | | | – | 12 |
| Ipsos | 20 Apr 2017 | 38 | 19 | 17 | 20 | 16 | 9 | 6 | 5 | 6 | 3 | 3 | 3 | 5 | | | | | 0 | 18 |
| Peil.nl | 16 Apr 2017 | 32 | 19 | 18 | 20 | 14 | 13 | 9 | 5 | 5 | 5 | 3 | 3 | 4 | | | | | – | 12 |
| Peil.nl | 9 Apr 2017 | 32 | 19 | 19 | 20 | 14 | 14 | 9 | 5 | 5 | 4 | 3 | 3 | 3 | | | | | – | 12 |
| Ipsos | 6 Apr 2017 | 34 | 20 | 18 | 20 | 15 | 11 | 8 | 5 | 5 | 4 | 4 | 3 | 3 | | | | | 0 | 14 |
| Peil.nl | 2 Apr 2017 | 32 | 19 | 19 | 20 | 14 | 14 | 9 | 5 | 5 | 4 | 3 | 3 | 3 | | | | | – | 12 |
| Peil.nl | 26 Mar 2017 | 32 | 19 | 19 | 20 | 14 | 14 | 9 | 5 | 5 | 4 | 3 | 3 | 3 | | | | | – | 12 |
| 2017 election | 15 Mar 2017 | 33 | 20 | 19 | 19 | 14 | 14 | 9 | 5 | 5 | 4 | 3 | 3 | 2 | | | | | 0 | 13 |

=== Vote share ===
| Polling firm | Date | VVD | PVV | CDA | D66 | GL | SP | PvdA | CU | PvdD | 50+ | SGP | DENK | FvD | Others | Lead |
|---|---|---|---|---|---|---|---|---|---|---|---|---|---|---|---|---|
| I&O Research | 16 Mar 2021 | 21.0% | 12.3% | 10.7% | 12.0% | 7.0% | 6.9% | 7.5% | 3.9% | 3.2% | 1.0% | 2.4% | 1.8% | 3.4% | 8.2% | 0.3% |
| Ipsos | 22 Dec 2020 | 26.9% | 14.5% | 13.4% | 8.3% | 7.1% | 6.4% | 8.2% | 3.5% | 4.0% | 1.0% | 1.9% | 1.5% | 2.3% | 1.0% | 12.4% |
| Ipsos | 25 Nov 2020 | 24.6% | 12.7% | 11.5% | 10.0% | 8.2% | 6.7% | 9.3% | 4.2% | 3.8% | 1.2% | 1.9% | 1.3% | 3.8% | 0.9% | 11.9% |
| Ipsos | 27 Oct 2020 | 27.1% | 12.6% | 10.8% | 8.8% | 9.1% | 6.3% | 8.5% | 4.3% | 3.4% | 1.1% | 2.2% | 1.1% | 3.3% | 1.4% | 14.5% |
| Ipsos | 29 Sep 2020 | 25.6% | 12.9% | 10.8% | 8.6% | 8.1% | 6.7% | 8.8% | 3.9% | 4.4% | 1.5% | 1.9% | 1.0% | 5.0% | 0.8% | 12.7% |
| Ipsos | 1 Sep 2020 | 23.7% | 11.6% | 10.8% | 9.5% | 8.7% | 7.0% | 8.9% | 4.8% | 3.8% | 1.2% | 1.9% | 0.8% | 6.2% | 1.1% | 12.0% |
| I&O Research | 7 Jul 2020 | 24.9% | 10.4% | 11.1% | 9.1% | 10.3% | 6.1% | 8.0% | 4.4% | 3.1% | 0.5% | 2.9% | 0.5% | 7.9% | 0.8% | 13.8% |
| I&O Research | 9 Jun 2020 | 28.1% | 9.9% | 8.9% | 7.2% | 10.0% | 6.3% | 8.7% | 4.9% | 3.1% | 1.0% | 3.1% | 0.4% | 7.4% | 1.1% | 18.1% |
| I&O Research | 12 May 2020 | 28.4% | 8.4% | 8.5% | 5.2% | 10.5% | 7.1% | 9.7% | 4.8% | 3.5% | 0.7% | 3.1% | 0.7% | 8.2% | 1.1% | 17.9% |
| I&O Research | 30 Mar 2020 | 23.2% | 9.9% | 9.0% | 5.7% | 10.7% | 6.1% | 9.5% | 5.0% | 4.2% | 5.0% | 2.8% | 0.7% | 7.7% | 0.4% | 12.5% |
| I&O Research | 13 Mar 2020 | 18.0% | 11.0% | 9.6% | 6.5% | 11.1% | 6.0% | 9.5% | 4.1% | 4.0% | 6.6% | 2.6% | 0.9% | 9.8% | 0.4% | 6.9% |
| Ipsos | 28 Jan 2020 | 18.1% | 10.3% | 9.2% | 8.1% | 9.9% | 5.5% | 9.4% | 4.2% | 4.3% | 6.1% | 2.0% | 1.3% | 10.6% | 1.0% | 7.5% |
| I&O Research | 17 Jan 2020 | 17.6% | 10.7% | 9.7% | 7.3% | 11.8% | 6.1% | 8.8% | 5.8% | 3.3% | 5.3% | 2.7% | 0.9% | 9.2% | 0.6% | 5.8% |
| I&O Research | 15 Nov 2019 | 17.0% | 11.9% | 9.9% | 7.1% | 12.1% | 6.4% | 9.9% | 4.9% | 3.4% | 4.0% | 2.9% | 0.9% | 9.2% | 0.4% | 4.9% |
| I&O Research | 18 Oct 2019 | 19.3% | 10.2% | 10.6% | 7.5% | 10.5% | 4.6% | 10.6% | 5.4% | 4.0% | 4.7% | 2.7% | 1.9% | 7.8% | 0.2% | 8.7% |
| I&O Research | 4 Sep 2019 | 20.6% | 8.7% | 9.9% | 7.4% | 10.9% | 6.0% | 10.2% | 5.5% | 4.3% | 4.8% | 2.9% | 1.2% | 7.3% | 0.3% | 9.7% |
| Ipsos | 4 Sep 2019 | 20.9% | 9.9% | 10.7% | 8.4% | 9.3% | 5.8% | 9.1% | 4.4% | 5.1% | 3.5% | 2.4% | 1.8% | 7.3% | 1.4% | 10.2% |
| Ipsos | 31 Jul 2019 | 20.2% | 7.0% | 10.0% | 8.3% | 10.2% | 5.5% | 8.9% | 4.5% | 3.9% | 3.8% | 2.2% | 1.2% | 12.0% | 2.4% | 8.2% |
| I&O Research | 10 Jul 2019 | 18.5% | 5.7% | 9.9% | 7.0% | 12.4% | 5.5% | 9.9% | 4.4% | 3.8% | 3.7% | 2.3% | 1.9% | 14.8% | 0.3% | 3.7% |
| Ipsos | 24 Jun 2019 | 20.1% | 7.1% | 8.9% | 7.6% | 11.3% | 5.7% | 9.1% | 4.0% | 4.1% | 4.0% | 2.1% | 1.9% | 13.3% | 1.0% | 6.8% |
| EP election | - | 14.6% | 3.5% | 12.2% | 7.1% | 10.9% | 3.4% | 19.1% | 6.8% (Note: Common list of CU and SGP.) | 4.0% | 3.9% | 6.8% | 1.1% | 11.0% | 2.4% | 4.5% |
| Ipsos | 21 May 2019 | 18.7% | 8.2% | 9.9% | 8.6% | 10.6% | 6.0% | 7.0% | 4.0% | 3.8% | 4.1% | 2.3% | 2.0% | 14.0% | 0.8% | 4.7% |
| I&O Research | 14 May 2019 | 17.1% | 8.3% | 9.0% | 6.9% | 11.8% | 6.9% | 8.0% | 5.1% | 4.4% | 3.3% | 2.8% | 2.0% | 14.4% | 0.1% | 2.7% |
| Ipsos | 29 Apr 2019 | 17.3% | 9.5% | 9.0% | 7.4% | 9.0% | 6.4% | 6.7% | 4.3% | 5.1% | 3.8% | 2.5% | 2.4% | 16.5% | 0.2% | 0.8% |
| I&O Research | 24 Apr 2019 | 17.3% | 7.6% | 7.8% | 8.3% | 12.7% | 6.5% | 7.6% | 3.8% | 3.7% | 4.1% | 2.8% | 1.7% | 15.9% | 0.3% | 1.4% |
| Ipsos | 21 Mar 2019 | 17.1% | 12.7% | 9.2% | 8.3% | 9.7% | 7.0% | 6.0% | 4.5% | 4.6% | 4.5% | 2.2% | 2.2% | 11.4% | 0.8% | 4.4% |
| States-Provincial election | 20 Mar 2019 | 14.0% | 6.9% | 11.1% | 7.8% | 10.8% | 5.9% | 8.5% | 5.0% | 4.4% | 3.6% | 2.6% | 1.7% | 14.5% | 3.2% | 0.5% |
| I&O Research | 18 Mar 2019 | 15.2% | 9.7% | 9.5% | 7.4% | 12.1% | 7.8% | 7.6% | 4.8% | 4.6% | 3.5% | 2.4% | 2.0% | 13.0% | 0.6% | 2.2% |
| I&O Research | 12 Mar 2019 | 15.8% | 10.0% | 9.6% | 7.1% | 12.0% | 9.6% | 6.8% | 5.5% | 3.6% | 3.8% | 2.1% | 2.3% | 11.5% | 0.4% | 3.8% |
| I&O Research | 26 Feb 2019 | 15.3% | 11.1% | 7.9% | 7.4% | 13.3% | 9.1% | 6.5% | 4.7% | 4.6% | 4.0% | 2.7% | 2.2% | 10.5% | 0.6% | 2.0% |
| Ipsos | 24 Feb 2019 | 18.4% | 12.4% | 8.6% | 9.2% | 10.6% | 7.4% | 6.1% | 4.2% | 4.1% | 4.1% | 2.5% | 2.1% | 9.9% | 0.3% | 6.0% |
| Ipsos | 28 Jan 2019 | 17.5% | 13.1% | 9.1% | 8.5% | 11.4% | 8.2% | 5.7% | 4.7% | 4.9% | 3.6% | 2.4% | 2.2% | 7.8% | 0.9% | 4.4% |
| I&O Research | 22 Jan 2019 | 16.3% | 11.8% | 9.6% | 7.2% | 12.0% | 8.6% | 7.5% | 4.8% | 4.2% | 3.1% | 2.7% | 1.4% | 10.4% | 0.3% | 4.3% |
| Ipsos | 17 Dec 2018 | 18.6% | 12.5% | 9.6% | 9.4% | 10.6% | 7.6% | 5.8% | 4.4% | 5.5% | 3.7% | 2.5% | 1.9% | 6.9% | 1.0% | 6.1% |
| I&O Research | 27 Nov 2018 | 17.1% | 11.8% | 9.5% | 8.2% | 12.5% | 9.6% | 6.4% | 4.3% | 3.8% | 3.0% | 2.7% | 2.4% | 8.0% | 0.5% | 4.6% |
| Ipsos | 26 Nov 2018 | 18.7% | 13.5% | 9.6% | 8.2% | 10.8% | 8.2% | 6.4% | 4.3% | 4.7% | 3.6% | 2.5% | 2.1% | 6.6% | 0.8% | 5.2% |
| Ipsos | 29 Oct 2018 | 20.1% | 14.2% | 10.0% | 8.2% | 10.4% | 7.0% | 6.8% | 4.4% | 3.9% | 4.4% | 1.9% | 1.7% | 6.3% | 0.7% | 5.9% |
| Ipsos | 23 Sep 2018 | 20.1% | 13.1% | 10.1% | 8.4% | 10.8% | 8.1% | 5.4% | 4.1% | 5.3% | 3.7% | 2.4% | 1.8% | 6.3% | 0.4% | 7.0% |
| I&O Research | 11 Sep 2018 | 17.1% | 9.7% | 9.6% | 8.9% | 12.7% | 8.9% | 7.4% | 4.9% | 4.4% | 3.4% | 2.7% | 2.2% | 8.0% | 0.4% | 4.4% |
| Ipsos | 3 Sep 2018 | 20.3% | 11.9% | 11.2% | 8.7% | 10.2% | 9.3% | 5.4% | 4.3% | 4.7% | 3.7% | 2.1% | 1.8% | 5.7% | 0.6% | 8.4% |
| Ipsos | 30 Jul 2018 | 21.5% | 12.0% | 10.2% | 8.9% | 10.0% | 7.6% | 4.9% | 4.3% | 5.1% | 4.1% | 2.3% | 2.3% | 6.2% | 0.6% | 9.5% |
| I&O Research | 29 Jun 2018 | 17.5% | 10.3% | 10.8% | 9.1% | 12.7% | 7.6% | 7.0% | 4.7% | 4.4% | 4.0% | 2.3% | 2.3% | 7.1% | 0.1% | 4.8% |
| Ipsos | 25 Jun 2018 | 20.4% | 11.4% | 10.8% | 9.9% | 10.7% | 7.4% | 5.1% | 4.2% | 4.7% | 3.7% | 2.0% | 3.1% | 6.0% | 0.6% | 9.0% |
| Ipsos | 28 May 2018 | 20.5% | 10.5% | 11.0% | 10.0% | 11.7% | 7.2% | 5.3% | 4.4% | 4.5% | 3.4% | 2.0% | 2.3% | 6.4% | 0.8% | 8.8% |
| Ipsos | 23 Apr 2018 | 21.7% | 9.4% | 9.7% | 9.4% | 11.6% | 8.2% | 5.2% | 4.7% | 4.5% | 4.1% | 2.0% | 2.5% | 6.4% | 0.4% | 10.1% |
| Local elections | 20 Mar 2018 | 13.5% | 1.4% | 13.4% | 9.2% | 8.9% | 4.4% | 7.5% | 3.8% | 1.2% | 0.8% | 1.9% | 1.0% | 0.3% | 28.7% | 15.2% |
| Ipsos | 19 Mar 2018 | 20.9% | 10.4% | 10.2% | 10.5% | 9.5% | 8.5% | 5.1% | 4.3% | 4.5% | 4.6% | 2.2% | 2.5% | 5.9% | 0.8% | 10.4% |
| I&O Research | 12 Mar 2018 | 17.7% | 10.5% | 10.5% | 10.2% | 10.7% | 8.4% | 7.6% | 5.0% | 3.6% | 4.2% | 2.3% | 2.0% | 6.8% | 0.5% | 7.0% |
| Ipsos | 26 Feb 2018 | 19.9% | 9.7% | 10.1% | 10.4% | 9.3% | 8.3% | 5.1% | 3.6% | 5.2% | 4.0% | 2.3% | 3.1% | 7.7% | 1.3% | 9.5% |
| I&O Research | 6 Feb 2018 | 18.9% | 10.6% | 9.4% | 11.3% | 10.7% | 7.9% | 6.7% | 4.3% | 4.1% | 3.2% | 2.4% | 1.6% | 8.6% | 0.5% | 7.6% |
| Ipsos | 29 Jan 2018 | 20.2% | 10.6% | 10.1% | 10.2% | 9.1% | 8.7% | 5.8% | 3.7% | 4.5% | 3.4% | 2.2% | 3.1% | 7.9% | 0.5% | 9.6% |
| Ipsos | 18 Dec 2017 | 19.8% | 11.8% | 9.4% | 10.7% | 8.7% | 8.0% | 6.6% | 3.9% | 4.4% | 3.2% | 2.5% | 2.6% | 7.8% | 0.6% | 8.0% |
| Ipsos | 30 Nov 2017 | 20.3% | 12.4% | 9.4% | 11.6% | 9.6% | 6.3% | 6.8% | 3.9% | 4.0% | 3.6% | 2.1% | 2.0% | 7.5% | 0.5% | 7.9% |
| Ipsos | 2 Nov 2017 | 20.3% | 12.2% | 9.8% | 11.7% | 10.0% | 6.2% | 5.6% | 4.1% | 3.8% | 4.0% | 1.9% | 3.1% | 6.3% | 1.0% | 8.1% |
| I&O Research | 30 Oct 2017 | 19.2% | 11.9% | 9.5% | 11.7% | 10.3% | 7.1% | 6.9% | 4.4% | 3.5% | 3.4% | 2.5% | 1.6% | 7.4% | 0.5% | 7.3% |
| I&O Research | 11 Oct 2017 | 19.3% | 12.3% | 9.6% | 12.0% | 10.5% | 6.6% | 6.4% | 4.4% | 3.9% | 4.1% | 2.2% | 1.6% | 6.6% | 0.5% | 7.0% |
| Ipsos | 5 Oct 2017 | 21.9% | 11.4% | 9.7% | 12.9% | 9.4% | 6.2% | 4.9% | 3.6% | 4.7% | 3.3% | 1.7% | 3.1% | 6.2% | 1.0% | 9.0% |
| Ipsos | 14 Sep 2017 | 22.7% | 12.1% | 10.3% | 12.4% | 8.5% | 5.8% | 5.1% | 4.0% | 4.3% | 3.3% | 2.1% | 2.4% | 5.6% | 1.4% | 10.3% |
| I&O Research | 11 Sep 2017 | 19.5% | 12.8% | 10.4% | 12.0% | 9.7% | 7.9% | 6.0% | 4.3% | 4.1% | 2.8% | 2.2% | 1.8% | 5.9% | 0.7% (Note: PP with 0.4%, A1 with 0.3%, others with 0.0%) | 6.7% |
| Ipsos | 10 Aug 2017 | 22.2% | 13.7% | 10.0% | 13.1% | 8.4% | 5.7% | 4.9% | 4.2% | 4.9% | 2.4% | 1.4% | 3.1% | 4.8% | 1.2% | 8.5% |
| Ipsos | 13 Jul 2017 | 22.7% | 12.6% | 10.6% | 13.4% | 9.0% | 5.8% | 5.5% | 4.3% | 4.4% | 2.7% | 1.6% | 3.1% | 3.5% | 0.8% | 9.3% |
| Ipsos | 29 Jun 2017 | 23.1% | 12.6% | 11.2% | 12.7% | 10.7% | 5.0% | 5.1% | 4.4% | 3.7% | 2.4% | 1.7% | 2.8% | 3.9% | 0.7% | 10.4% |
| I&O Research | 18 Jun 2017 | 20.4% | 15.2% | 10.5% | 12.6% | 9.7% | 8.0% | 6.5% | 3.9% | 3.3% | 2.6% | 2.2% | 1.7% | 3.1% | 0.5% (Note: PP and A1 with 0.2%, others with 0.1%) | 5.2% |
| Ipsos | 15 Jun 2017 | 23.7% | 12.2% | 11.4% | 13.2% | 9.3% | 6.1% | 6.0% | 4.2% | 3.3% | 2.4% | 1.5% | 2.2% | 3.1% | 1.4% | 10.5% |
| Ipsos | 1 Jun 2017 | 24.0% | 12.1% | 11.4% | 12.8% | 10.1% | 5.7% | 4.5% | 4.3% | 3.7% | 2.6% | 1.8% | 2.5% | 3.4% | 1.1% | 11.2% |
| Ipsos | 19 May 2017 | 23.6% | 12.9% | 10.7% | 13.9% | 9.2% | 5.7% | 4.9% | 3.9% | 3.3% | 2.1% | 1.9% | 3.0% | 3.7% | 1.2% | 9.7% |
| Ipsos | 4 May 2017 | 23.9% | 13.5% | 10.9% | 13.3% | 9.8% | 5.5% | 4.7% | 4.1% | 3.6% | 2.2% | 2.3% | 1.9% | 3.1% | 1.2% | 10.4% |
| Ipsos | 20 Apr 2017 | 24.3% | 12.4% | 11.2% | 12.6% | 10.6% | 5.8% | 4.1% | 3.3% | 4.1% | 2.4% | 2.3% | 2.2% | 3.5% | 1.2% | 11.7% |
| Ipsos | 6 Apr 2017 | 22.0% | 13.1% | 11.9% | 13.1% | 9.4% | 7.5% | 5.1% | 3.6% | 3.6% | 2.9% | 2.3% | 2.2% | 2.2% | 1.1% | 8.9% |
| 2017 election | 15 Mar 2017 | 21.3% | 13.1% | 12.4% | 12.2% | 9.1% | 9.1% | 5.7% | 3.4% | 3.2% | 3.1% | 2.1% | 2.1% | 1.8% | 1.5% (Note: VNL with 0.4%, PP and A1 with 0.3%, others with 0.6%) | 8.2% |

== See also ==
- Opinion polling for the 2017 Dutch general election
- Opinion polling for the 2023 Dutch general election
