= Marengo trial =

Dutch trial

- Court: Amsterdam District Court
- Decided: 27 February 2024 (first instance)

The Marengo trial (Dutch: Marengo-proces) is a legal proceeding involving high-ranking members of the Mocro Maffia, a Dutch-Moroccan criminal organisation. The trial centers on seventeen defendants accused of participating in five murders and four attempted murders.

On 27 February 2024, the trial concluded after six years of proceedings. Among the seventeen individuals prosecuted, three were sentenced to life imprisonment, including Ridouan Taghi and Saïd Razzouki, who were convicted for their roles in ten murders. In April 2024, the appeal began.

The trial has been described as the "most sick and poisoned ever". A brother, a lawyer (Derk Wiersum) and a confidant (Peter R. de Vries) of the crown witness were killed in retaliation. Three lawyers of Taghi were arrested for conveying messages to his criminal organisation.

== Background ==
=== Investigations ===
Between 2015 and 2017 five murders and four attempted murders took place that the police and Public Prosecution Service (OM) believed were linked to the criminal organization run by Ridouan Taghi, beginning the Marengo trial against all those suspected of involvement. All the murders followed a pattern, the victims having posed a threat to Taghi's organization which was involved in trafficking and dealing in cocaine and other drugs.

The trial was divided into multiple investigations.

==== Criminal organization ====
This investigation pertains to participation in a criminal organization during the period from 1 July 2015 to 14 January 2017.

==== Murder of Ronald Bakker ====
Bakker was murdered because he allegedly provided the police with information about customers of the store in Nieuwegein where he worked. In a separate case, two 'spotters' were also convicted for this murder. They also made preparations for an explosion in the spy shop in Nieuwegein, where Bakker was employed. Taghi suspected the company of collaborating with the police and judiciary. This was evident from messages intercepted by the police via PGP phones between Taghi and co-defendants, which could only be cracked years later.

==== Murder of Samir Erraghib ====
In April 2016, Samir Erraghib was murdered in his car in front of his house in IJsselstein, while his seven year old daughter sat next to him. According to intercepted messages, Taghi believed Erraghib had passed information about his organization to the police and had order the murder. In a separate case, two suspects including the shooter were sentenced to 22 years in prison.

==== Murder of Abderrahim Belhadj ====
On 9 May 2016, Abderrahim 'Appie' Belhadj was murdered in the Bijlmermeer, Amsterdam. According to the prosecution, Taghi ordered the liquidation of Abderrahim Belhadj because Belhadj allegedly stole two blocks of cocaine. Belhadj's murderer has not been found. The person who lured Belhadj into the trap received an 18-year prison sentence in a separate case on appeal.

==== Murder of the El Margai brothers ====
This investigation pertained to the preparation of the murder of the El Margai brothers, Buzhu, and Scekic, and the murder of the latter. Scekic was murdered just before he was due to testify in a criminal case against Taghi in Utrecht. He was allegedly part of a group preparing murders on behalf of Taghi.

==== Murder of Martin Kok ====
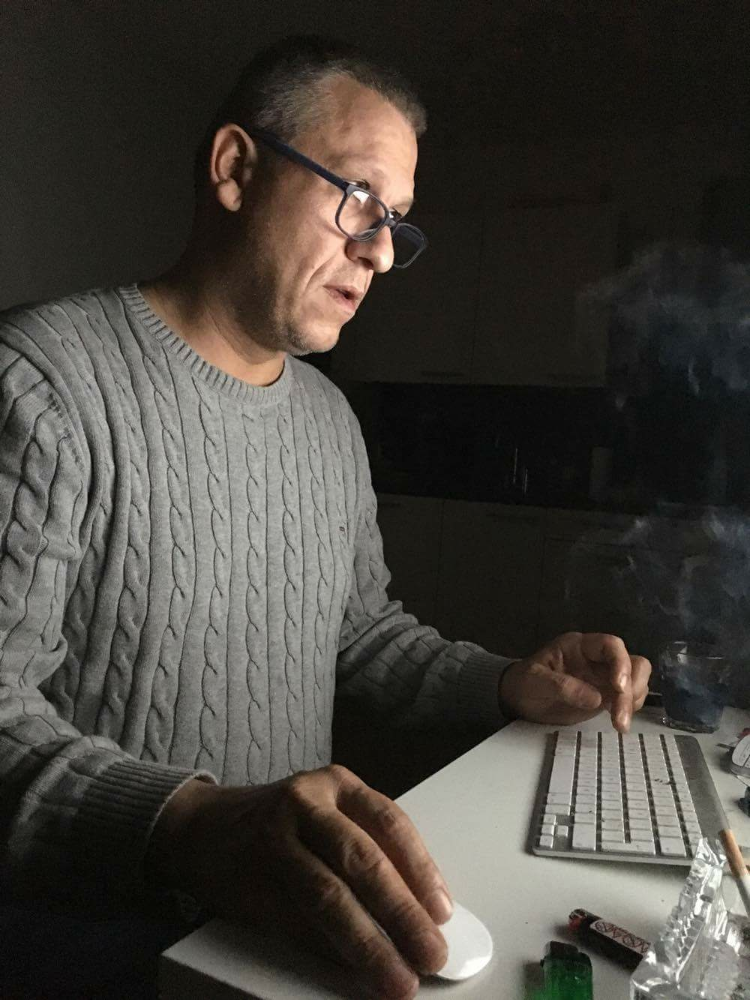
Martin Kok

In June 2016, ex-criminal and crime blogger Martin Kok published on his website Vlinderscrime about two of Taghi's accomplices. In July 2016, an attempt was made to eliminate Kok by placing a bomb under the car he was driving, but the explosive was discovered in time.

On 12 September 2016, Kok wrote on his website about Taghi, Richard R., and Naoufal F. On the afternoon of 8 December in Amsterdam-South, another attempt was made on Kok's life, but the shooter's weapon jammed, unbeknownst to Kok. That same evening, Kok was eventually murdered in Laren. For luring Kok into a trap, a Scottish man was convicted in a separate case.

==== Attempted murder of Abdelkarim Ahabad ====
On 11 October 2016, Abdelkarim Ahabad was the target of an assassination attempt. An assailant approached him with an automatic firearm, after which Ahabad was blocked by a vehicle. He managed to escape the attack unharmed.

==== Attempted murder of Khalil B. ====
In the night, Khalil B.'s house was broken into two or three men armed with automatic weapons. Khalil managed to escape through the window.

==== Murder of Hakim Changachi ====
According to the prosecution, Changachi was not the intended target of the murder, but rather Khalid Hmidat. Four other involved suspects, including the two shooters, were convicted in a separate case. A fifth, Justin Jap Tjong, was also involved according to the prosecution, but was murdered for refusing to assist in the second murder attempt on the original target.

==== Attempted murder of Khalid Hmidat ====
Khalid Hmidat was the intended target when Changachi was killed. A few days later, a new murder attempt followed, but Hmidat noticed his pursuers in time and alerted the police.

=== Crown witness ===
A significant source for the Public Prosecution Service was the crown witness Nabil B. He was part of Taghi's organization and had arranged getaway cars for the mistaken murder of Hakim Changachi on 12 January 2017. Fearing retaliation from Changachi's family, Nabil B.—after consulting with lawyers—allowed himself to be apprehended on 14 January 2017, after tipping off the police that he was armed near Leidseplein and P.C. Hooftstraat. (Note: He was sentenced to seven months in prison for this weapon possession in September 2018.) In this way, he hoped to strike a deal with the authorities.

On 29 June 2021, lawyers of one of the suspects released messages from the crown witness to his girlfriend. This would indicate that the crown witness was after money from the deal. A day later, the lawyer of the crown witness stated that those messages stemmed from anger over the inadequate security provided to the crown witness.

==== Liquidations around crown witness ====
In messages the police intercepted, Taghi said he would make his entire family 'sleep'. A week after it became known that he had decided to cooperate with the authorities, his brother Reduan was lured into a trap and murdered in March 2018. Family members of Nabil B. had previously warned that the disclosure would pose dangers to the family. (Note: The perpetrator of the murder, Shurandy S., was sentenced to 28 years in prison in a separate appeal case. He did not say who hired him and he claimed to be unaware that his victim was the brother of a crown witness. The public prosecution believed this to be true, and although they had no evidence linking the killing to Taghi they believed it was likely done to scare off any other potential witnesses.)

Additionally, on 18 September 2019, his lawyer, Derk Wiersum, was murdered in front of his home in Amsterdam. (Note: The two perpetrators were sentenced to 30 years in prison in a separate appeal case.)

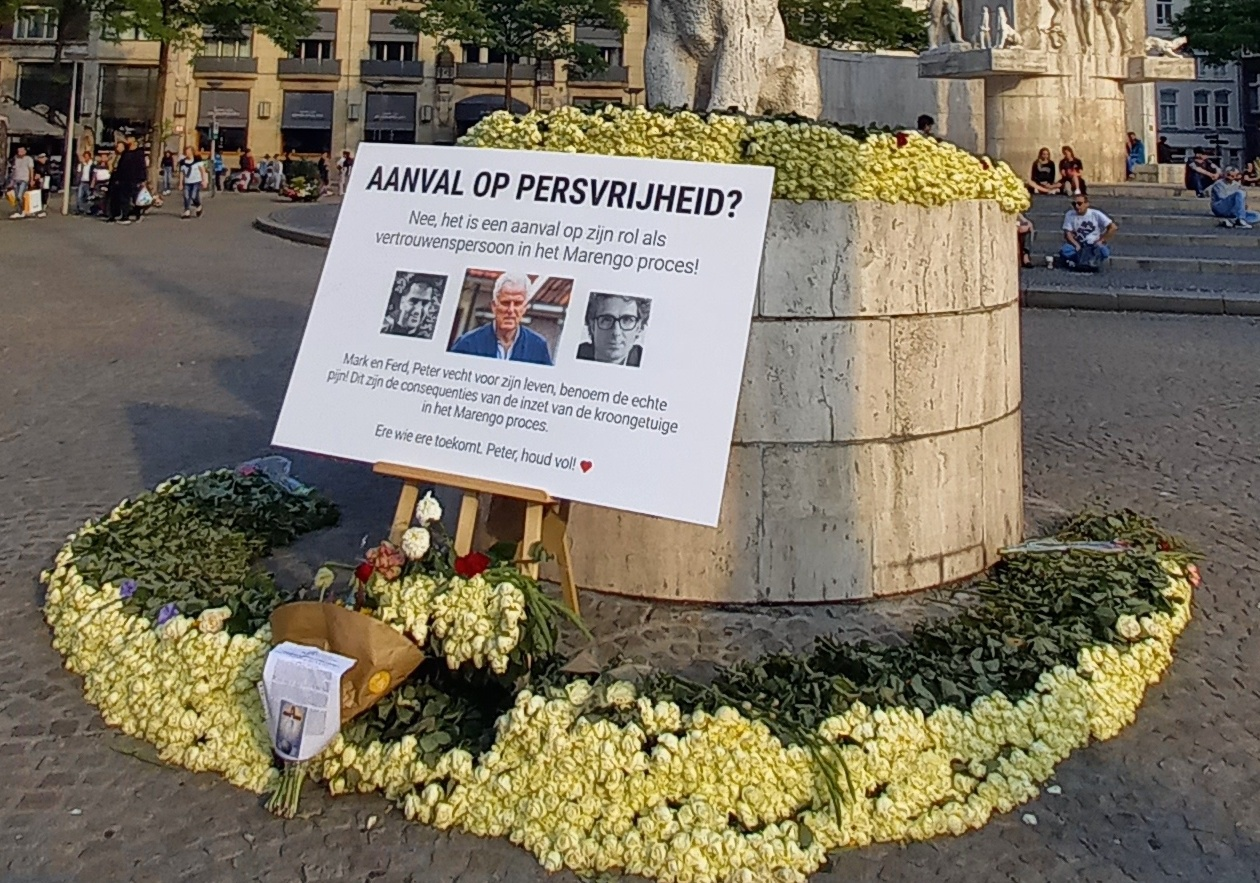
Flowers at Dam Square, Amsterdam after the Killing of Peter R. de Vries. The text reads "Attack on the freedom of press? No, an attack on his involvement with the Marengo trial!"

The investigative journalist and crime reporter Peter R. de Vries was supporting the crown witness in the trial. On 6 July 2021, he was shot in the head after leaving the television studio of RTL Boulevard in Amsterdam where he had appeared as a guest. He was taken to a hospital in critical condition. On 15 July he died as a result of the injury sustained in the shooting.

== Trial ==
The name Marengo was chosen randomly by a computer to give the case a neutral name. It is the name of a textile, which is derived from Napoleon's Marengo campaign in Italy.

=== First instance ===
==== Procedurial sessions ====
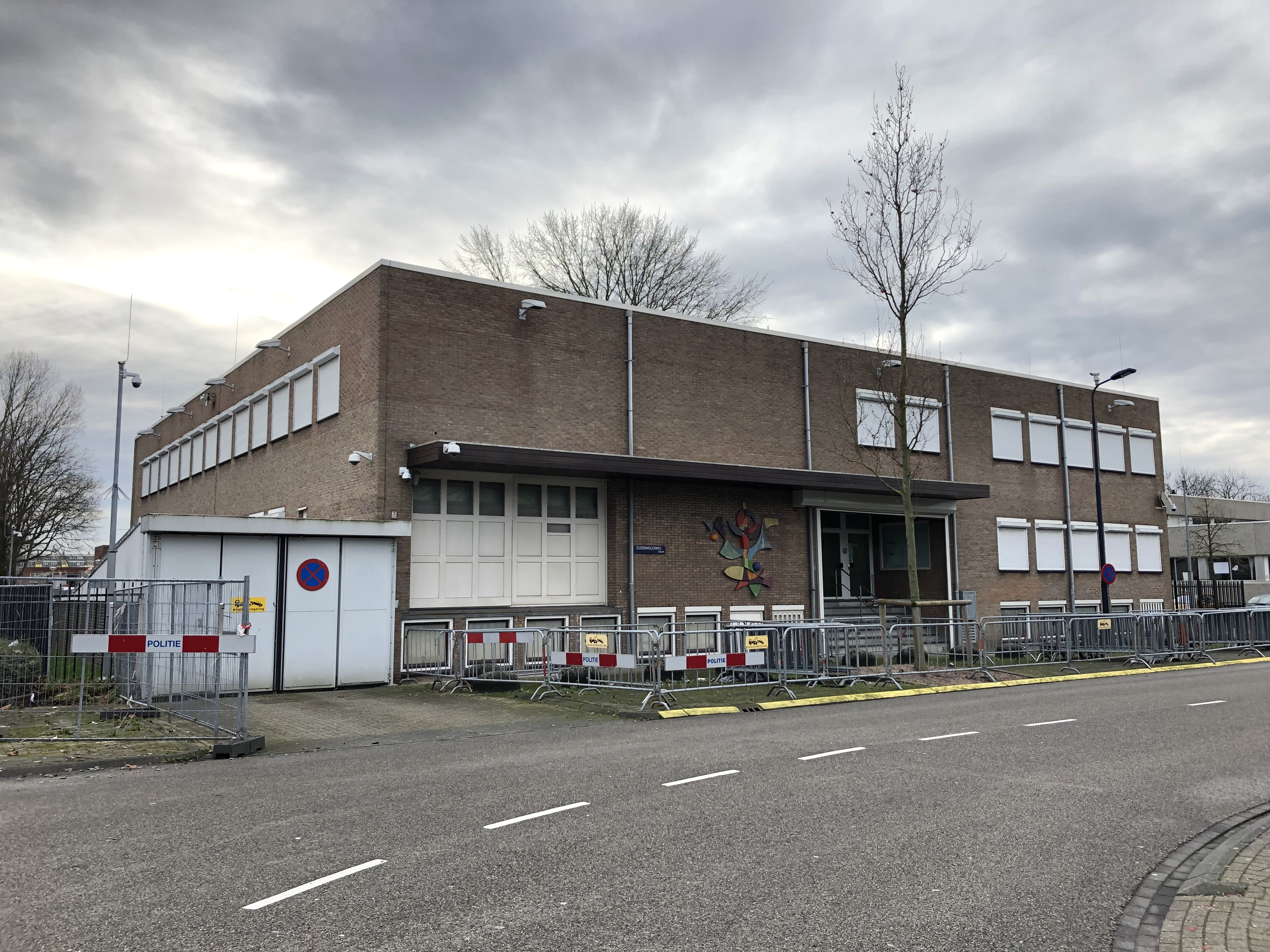
The heavily secured De Bunker in Amsterdam Nieuw-West where the trial took place

The first procedurial court session (Dutch: Pro-formazitting) took place on 23 March 2018.

On 31 May 2019, lawyers for three suspects filed complaints against the Public Prosecution Service and the police. According to the lawyers, they had leaked documents to Het Parool.

A few days after the murder of the key witness's lawyer on 18 September 2019, it was decided to continue the criminal trial behind closed doors for security reasons.

On 17 October 2019, Inez Weski announced that she would step down as Taghi's lawyer. She believed there was no fair trial because she was not allowed to conduct sufficient investigation. In December 2019, Taghi was arrested in Dubai and transferred to Vught. Weski resumed the defense.

An investigating judge who had been involved in the case since July 2019 withdrew in October 2020. According to her, she was treated unacceptably by the lawyers.

==== Substantive sessions ====
The substantive court sessions began on 22 March 2021.

On 11 June 2021, the lawyers of Nabil B. requested substitution of the judges in the trial for bias. This request was denied a week later.

Youssef Taghi, cousin and media lawyer of Ridouan Taghi, was arrested in October 2021 because Ridouan Taghi communicated with the outside world through him and, among other things, made preparations for a violent escape attempt.

On 29 March 2022, the lawyers of Mohamed Razzouki ceased active defense. They disagreed with not being allowed to hear the partner of the crown witness.

On 20 April 2023, Weski responded for the last time in the trial on behalf of her clients Taghi, Mao, and Mario R. A day later, she was arrested on suspicion of participating in a criminal organization. Taghi is said to have used her to communicate with the outside world. She then ceased the defense of Taghi. Michael Ruperti, Sjoerd van Berge Henegouwen, and Arthur van Biezen took over the defense not much later. However, after six months, they ceased the defense again because the court did not grant their request to postpone the trial for nine months so that they could familiarize themselves with the case. As a result, Taghi had no lawyer for the remaining part of the trial.

On 27 February 2024, the court rendered its judgment in the case.

=== Second instance ===
In April 2025, one of Taghi's new lawyers, Vito Shukrula, was arrested on suspicion of participating in Taghi's criminal organization.

== Suspects, charges and verdicts ==
Name	Requested sentence	Verdict	Lawyers
Ridouan Taghi	Life imprisonment	Life imprisonment	Inez Weski (-2023); Susanne Boersma (-2023); Laura Versluis (-2023); Michael Ruperti (2023); Arthur van der Biezen (2023); Sjoerd van Berge Henegouwen (2023); Vito Shukrula (2024-2025); Carlo Crince le Roy (2024-2025); Sultan Kat (2025)
Saïd Razzouki	Life imprisonment	Life imprisonment	Christian Flokstra (-2021); Nico Meijering (-2021); Robert van ’t Land; Mark Dunsbergen
Mohamed Razzouki	Life imprisonment	27 years	Christian Flokstra; Nico Meijering
Zaki Razzouki	14 years	5 years, 8 months	Yassine Bouchikhi
Zakaria A.	25 years, 8 months	9 years, 6 months	Jan-Hein Kuijpers
Charif el A.	16 years	3 years, 8 months	Peter Plasman
Mohammed el Aissaoui	26 years, 5 months	13 years, 7 months	Marcel Heuvelmans
Zakaria el H.	26 years, 8 months	23 years, 4 months	Jurriaan de Vries
Bagdad el H.	16 years	8 years, 7 months	Ruud van Boom
Richard O.	5 years, 11 months	1 years, 9 months	Max den Blanken
Achraf B.	Life imprisonment	29 years, 2 months	Guy Weski; Anna Segers (2024-2025)
Mohamed M.	16 years	5 years, 6 months	Christian Flokstra
Arthur M.	23 years, 8 months	19 years, 3 months	Shirley Sprinter
Mao R.	Life imprisonment	15 years, 8 months	Inez Weski; Susanne Boersma
Mario R.	Life imprisonment	Life imprisonment	Inez Weski; Susanne Boersma
Walid M.	20 years	15 years, 2 months	C. van Oort
Nabil B. (Crown witness)	10 years	10 years	Bart Stapert (-2018); Derk Wiersum (-2019) unknown (2018-2019); Oscar Hammerstein (Note: Following complaints from, among others, De Vries, Hammersteins license was revoked in December 2021 due to his actions in the process.) (2019-2020); Peter Schouten (2020-2023, 2024); Onno de Jong (2020-2023, 2023-2024)
