= Moroccan mafia =

Criminal organisations of people of Moroccan descent

- Founded: Late 1980s
- Territory: Mostly active in Netherlands and Belgium. Presence also in Morocco, Spain, Italy, France, United Kingdom, Germany, Romania, United Arab Emirates, Colombia, Brazil, Dominican Republic, Panama and Suriname.
- Ethnicity: Moroccan
- Membership: >20 known clans and families
- Activities: Drug trafficking, money laundering, tax evasion, sex trafficking, extortion, racketeering, political corruption, murder, contract killing, terrorism, kidnapping, prostitution, torture, arms trafficking, property crime, robbery, motor vehicle theft, arson
- Allies: Galician clans Penose 'Ndrangheta; Camorra; Kinahan Cartel; Iranian secret service Tito and Dino Cartel; Clan del Golfo; Sinaloa cartel Oficina de Envigado
- Notable members: Ridouan Taghi

The Moroccan mafia (Arabic: موكرو مافيا, Berber languages: ⵎⴰⴼⵢⴰ ⵉⵎⵖⵔⵉⴱⵉⵢⵏ, Dutch: Mocro Maffia) is a collection of criminal organisations that are primarily made up of people of Moroccan descent. These organisations are specialised in trafficking large quantities of cocaine and synthetic drugs through Spain, Portugal, the Netherlands and Belgium, from where it is distributed to the rest of the European continent, thus being one of the most dominant participants in the European drug trade.

In broader terms of Moroccan organised crime, this also includes northern Moroccan hash kingpins and southern Moroccan traffickers who play a key-role in the African drug trade, as well as in human trafficking, arms trafficking and the trafficking of contraband such as cigarettes and alcohol, although they are seen as a separate entity from the Mocro Maffia who are mostly active in the northern part of Morocco and Europe.

Moroccan criminal networks in Europe have mainly been active since the 1990s, and consist mostly of Belgian and Dutch citizens with a Moroccan immigrant background. These criminal networks have privileged relationships with Colombian and Mexican cartels, and they often import drugs into Europe through the harbours of Antwerp, Rotterdam and Algeciras.

The Moroccan mafia does not, however, include Moroccan Jewish crime families such as the Abergil crime family as well as the Abutbul, and Domrani clans, who are rather considered to be a part of the Israeli mafia. That said, Moroccan-Israeli mafia clans are known for having collaborated closely together with the Mocro Maffia in the Netherlands and Belgium, especially in the worldwide distribution of synthetic drugs such as MDMA. This is mostly due to the fact that the Netherlands is the largest producer of MDMA and amphetamines in the world.

== Overview ==
=== Timeline of events ===
In 2012 a large shipment of cocaine was stolen by the Turtle clan in the Port of Antwerp. This eventually led to a gang war amongst multiple criminal organisations which the Dutch and Belgian media outlets described as the Mocro-War.

From this point on, many people from Dutch- and Belgian-Moroccan descent were killed in various shootings across Belgium, the Netherlands, Spain, Morocco, and Suriname. Ridouan Taghi became a prominent figure within the Moroccan mafia, who had a large share in the European cocaine trade, and he was also responsible for a lot of gangland killings across Europe. He is currently jailed in a maximum security prison in the Netherlands awaiting his trial. His right-hand man Saïd Razzouki was arrested in Bogotá, Colombia, extradited to the Netherlands, and in February 2024 was sentenced to life imprisonment for his role in ten murders.

In Antwerp, the term Borgerokko-Maffia is often used due to the large impact of the illegal economy in the district of Borgerhout. The trade of this illegal economy has its origins in the Moroccan street gangs of Antwerp and Amsterdam, which is described in the 2014 published book Borgerokko Maffia by Raf Sauviller, and also in the book Mocro Maffia by criminologist Martijn Schrijver.

The Moroccan mafia has appeared in most of the large Belgian and Dutch cities including Antwerp, Brussels, Amsterdam, Rotterdam, Utrecht and Almere. In the mid-2010s, criminal organisations were also established in southern Spain (mainly around the Costa del Sol region), but also in the rest of Europe, South America, and more recently in the United Arab Emirates. According to the Dutch investigator Pieter Tops, the Moroccan mafia gains a revenue of around €20 billion a year in the Netherlands alone (as of 2018).

In September 2019, the Dutch politician Geert Wilders was trying to convince the Dutch government to launch an attack on drug traffickers. He also pleaded for a black list of the most dangerous criminal organisations that were operating on Dutch soil. This statement came right after the beheading of Nabil Amzieb, the attacks on the headquarters of Dutch news outlets De Telegraaf and Panorama, and the murders on journalist Martin Kok and lawyer Derk Wiersum,

On 6 July 2021, the Dutch crime journalist Peter R. de Vries was murdered, right after he left the studio of RTL Boulevard in Amsterdam, where he had appeared as a guest on the show. De Vries died more than a week later on 15 July 2021, as a result of the shooting. It is still unclear who gave the order of the shooting, but Dutch authorities suspect the organisation of Taghi. de Vries acted as a close confidant to Nabil B., a crown witness in the Marengo trial against the organisation of Taghi, whose brother, alongside his lawyer Derk Wiersum were assassinated on the orders of Taghi's organisation.

=== Etymology ===
- Mocro maffia: The name "Mocro maffia" is given by the Dutch-speaking authorities in the Netherlands and Belgium, who refer to Moroccan criminal organisations operating in the Benelux. The term was made public by author Martijn Schrijver in 2013, following the publication of his book Mocro Maffia, released in 2014. However, the term "Mocro" has existed since the 1990s, and is a Moroccan-Dutch slang term that describes someone with a Moroccan immigrant background, in both Belgium and the Netherlands. The term "Mocro Maffia" does not make a distinction between the various organisations that rival each other, but instead describes a network of all Moroccan criminal organisations that are active in the Benelux. Although the majority of members are of Moroccan descent, there are also some members who are from Dutch, Antillean, or Surinamese background.
- Mocro-oorlog or Mocro-War (Moroccan war): The name by which the media and journalists refer to the Mocro mafia conflict that began in 2012.
- Borgerokko Maffia: The name by which politicians, media outlets, and journalists refer to the Moroccan criminal networks that are active in Antwerp. The term was adopted by the Belgian writer Raf Sauviller in his book Borgerokko Maffia, which was released in 2017. The term quickly appeared on the front pages of Belgian newspapers.

=== Law enforcement operations ===
- Marengo trial: A Dutch federal criminal case focussed on dismantling the organisation of Ridouan Taghi. It is considered to be the biggest criminal case in Dutch history.
- Operation Sky: A major cyberpolice operation carried out by the Belgian and Dutch authorities aimed at dismantling the criminal organisations of The Turtles and the El Ballouti clan, who used encrypted messages within the Sky ECC communication network.
- Kali-team: A Belgian police unit in Antwerp which was established in 2018 to combat organised crime and drug trafficking in the port of Antwerp.

== Origins and context ==
=== History (1960–1995) ===
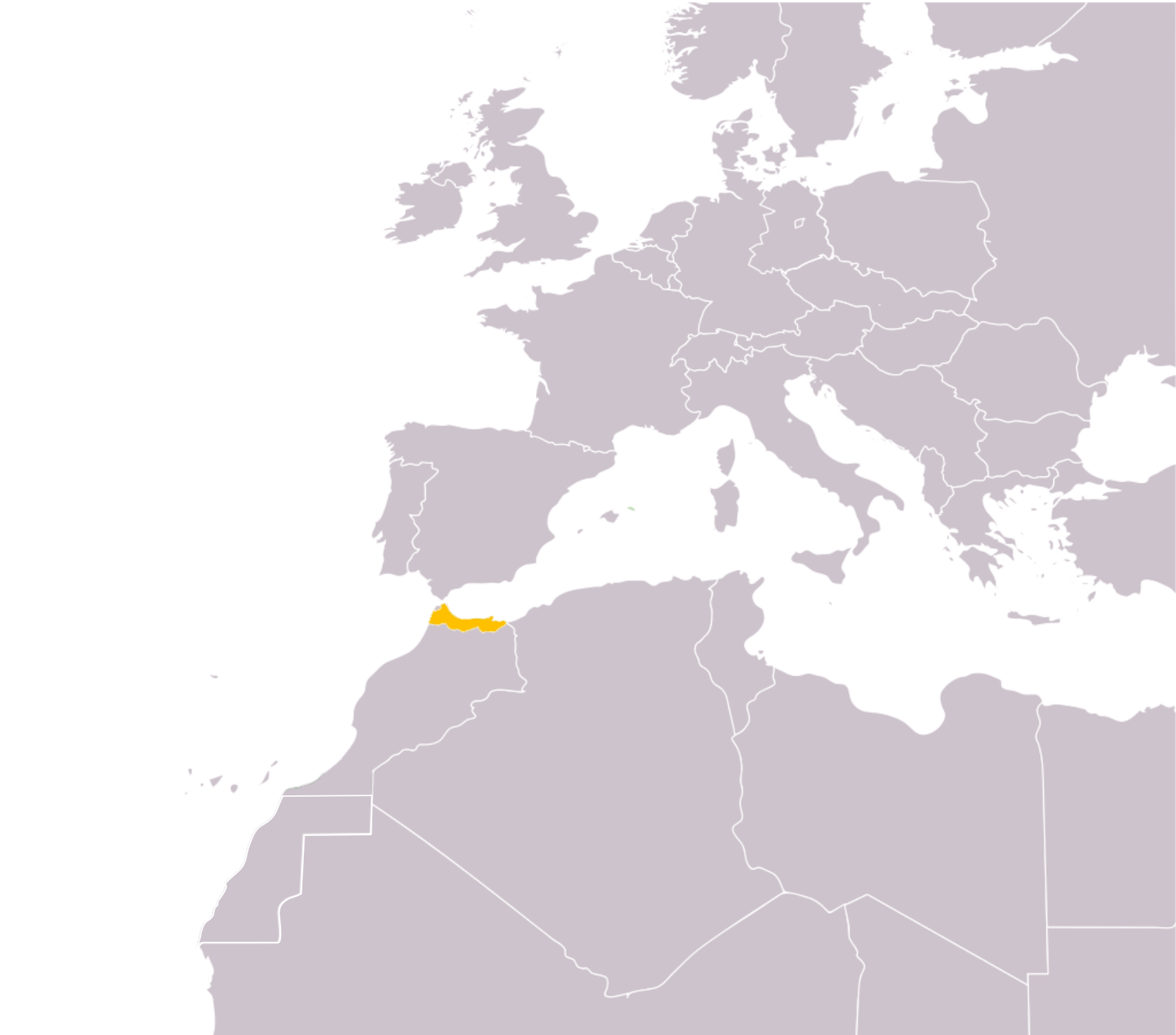
Location of the Rif (yellow), which is the largest cultivating place of hashish in the world.

Moroccans (mainly from the Rif region) have migrated in large waves to the Benelux, who were invited to these countries as guest workers. This dense and rather late emigration in the 1960s and 1970s eventually never stopped, and many of the invited guest workers decided to build a new life in the Benelux instead. Most of these Moroccan immigrants came from the Rif region, which is one of the poorest regions in all of Morocco. The Rif region was, and still is a very rural and little urbanised area, which had very few schools for an excessive time, whether in Arabic or French. This Mediterranean peasant and mountain society is quite comparable to other Mediterranean regions like Corsica, Sicily, Sardinia, Calabria and the Aurès. It is characterised by very strong community relationships, a spirit of silence (omertà) and self-governance. This mountainous region has always stayed somewhat uncontrollable. After decolonisation, more than tens of thousands of Riffians lost their jobs in the vineyards and farms of Morocco and Algeria. Afterward, this process continued, as if from the 1970s and onwards, many of these migrated Riffians have lost their jobs in the European mines and steel industry as well. Since then this workforce has converted on a massive scale into different ways of commerce and businesses, both legal and illegal, with the illegal side, in particular, being the smuggling of cannabis. The earned money was reinvested in cafes, small businesses and real estate in Morocco. The ones who gained some wealth, reinvested into the economy around the Costa del Sol region in southern Spain. The Riffian diaspora has thus spread its economic system throughout Europe. During the 1960s, Belgium and the Netherlands, unlike other countries in Western Europe, had no North African colonial past, welcomed massive Moroccan immigration from northern Morocco to work in the mines, iron and steel industry in Wallonia. Afterward, this process continued in Flanders, and the Netherlands, in the midst of an economic boom. The drug trade eventually followed these communities in exile, from Morocco to the Netherlands, through Spain, France, and Belgium.

During the 1980s, De Pijp and Bos en Lommer districts located in Amsterdam, housed the most Moroccan immigrants. During this period, many Dutch-Moroccans saw this as an opportunity to export hashish from the Ketama mountains in Morocco to the Netherlands, often aboard their old vehicles such as Mercedes-Benz S-Class cars. It was around this time in the mid-1980s that the modern mafia structures started to evolve. The traffickers were used to crossing borders, carrying weapons, and they were known in Morocco to be very violent. The Moroccan state has abandoned and neglected the Rif region for many years by refusing to invest in the infrastructure, which has prompted most Moroccans from cities like Al Hoceïma and Nador to devote themselves entirely to the production of Hashish. In the 1980s, cocaine gained a lot of popularity. These were also the years when Dutch Penose crime syndicates were inspiring the Moroccan community to enter the hard drug business, which would make them eventually more money than hashish.

=== Birth of international drug networks (1995–2006) ===
During the 1990s, many drug kingpins in South America preferred to operate their smuggling businesses through West African countries, like Ghana and Senegal, due to the absence of customs controls in the most important ports of these countries. Over time, South American cartels have created trafficking routes through North Africa for export to Europe. Morocco has an important strategic geographical placement and also a large diaspora in the most important countries of Europe, which is what eventually has set them apart from other countries on the African continent. While in Morocco the Rif mountains and port cities, like Tangier or Tétouan, were often counted on for the production and trafficking of drugs, in Europe, Antwerp became the European trafficking hub alongside Spain. With Antwerp and its Port, the whole of Belgium also became a geographic hub for drug export. Importation of goods and drug trafficking became inseparable over time, and these activities compensated for the layoffs that affected miners, steelworkers and textile workers on a massive scale. In this context, the old manners, habits, and the traditional codes of conduct, honor, justice, and distrust in authority were transplanted in the districts of Brussels, Amsterdam, and Antwerp, where these communities were able to grow significantly, notably with the establishment of a friendly relationship with the Dutch Penose, at that time amongst some of the largest criminal organisations in Europe. Whether justified or not, the Belgian and Dutch authorities characterised these communities by their "social isolation" and by a "more aggressively tribal culture" which distinguished them from other immigrant communities.

During the 1990s, the crime rates would increase in certain districts of Amsterdam. As a result of this, a large number of native Dutch people decided to leave these neighbourhoods to live somewhere else in the suburbs or the countryside, where it was usually a lot more calmer and serene. In 1995, a petition was set up in certain neighbourhoods to accommodate Moroccan immigrants outside of the city without success. Certain places like the Diamantbuurt in the district of De Pijp very rapidly gained a negative reputation due to the increase of criminality.

=== Moroccan cultural aspects ===
Northern Morocco has been the most neglected area in all of Morocco for an excessive time, which resulted in extreme marginalisation and poverty. Its traditional clan society has a culture of patronage and armed self-defence, combined with a sense of honour and heightened pride. As a result of this, individuals suspected of criminal activity could integrate very easily into the socio-economical aspect of this society. The functioning structures of the Moroccan mafia is through a family or clan. The clan structures are organised around members of the same family, or individuals from a common region. This also applies to individuals who were born on European soil. The drug trade in the mountainous Jbala area is in the hands of a few Moroccan families who operate like Corsican, Calabrian, or Sicilian Mafia organisations. They avoid public appearance and they live by a code of zwijgplicht. In other words, the omertà, or a code of honour and silence. These families live extremely reticent and communicate in a Berber language that Western Police forces do not master. Each organisation has a mega-structured hierarchy, including a right-hand man, warrant officers, logisticians, informants, lookouts, hitmen, corrupted police officers, and lawyers.

According to the United Nations Office on Drugs and Crime, Morocco produced 35.700 tonnes of cannabis in 2017. And in that same year, around 80% of all the hashish that is consumed in Europe originates in the mountainous Jbala region of northern Morocco. This rebellious region is considered to be a lawless area that is very difficult to access and deemed to be dangerous. For centuries, this area was a cultivating hub for hashish, which later on became the largest exporter of cannabis in the world. A strong taboo evolves around the topic of cannabis culture in Morocco, due to the fear of being killed by Moroccan families who practice the omertà to avoid being sentenced by the Moroccan state.

This criminal society is accustomed to money laundering, weapon trafficking, and finding hideouts from Gibraltar to Amsterdam, through major metropolitan areas, like Paris and Brussels. Later on, it also became clear that this was a contributing factor in nesting terrorist cells. Police forces in Europe, and more particularly that of Molenbeek-Saint-Jean, were aware of this but did not act on it to buy social peace with immigrant youths.

== Mocro mafia crime structure ==
=== Drug transport ===
South American cartels and Moroccan crime syndicates have maintained good relationships, and created trafficking networks to transport cargoes that involved thousands of containers through Moroccan ports since the 1980s. Due to the large waves of Moroccan immigration to the Netherlands and Belgium, beginning Moroccan traffickers were able to infiltrate the ports of Rotterdam and Antwerp, and criminal networks were eventually able to grow their influences over these port cities. In the 2000s, drug traffickers in these port-cities have changed the use of their hashish and cannabis routes for the use of cocaine trafficking to gain larger profits. A large part of these traffickers came from the north of Morocco, which explains their ease in expressing themselves in the Spanish language. With the arrival of new communication technologies, it was easier for these organisations to create and maintain new contacts, and networks were eventually established over three continents.

The Moroccan mafia in the Netherlands and Belgium dominate the European market for cocaine, cannabis and synthetic drugs, alongside the Irish Mob, and the Italian (’Ndrangheta and Camorra), Serbian, and Albanian mafia. Moroccan gangs in Amsterdam, Utrecht, and Rotterdam have a firm foothold in importing cocaine from South America, particularly from Peru and Colombia, where Colombian cartels trust Dutch- and Belgian-Moroccan drug traffickers in Antwerp to receive and distribute these drugs. About a 1000 kg of cocaine in South America that has a value of under a million euros, can easily bring up to €180 million when it arrives on the European mainland.

==== Port of Antwerp ====
Cocaine intercepted in the port of Antwerp
Year	Amount [tonnes]
2009	3.6
2010	5.5
2011	6.5
2012	17.5
2013	16
2014	19
2015	15.7
2016	31
2017	46
2018	50.1
2019	62
2020	65.5
2021	89.5
2022	110
2023	121

Cocaine is delivered daily in containers to the Port of Antwerp, before it is distributed throughout Europe by Dutch- and Belgian-Moroccan drug traffickers. The Port of Antwerp, which is considered to be the largest port for cocaine import in Europe, is dominated and controlled by 5 Moroccan drug clans who export these large quantities of cocaine to the European mainland. Gangs preferred to use the Port of Antwerp as a trafficking destination for drugs due to the lawlessness within the port. Additionally, with an area of 12,068 hectares (~24,000 football fields), the scale of the port is what makes it attractive to criminals. Within a single cargo ship, it is possible to place up to 15,000 containers. Customs officers use scanners, that are only able to scan a single container in 5 minutes, which makes full control over the entire cargo pretty much impossible. This makes drug trafficking easier for gangs operating in the port.

What also attracted the gangs, is the fact that the Port of Antwerp is considered to be an "open port". This is not the case for the Port of Rotterdam, which is closed off daily and under high surveillance. Bart De Wever, at the time mayor of Antwerp (since 2025 Prime Minister of Belgium), declared in 2017 that dozens of surveillance cameras are destroyed daily by young people between the age of 13 and 15 from neighbourhoods in Antwerp. They receive in exchange a sum of up to €5,000 from traffickers to prevent the police from investigating the drug trade that takes place in these neighbourhoods.

You have to be careful, a lot of young people go to the port to see how everything works. You have to know the exits by heart in case you get chased by enemies or overseers.

— Douglas de Conink, contributing editor at De Morgen

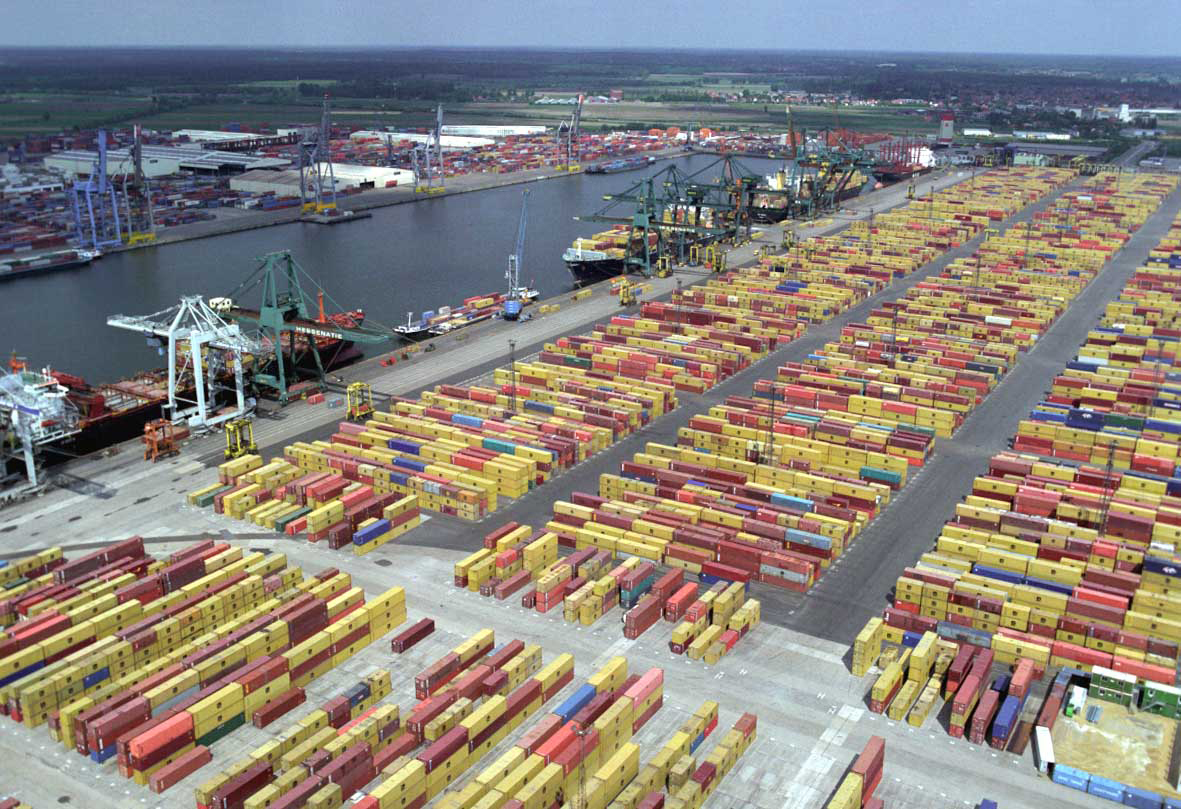
Aerial view on the Port of Antwerp

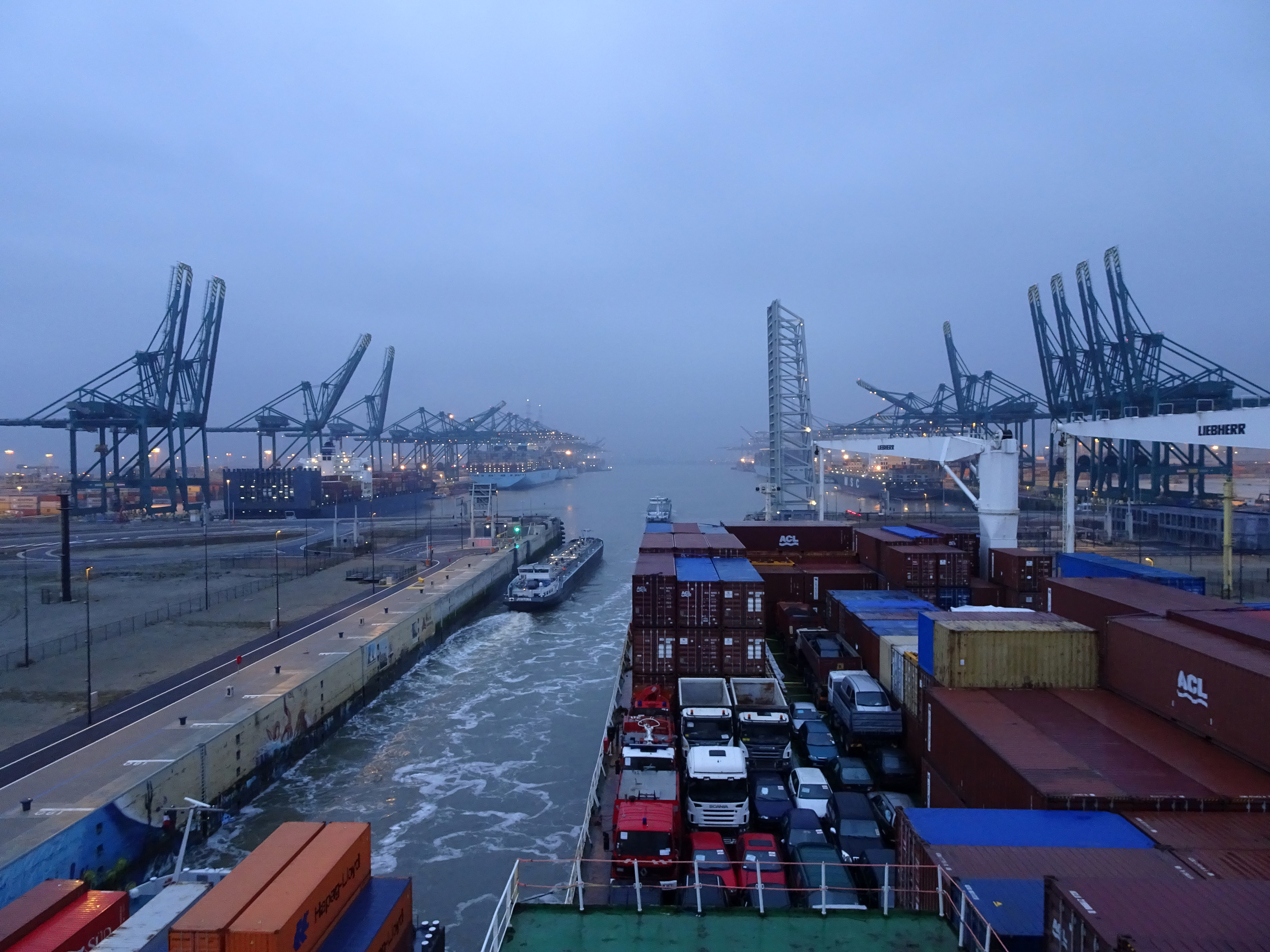
Passage of a lock at the port of Antwerp, seen from the deck of a container ship.

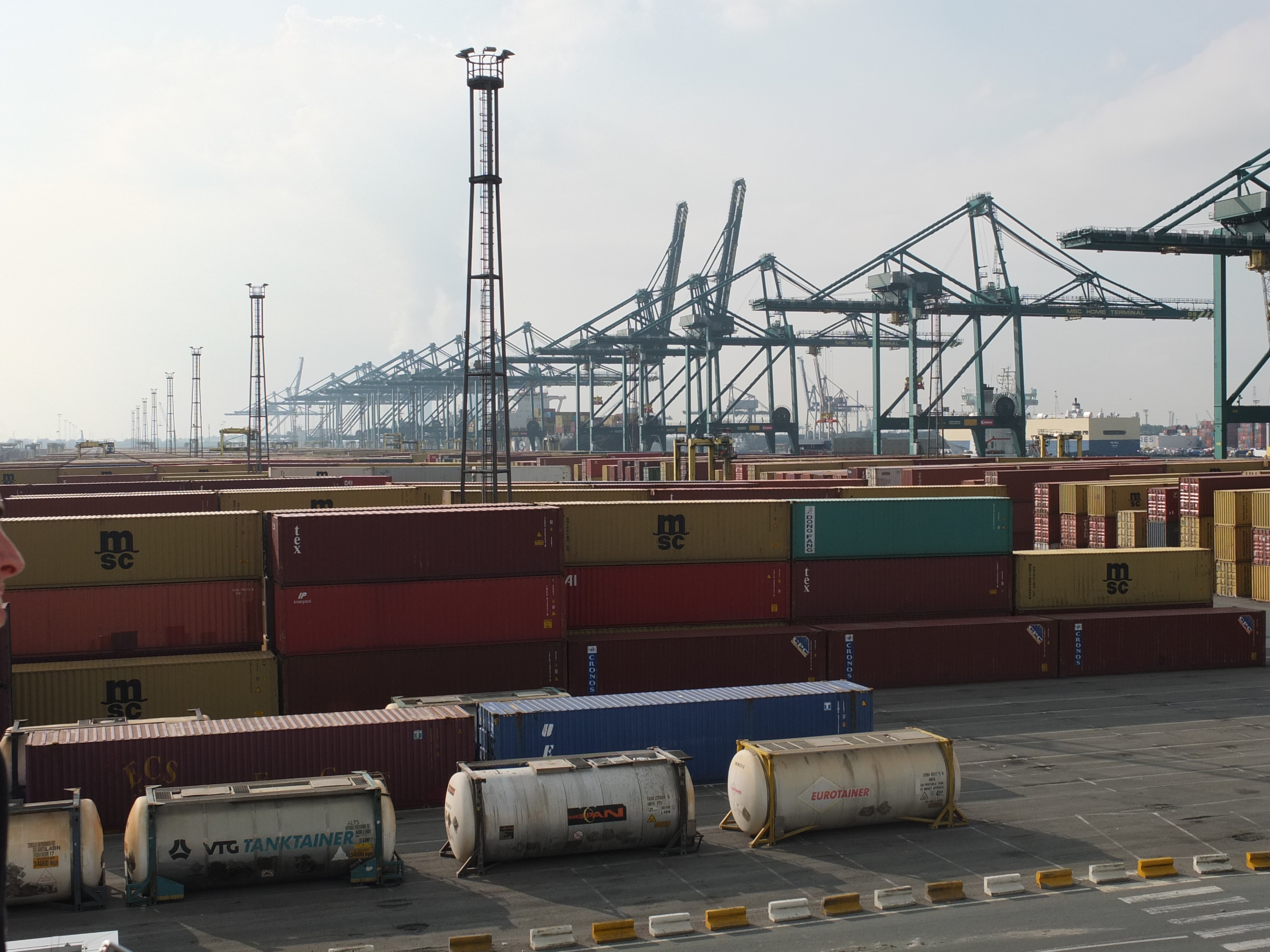
Dockers area, one of the main places for drug traffickers.

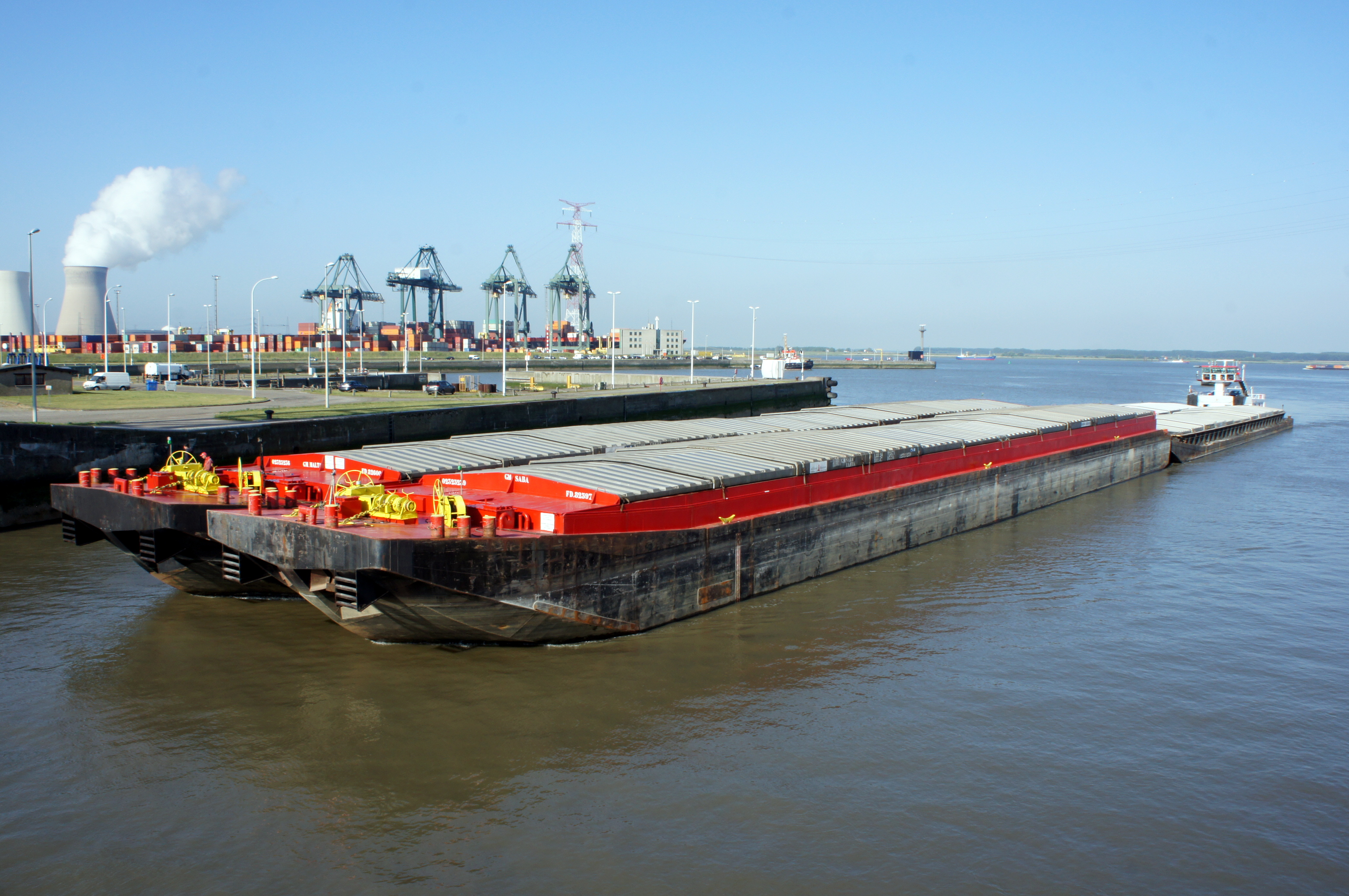
Zandvlietsluis area.

==== Corruption ====
There are also cases of corruption amongst customs officers who work for criminal gangs. The amount of corruption amongst customs officers has more than doubled between 2015 and 2017. In October 2017, Tim Deelen, who worked as a customs officer at the Port of Antwerp, was arrested by the Belgian police. He worked for a criminal organisation based in Antwerp. In September 2017, the federal police in Antwerp was sounding the alarm on the increase of cocaine trafficking in the port city, generating a parallel economy and a level of corruption that was never seen before. Customs officers and police officers very often received a large sum of money (up to €100,000 "to relocate containers to avoid police and customs control") by criminal organisations in Antwerp and the Netherlands, to send drugs through the customs controls without being intercepted.

The Dutch Ministry of Justice denied that 95% of all the cocaine that arrived at the Port of Antwerp was transported to the Netherlands, and they also denied the relationship of these drugs to the Dutch networks of the Moroccan mafia. However, writer and criminologist Teun Voeten published a book in 2020 called Drugs, where contradictory claims were made in anonymous interviews by Belgian inmates, and by people from certain neighbourhoods in Antwerp. These claims stated that the number of drugs destined for the Netherlands was around 90%. It also stated that criminal organisations based in the Netherlands functioned as distributors for these drugs. Many Moroccan traffickers have anonymously stated that the trafficking operations at the Port of Antwerp would be impressively easy to execute for young people from neighbourhoods in Antwerp and Amsterdam. The traffickers often make corrupt deals with police officers to keep the trafficking of drugs run smoothly in exchange for large sums of money.

=== Money laundering ===
Criminal networks often launder their money in Morocco, southern Spain, or Dubai. This illegal money often circulates through the Hawala system, a parallel banking system of Arab origin that is often used by organised crime syndicates. Interpol also mentioned that the Moroccan mafia has a major involvement in the synthetic drug market, particularly in the manufacturing of these drugs, as well as playing an important role in the trafficking of cannabis (hashish) from the Jbala region in Morocco. In Wouter Laumans' book on the Moroccan mafia, he cites that 80% of northern Morocco is built with illegal money that mostly originates from money laundering.

Dutch investigator Pieter Tops made an astonishing discovery in September 2018: trafficking networks in the Netherlands easily collect up to €20 billion through the trade of synthetic drugs such as XTC or amphetamines. Tops warned the Belgian authorities that the traffickers have so much money re-invested in legal businesses, which seriously affects the communities and neighbourhoods from where these traffickers originate. As mayor of Antwerp, Bart De Wever asked for reinforcements to investigate the drug trade and the Moroccan mafia in the city, to intercept a maximum number of people who are involved in these drug trafficking businesses.

=== Communication network ===
==== Communication through PGP ====
Networks of the Moroccan mafia communicate through PGP to prevent servers from being easily decrypted.

Communication between networks of the Moroccan mafia was mostly exercised by the use of Blackberry smartphone messaging equipped with PGP technology. On 19 April 2016, the Canadian authorities intervened a hosting company with the aim of decrypting the Dutch telecommunication servers of Ennetcom. The servers contained millions of messages that were sent through Ennetcom. The cybercrime investigators of the Netherlands Forensic Institute finally managed to decrypt the messages in Canada. When the messages were deciphered, the investigators found out that the messages were all written in Tarifit, a language that was unknown to them. The names of the criminals were also replaced by nicknames. Between 2016 and 2018, the Dutch police forces investigated the nicknames to identify commanders as well as contract killers. Following the dismantling of the Ennetcom network, several criminal organisations have converted to the use of other encrypted communication services.

Some criminals, including Saïd Razzouki, have been avoiding to communicate through electronic devices. Because of this, Razzouki could operate unknowingly for over 8 years before being arrested in Medellín by the DEA and FBI. Commanders or crime bosses are rarely found in Europe. They often stay hidden under the radar in places like Morocco, Latin-America, Arab states of the Persian Gulf, and Thailand.

==== Dismantling of the Encrochat and Sky ECC communication networks ====
EncroChat was a Europe-based communications network and service provider used primarily by organised crime members to plan criminal activities. Police infiltrated the network between March and June 2020 during a Europe-wide investigation. Other than major criminal activities such as large scale drug trafficking, the investigation exposed what would be a torture chamber alongside self made prisons, which were all built in shipping containers. It also exposed an excessive number of Dutch police uniforms owned by a criminal organisation. All of these were owned by a known rival of Ridouan Taghi, who allegedly used the torture chamber on members of Ridouan Taghi's organisation.

Sky Global was also a communications network and service provider based in Vancouver, Canada. Its most notable products were the secure messaging application Sky ECC and crypto-phones. A significant number of users were part of international crime organisations involved in drug trafficking, and the company management was also suspected of collusion. In a series of raids against criminal organisations in several countries in early 2021, a part of Sky's infrastructure in western Europe was dismantled, and the US Department of Justice issued an arrest warrant against the company's CEO Jean-François Eap.

The decryption of Sky ECC exposed in particular the inner workings of the Turtle clan and the El Ballouti clan. 27 tonnes of cocaine were also intercepted which were believed to be largely trafficked by these organisations, as well as corrupted police officers and lawyers who were involved.

== Notable clans and organisations ==
=== The Taghi organisation ===
Ridouan Taghi is a former Dutch-Moroccan drug trafficker and crime boss. He was specialised in forming criminal groups and coalitions that operated as international cocaine cartels. He is suspected of being behind the orchestration of several assassinations, attacks, and kidnappings in connection to the Mocro-War.

Documents produced by the Drug Enforcement Administration (DEA) of the United States, and sent to the Dutch police, exposed what appeared to be a super drug cartel headed by Ridouan Taghi, alongside Raffaele Imperiale (Camorra's drugs and arms dealer), Daniel Kinahan (Irish reputed gang boss) and Edin Gačanin (Bosnian drug trafficker). The DEA estimated that around a third of all cocaine trafficking in Europe was done through his organisation, with a virtually monopoly on Peruvian cocaine.

After the decryption of the telecommunication servers of Ennetcom by the Dutch and Canadian authorities, it also exposed a very close and personal friendship between Ridouan Taghi, and Chilean cartel boss Rico "El Rico" Eduardo Riquelme Vega, who was arrested in Santiago, Chile in 2017.

Following the arrest of Benaouf A. in 2013, and the assassinations of two rival drug lords, Gwenette Martha and Samir Bouyakhrichan in 2014, Taghi was able to establish himself as one of the most powerful drug traffickers in Europe. The Dutch government also considered him to be "one of the most dangerous drug traffickers in Europe".

Ridouan Taghi was able to keep a very low profile and run his operation unknowingly for many years. The first time his name was mentioned in a police report was in 2015, but by this time he already had left the Netherlands to live somewhere abroad. The Dutch authorities were only able to paint a clear picture of Taghi after Nabil B., a former member of Taghi's organisation, decided to turn state's evidence. Nabil B. was involved as a driver in a contract killing attempt, but the killers accidentally killed Hakim Changachi instead of the intended target. Changachi was part of a local crime family that allied themselves with Taghi. Because of the accidental killing, the relationship between Taghi and the Changachi family turned sour.

==== Attacks on the Dutch legal system ====
Taghi allegedly wanted to kill Nabil B. as a punishment for being involved in killing the wrong person, which eventually led to Nabil B. collaborating with the Dutch authorities instead. As a result of this, Taghi ordered to kill Nabil B.'s innocent brother, who was a non-criminal, respected business owner in Amsterdam-Noord.

Also Nabil B.'s lawyer Derk Wiersum was assassinated on the orders of Taghi, which eventually shocked the Netherlands. The Dutch parliament considered this as an attack on the Dutch legal system and the Dutch state, and a manhunt on Taghi by the Dutch authorities was eventually launched.

In August 2020, six prominent lawyers in the Netherlands were accused of having delivered information to Ridouan Taghi's organisation in exchange for high sums of money. Their names were also added to the Marengo trials. T. Youssef one of Taghi's lawyers, and also his cousin, had been arrested on 8 October 2021, after being suspected of planning a jailbreak and smuggling messages out of prison to Taghi's organisation.

In July 2021, the most prominent Dutch crime journalist Peter R. de Vries was assassinated after he left the studio of RTL Boulevard in Amsterdam, right after he appeared on a popular TV show. This assassination deeply shocked the Netherlands, with many politicians and celebrities sharing their condolences and speaking out on the increase of violence in the Netherlands. According to the Dutch authorities, all tracks lead to the already imprisoned Taghi. De Vries acted as a close confidant to Nabil B., the crown witness in the Marengo trial whose own brother, alongside his lawyer, were assassinated by Taghi's organisation for exposing their inner workings. The person who is suspected of killing De Vries, is a relative of the person who is in charge of Taghi's hit squad, which gives the Dutch authorities more reason to believe that Taghi's organisation is responsible for the killing. However, it is still unclear who gave the order of the shooting, since Taghi himself was already in a high-security prison at the time of the shooting.

==== Arrest ====
Following the attack on the Dutch news outlet De Telegraaf and the murders of journalist Martin Kok and lawyer Derk Wiersum, Ridouan Taghi became the most wanted man in the Netherlands for several years, with multiple international arrest warrants in his name. He was also ranked as one of the main fugitives on the Interpol list. To anyone who was able to give information that could have led to his arrest, a reward of €100.000 was promised by the Dutch authorities, which was the highest reward for a fugitive in Dutch history.

Taghi's right-hand man Saïd Razzouki took refuge in Medellín, Colombia under the protection of the Oficina de Envigado and the Clan del Golfo cartel, but was later on arrested by the Colombian authorities, and the United States' FBI and DEA.

In order to locate Razzouki, we needed the same techniques that were used 30 years ago to track down Pablo Escobar, because Razzouki applied the same routines in order to stay under the radar and escape every surveillance by the Colombian authorities. Razzouki did not use any technology or social media for eight years, to the extent that he did not update his family in the Netherlands of any news. Our investigators tracked him down by using intelligence planes that regularly flew over the city of Medellín with the aim of locating him. The last time the Elite Colombian Police Unit intervened in such a case, was during the operation carried out on 2 December 1993 to track down and shoot Pablo Escobar. Razzouki is suspected of drug trafficking, manufacture and possession of illegal substances, homicide, and terrorism. He had changed his physical appearance with the help of cosmetic surgery in order to look older. Razzouki belonged to a European criminal organisation of the Moroccan Mafia and was at the head of a group of traffickers from the Clan del Golfo cartel who were involved in the international export of cocaine, especially to Spain and Portugal.

— Jorge Ramírez, director-general of the National Police of Colombia on 10 February 2020 in Bogotá, after the arrest of Saïd Razzouki.

The Iranian government allegedly protected Taghi as he worked together with the Iranian secret service, to assassinate enemies of the Iranian state who were hiding out on European soil.

On 16 December 2019, Taghi was arrested in his mansion in Dubai after a manhunt by the Moroccan and European authorities, and three days later he was deported to the Netherlands. He is currently incarcerated in the maximum security prison of Vught, and he is the main suspect in the current marengo trial, which is considered to be the largest criminal trial in Dutch history. He is facing life of imprisonment without the possibility of parole. The former president of Suriname, Dési Bouterse, is faced with corruption charges after cooperating with Taghi and his left hand man Mao R.

=== The Bouyakhrichan organisation ===
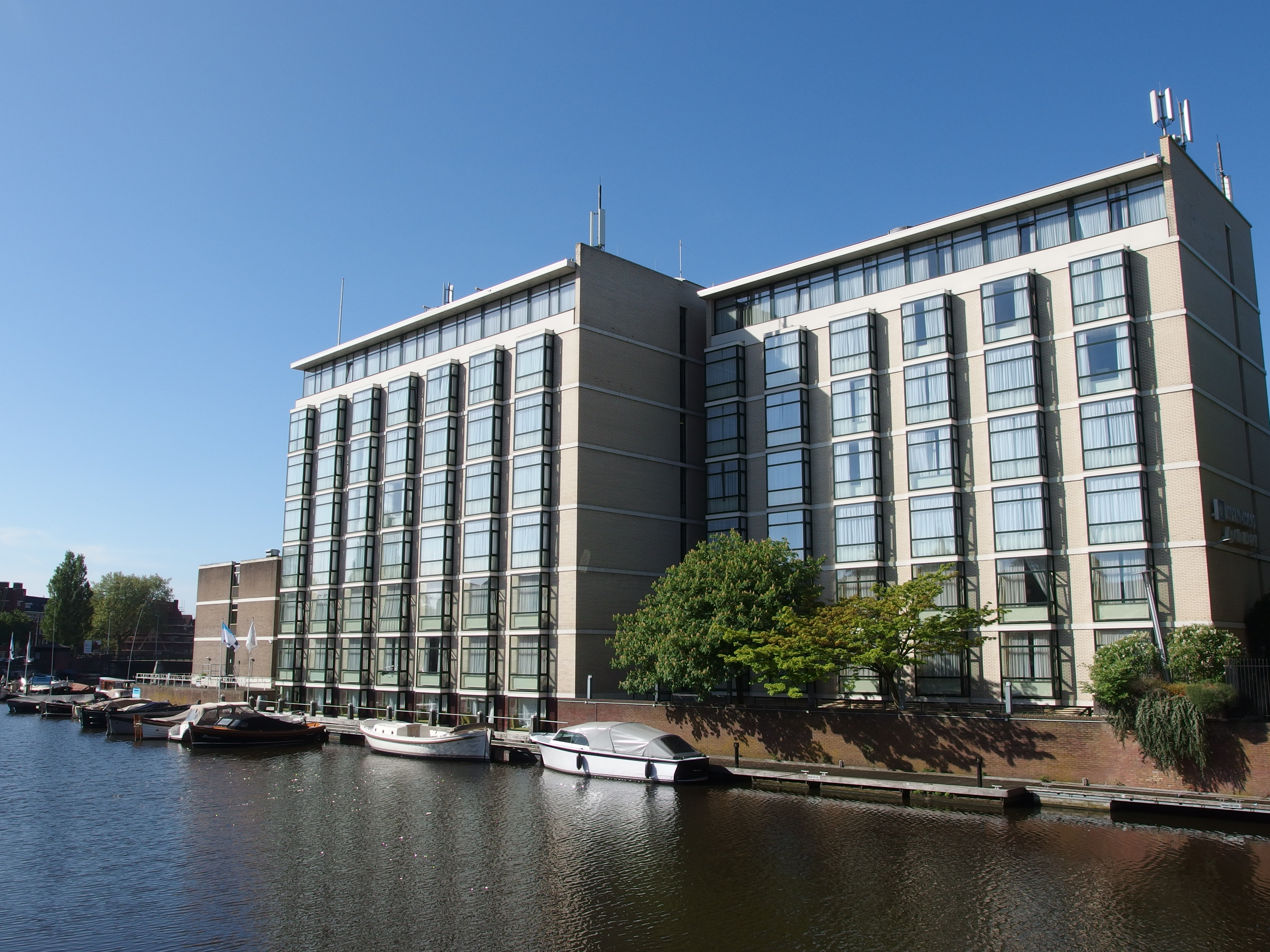
The Apollo Hotel in Amsterdam, where Samir Bouyakhrichan used to organise extravagant parties.

The Bouyakhrichan organisation was a criminal organisation led by Samir Bouyakhrichan (also known as Scarface), who was a billionaire entrepreneur and drug lord. Samir was specialised in large scale drug trafficking which he gained through collaborations with Colombian cartels. His organisation also operated in Spain, where it controlled parts of the Costa del Sol region.

Bouyakhrichan was known for using his fortune to organise extravagant private parties by renting luxurious rooms in places like Dubai and Amsterdam, which included champagne, cocaine, and a lot of women and escorts. The guests were mostly Moroccan and British. One of these private parties was that of 30 June 2012, at the Apollo Hotel in Amsterdam. During this evening, many major drug lords were present, alongside the famous Dutch singer Gordon.

Samir Bouyakhrichan was a known rival of the Taghi organisation, and he was also considered to be a rival of "Noffel". On 29 August 2014, at the age of 34, Samir was assassinated in southern Spain by 2 contract killers. The assassination was allegedly orchestrated by "Noffel"'s organisation.

After his death, his organisation was taken over by his brother Karim Bouyakhrichan (also known as Taxi). According to the Dutch authorities, Taghi and his associate Rico "El Rico" Eduardo Riquelme Vega were "hunting" for Karim to dismantle the Bouyakhrichan organisation.

==== Naima Jillal ====
Another notable member within the Bouyakhrichan organisation was Naima Jillal, who earned herself the reputation of the biggest female drug trafficker within the Mocro maffia. Nicknamed "Auntie" or "the Godmother of Cocaine", she became a key player within the international cocaine trade and acted as a broker between Latin-American cartels and European criminal organisations.

On 20 October 2019, Naima went missing, allegedly because multiple crime groups were keeping an eye on her after she tipped off drug shipments of rival organisations to the authorities. After her disappearance, there were allegedly images circulating on the internet of her body being chopped up into pieces. Authorities believe she is buried under a concrete floor in a warehouse in the port of Antwerp, but up until now no human remains were found. However, forensic researchers did find pieces of clothing and a handbag under the concrete floor, which were believed to be owned by Naima Jillal.

==== Café La Crème shooting ====
In 2017, two masked hitmen fired shots at the Café La Crème in Marrakesh, killing Hamza Chaib, a 26-year-old medical student, and injuring two others. A Glock 19 and a motorcycle used by the hitmen to flee were found charred nearby.

The hitmen were identified by the Marrakesh Prefecture Judicial Police as Shardyone Ulises Girigorio Semerel, a 29-year-old Dutch-Surinamese national, and Edwin Gabriel Robles Martínez, a 24-year-old Dutch-Dominican national. Six other suspects were detained. They were known to Moroccan authorities for their involvement in cases of international drug trafficking, kidnapping, armed robbery, and attempted homicide.

Their initial target was the owner of the lounge, Mustapha "Mous" el Fechtali, a member of the Bouyakhrichan clan involved in international money laundering.

Moroccan authorities are known to use torture on suspects to gain information, leading to the hitmen quickly pointing out Taghi as their ringleader. The shooting led to a closer collaboration between the Dutch and Moroccan authorities to combat organised crime, especially towards Taghi's organisation.

The hitmen were sentenced to death by the Marrakesh Court of Appeal in 2019. Mustapha el Fechtali was sentenced to 15 years in jail for drug trafficking. An alleged coordinator, 33-year-old Seddik Rais, was freed after his extradition from the Canary Islands.

=== The Ait Soussan organisation ===
The Ait Soussan organisation is a criminal organisation led by Houssine Ait Soussan. He is a major drug trafficker who also used to own the Dutch football-club ZVV 't Knooppunt. Houssine Ait Soussan is notably a prominent figure within the Moroccan mafia in the Netherlands and Belgium, and he was also allied with the Bouyakhrichan organisation. The Ait Soussan organisation is responsible for distributing tons of cocaine across all of Western Europe. Houssine Ait Soussan is also considered to be one of the original participating figures within the Mocro-War, which was sparked after a missing shipment of cocaine in the port of Antwerp.

As a result of this, Houssine Ait Soussan is believed to be behind the kidnapping of Abdelkader "the Jew" Bouker, a major Belgian-Moroccan drug trafficker who worked closely together with the Israeli mafia, and went missing in 2016.

He was also believed to be behind the kidnapping of Younes El Ballouti, the younger brother of Othman El Ballouti, who is considered to be one of the biggest drug lords in Belgium. Houssine Ait Soussan allegedly kidnapped him as revenge, because Colombian cartels preferred to work with the El Ballouti clan instead of his organisation.

Houssine Ait Soussan was for many years wanted by the Dutch and Belgian authorities for his involvement in numerous of assassinations and kidnappings, which mostly took place in Antwerp and Brussels. He orchestrated his kidnappings and assassinations from Central America, to stay off the radar from the European police. He was also believed to take refuge in Morocco and Dubai.

On 26 July 2015, Houssine Ait Soussan was arrested by the Moroccan police in the port of Tangier with false documents. A few days after his arrest, two searches took place in the apartments where he stayed at in Marrakesh. At least 10 false Dutch, French and Moroccan identity documents were found, alongside 34 luxury watches, 10 phones, two tablets, 178,570 dirhams and €700. Houssine Ait Soussan was eventually released after 3 months by the Moroccan authorities. The Dutch and Belgian authorities believe that Houssine Ait Soussan is currently running his operations while hiding out in Morocco.

=== The Turtle clan ===
The Turtle clan (also known as The Turtles or the El Yousfi crime family) is a Moroccan criminal organisation based in Antwerp (Belgium), who is believed to be active since 2010. The organisation is based around the El Yousfi family, who are originally from Nador, Morocco and based in Borgerhout, Antwerp. They are considered to be one of the 5 Moroccan drug clans who control the cocaine trade in the port of Antwerp. Several members of the clan were behind the theft of 200 kg of cocaine at the Port of Antwerp in 2012, which were intended for Benaouf A., the right-hand man of Houssine Ait Soussan. This theft eventually sparked the infamous Mocro-War across Belgium and the Netherlands, which resulted in countless kidnappings and assassinations.

In 2017, 21 shootings took place in Antwerp which were connected to the Turtle clan. The organisation, which is allied with the Mixers clan, is also at the origin of the illegal economy that dominates over the legal economy in the district of Borgerhout, Antwerp. The Turtle clan dominates the Belgian cocaine trade for over decade. The Flemish federal government often adopts the nickname "Borgerokko" or "the capital of coke" for the city of Antwerp and its districts.

The two main commanders of the organisation, Nacerdine Turtle and Nordine El H. are currently running their organisation from Dubai. Nordine El H. was arrested in Dubai on 18 June 2020, due to an international arrest warrant that was sent out by the Belgian courts for his involvement in large scale drug trafficking, but he was eventually released on bail. The majority of the Turtle clan members are currently suspected of hiding out in Dubai and Nador, Morocco.

In 2016, a member of the family celebrated his wedding in the Borgerhout district of Antwerp, causing controversy throughout the country as well as on social media. The controversy revolved particularly around the procession that included dozens of luxury cars, which paraded through the lower class district of Borgerhout. According to the Belgian press, the price of these cars was estimated at €7 million.

Since 2018, many grenade attacks have occurred in the streets of Antwerp. They are particularly linked to the organisation of the Turtles.

=== The Noffel clan ===
The Noffel clan was a criminal organisation that was founded by Naoufal "Noffel" Fassih. Naoufal moved to his cousin Abdelhadi Yaqout in Spain, at that time already one of the richest personalities in Marbella. Naoufal allied himself with the Taghi organisation, the Irish Mob and some members of the Martha organisation, to assassinate the billionaire drug lord Samir Bouyakhrichan in 2014. Naoufal was eventually spending more time in Ireland than in Spain. His relationship with Ireland's Kinahan clan was so strong that they even shared the same hideouts. It was also in an apartment of the Irish Kinahan clan where Naoufal was eventually arrested by the special forces of Dublin. He was sentenced by the Dutch court to life of imprisonment.

Naoufal's cousin, Abdelhadi Yaqout, was a multi-millionaire businessman. He originated from Khouribga, in the south of Casablanca (Morocco), where he had spent a part of his childhood. After he emigrated to Spain, he became a very successful entrepreneur in Marbella. He was the owner of several clubs and bars in Puerto Banús, including the Rotana Shisha Lounge, the Portside bar, and the Tibu nightclub, which were frequently visited by Arab princes, Russian businessmen and celebrities. Yaqout was also a friend of the Anglo-Egyptian billionaire Mohamed Al-Fayed.

Yaqout laundered money for the Kinahan clan, and he was a partner of Daniel Kinahan. According to the Spanish authorities, they had very close relations. Yaqout had also been linked to the timeshare vacation apartment scam of British gangster John "Goldfinger" Palmer (who was murdered in 2015). This scam cheated 20,000 customers out of their money which reached a figure of up to €400 million. It was reported that Yaqout was involved in cocaine trafficking alongside prominent figures of the Moroccan mafia, such as his cousin Naoufal Fassih and Ridouan Taghi.

Yaqout was assassinated in his car in the neighbourhood of Las Petunias in San Pedro de Alcántara on 22 January 2019. At least one hitman was involved, riddling the drivers' side of Yaqout's Bentley with more than 20 bullets while he was waiting for an electric gate to open. He allegedly tried to escape the assassination by crawling onto the passenger side but was found dead halfway between the seats. He is buried in his hometown in Khouribga, Morocco. The Bouyakhrichan organisation are the main suspects of this assassination.

Naoufal Fassih was alongside Taghi allegedly allied with the Iranian secret service and ordered to carry out gangland-style killings on enemies of the Iranian government who were hiding out on European soil.

=== The Kaabouni organisation ===
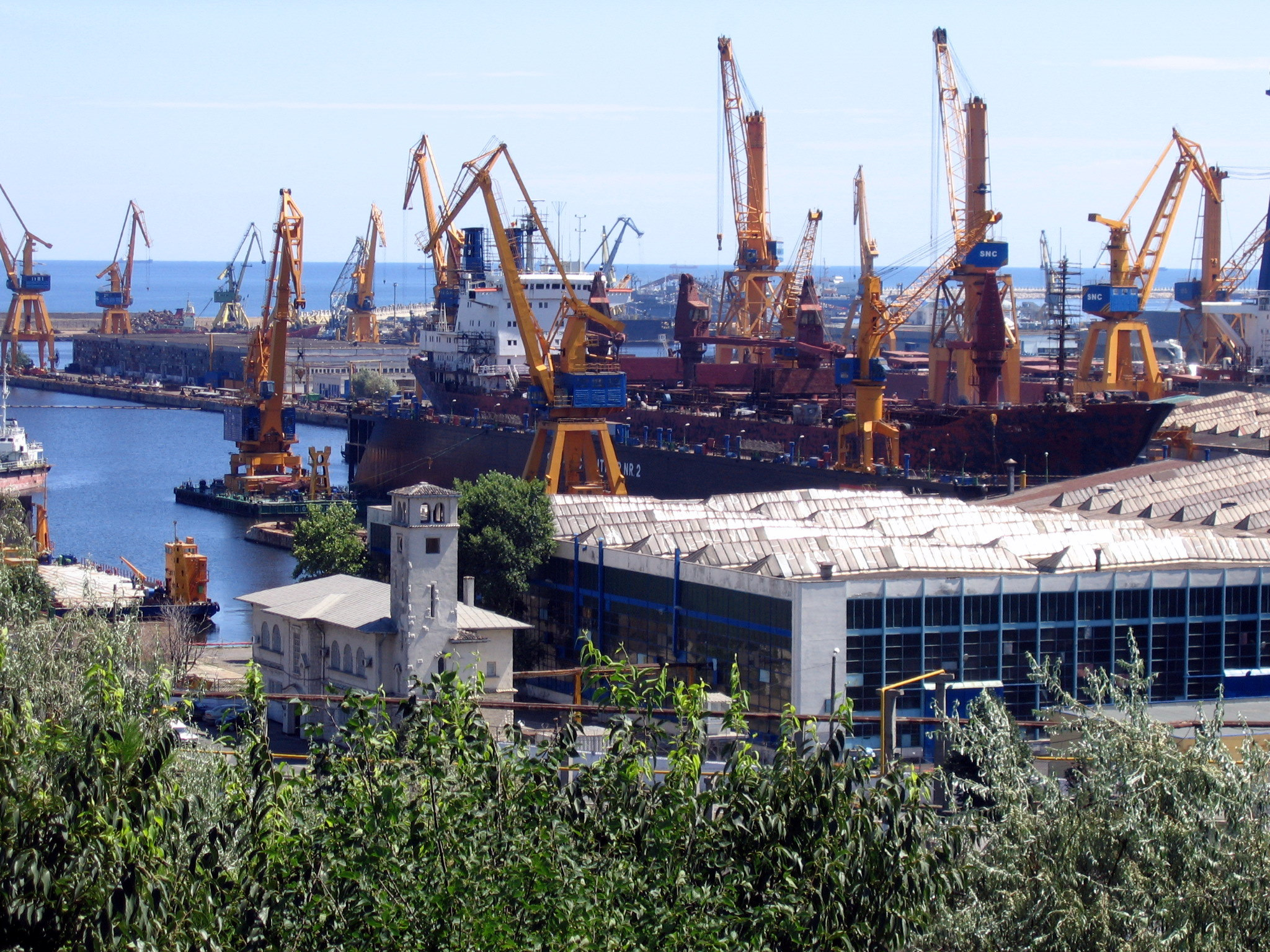
Port of Constanța, where 2.5 tons of cocaine was seized.

Mimoun "Rocky" Kaabouni, who was nicknamed "The Moroccan Escobar", was born in Ben Taïeb, a village in the province of Nador. He grew up in Hoensbroek, in the Netherlands, where he and his brother owned a coffeeshop named Happy Days. While often visiting Amsterdam, he eventually started meeting big names within the Moroccan mafia with whom he maintained regular contact. Mimoun left the Netherlands for southern Spain and Romania, where he founded his own criminal organisation made up of Lithuanians and Colombians. Mimoun, who was already bringing in tons of cocaine through the ports of Antwerp, Rotterdam, Amsterdam, and Algeciras, wanted to create a new route in Romania through the port of Constanța. He is currently serving a 19-year prison sentence in Romania for a record seizure of 2.5 tons of cocaine (the biggest seizure of cocaine in the country's history). Mimoun was arrested in 2016 when he tried to leave Spain through the Málaga Airport after the seizure in Romania, which was worth €600 million. It was one of the largest drug seizures in Eastern European history.

=== The Mixers clan ===
The Mixers (also known as the Sebabti crime family), is a Moroccan crime family made up of five brothers who were born in Borgerhout, Antwerp, and originate from Berkane in north-eastern Morocco. The Mixers are suspected of having collaborated with Colombian cartels, where they had the role of smuggling drugs through the Port of Antwerp, and supplying criminal organisations all over Europe. The organisation became active in the early 2000s, and they are considered to be the oldest drug trafficking network which is still active in Antwerp. They are also considered to be one of the 5 Moroccan drug clans who control the cocaine trade in the port of Antwerp.

The Mixers are seen by Belgian politicians as one of the most dangerous Belgian drug networks in the country, due to their excessive criminal staff and large numbers of people who are hired in exchange for large sums of money. In the summer of 2018, one of the Mixers was spotted in Tangier driving an exclusive Bentley Continental GT.

In 2017, the Port of Antwerp once again broke an intercepted drug record. The Mixers were among the main suspects. The Belgian special services have joined forces with the Moroccan authorities to investigate this family in Morocco. The Moroccan police intercepted €10.2 million in cash in a €400,000 apartment in Tangier, alongside a villa in Berkane, as well as several luxury boats on the Saïdia coast.

In 2019, a significant number of bombs and grenades were thrown in several neighbourhoods of Antwerp which were aimed at rival gangs. According to the mayor of Antwerp, Bart De Wever, the perpetrators would have been hired men working for the Mixers clan.

=== The El Ballouti clan ===
The El Ballouti clan is based in Antwerp, Belgium and led by drug lord Othman El Ballouti. Originally from Al Hoceïma, Othman grew up in the district of Borgerhout, and from a very early age he regularly visited the Port of Antwerp. With the goal of never getting caught by the police, he trafficked thousands of euros in narcotics every day. The newspaper De Volkskrant describes: "Othman climbed the containers and knew how to calculate very well. He quickly stopped climbing the containers by establishing his own gang who did the climbing instead."

Othman later on emigrated to Dubai, where he acquired 4 Villas. He also owns an apartment in the famous Address Residence Sky View which is worth 1.5 million euros, alongside six other luxury homes with a total value of around €8.5 million. This information was published by the OCCRP (Organised Crime and Corruption Reporting Project) after he escaped during an arrest at the Zaventem airport in Brussels, in 2016. The Belgian authorities discovered that Othman El Ballouti has a net worth of at least €100 million, a number that ranks him amongst the richest Belgians in the country.

The El Ballouti clan is now considered as one of the largest drug trafficking networks in Belgium, and they are also considered to be one of the 5 Moroccan drug clans who control the cocaine trade in the port of Antwerp.

Alongside the Mixers clan and Turtle clan, the El Ballouti clan is held responsible for a significant number of bombs and grenades that were thrown in several neighbourhoods of Antwerp, which were aimed at rival gangs.

Othman El Ballouti is currently hiding out in Dubai, from where he is running his drug operation in Europe.

=== The Fish Farmers clan ===
The Fish Farmers clan (Dutch: De Visboeren) are led by the owners of the well-known fishmonger De Antwerpse Visser in the districts of Borgerhout and Kiel in Antwerp. The organisation is led by the brothers Mohamed A., Rachid A. and Hassan A., who quickly established themselves as main contributors within the international cocaine trade. They established the organisation in the early 2010s and took control over the cocaine trade throughout Flanders. Dozens of containers from Colombian cartels were trafficked through the organisation of the Fish Farmers clan. They very quickly competed against other organisations within the Moroccan mafia.

In 2018, the Kali-team (an anti-Moroccan mafia police unit from Antwerp) discovered that the Fish Farmers were amongst the main owners of a luxury suite in the Hilton hotel near the Tangier-Ville railway station in Morocco. In March 2020, the three brothers and their father Mohamed (73) were sentenced up to eight years in prison.

=== The Banana gang ===
In 2015, the Belgian authorities dismantled the Belgian-Moroccan Banana gang (Dutch: De Bananenbende), which was led by Karim A., Nabil A. and Khalid O.H., after a seizure that contained 3.4 tonnes of cocaine in Antwerp. The drugs were hidden in two containers of bananas from Colombia that had passed through Ecuador. The drugs were estimated of being worth near €100 million. The investigators admitted that the clan had been importing shipments of this type for many years and that they had important links with several Moroccan clans in the Netherlands. Fourteen people were arrested, including the manager of a hookah bar in Antwerp, and the owner of a car dealership. The Belgian intelligence services estimated that this clan generated around €300 million a year, with importing no more than 10 tonnes of cocaine from South America.

== Alliances ==
=== Iranian intelligence agencies ===
The Dutch government and its intelligence service AIVD claim to have "strong evidence" that Iran used Dutch-Moroccan gangsters to eliminate at least two of its "enemies of the state" on foreign soil, but also that it was actively protecting crime bosses by providing them with a safe haven. The Dutch Ministry of Justice suspects that Ridouan Taghi was protected by Iran's secret service, and claim that he received this level of protection from the Iranian government because he was instrumental in helping Iran eliminate one or more of its most wanted "enemies of the state". According to the Dutch authorities he was believed to take frequent trips to Iran on fast private yachts, while he was hiding out in Dubai. After making the over 150 km trip, Taghi allegedly had several safe houses at his disposal.

These allegations came after the gangland-style assassination of Ali Motamed, a 56-year-old electrician, who had settled in a rowhouse after coming to the Netherlands as a refugee. He was killed on 15 December 2015, by two hitmen.

For a while, investigators couldn't find a clue for a motive behind the killing. Then it became known that "Ali Motamed" was actually Mohammad-Reza Kolahi, a member of the People's Mujahedin of Iran, who, according to Iranian authorities, was the mastermind behind the 1981 bombing of the headquarters of the Islamic Republican Party, killing over 70 officials.

A break in the murder case of "Motamed" occurred when prosecutors got their hands-on text messages after they were able to unlock a decrypted cell phone from one of the participants in the plot. The two hitmen were discovered to have extensive criminal records and longstanding ties to organised crime. The text messages showed they were monitoring "Motamed", and had no clue why he was targeted, only that they were assigned with the task and were eager to get the job done. In April 2019, they were sentenced to 25 and 20 years of imprisonment for their roles in the murder. The messages also implicated "Noffel", who was found guilty for ordering the murder and sentenced to life in prison for his involvement in this hit. However, all three suspects remain silent about any of their involvement in this case.

Dutch investigators were baffled when it became clear that the killers of "Motamed" were working on the orders of the Dutch-Moroccan crime boss "Noffel", a close associate of Ridouan Taghi. The Dutch government sees "Motamed" as the link between Taghi and the Iranian secret service.

However, the execution of Mohammad-Reza Kolahi ("Ali Motamed") was not the only murder in which the Dutch government accuses Iran of being involved in. In 2017, an assassin shot several bullets into Ahmad Mola Nissi, the leader of the Iranian separatist group Arab Struggle Movement for the Liberation of Ahwaz. Nissi died in front of his house in The Hague, after living in the Netherlands for over a decade. Dutch investigators believe a criminal organisation from the port city of Rotterdam was involved in this hit.

In June 2018, the Dutch government evicted two diplomats from the Iranian embassy and deported them from the country. The two men were members of Iran's intelligence agencies. This case eventually created more tension between the 2 countries.

== Public opinion and media ==
=== Political reactions ===
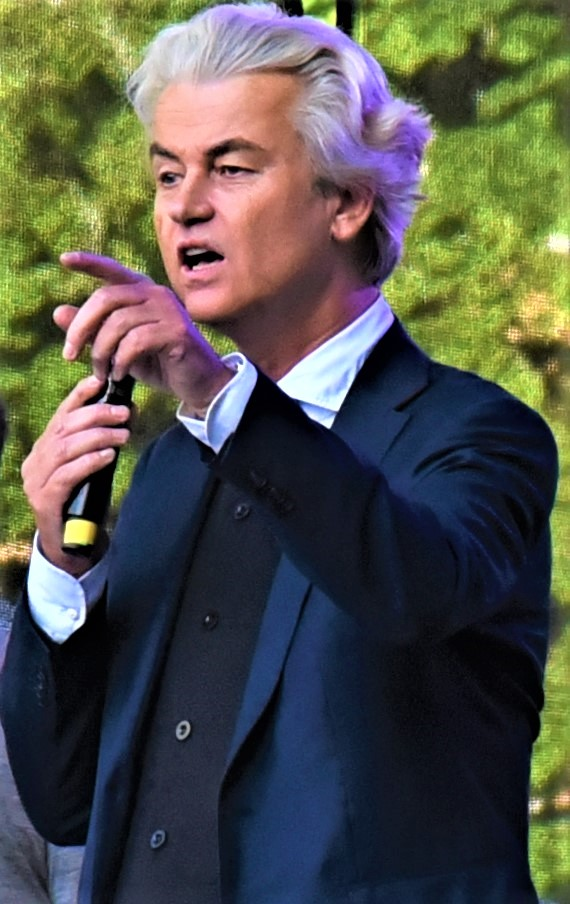
Geert Wilders discussed the Moroccan mafia in the Dutch parliament in 2019.

During the 2010s, the Moroccan mafia was widely talked about in Dutch and Belgian politics. After the assassination of Derk Wiersum, a lawyer with information about Ridouan Taghi, Geert Wilders expressed his discontent in the Dutch parliament.

We are no more boss in our own country and there is no more authority. Disorder, violence, terror, this is what affects Amsterdam and several other parts of the country. A brutally murdered lawyer, the brother of a key witness killed, rocket launcher attacks on our media outlets, grenades exploding in our streets and decapitated [sic] heads in front of our coffee shops. The Moroccan mafia has become the boss in this country. And they are getting stronger and more violent every day. Everyone in the street is fed up with the presence of Moroccans. This mafia in Amsterdam is not from Norway, it is from Morocco. Don't contradict me when I tell you that the Netherlands has a problem of Moroccans.

— Geert Wilders, leader of the Party for Freedom (PVV), on 19 September 2019 in the national parliament of the Netherlands, after the assassination of Derk Wiersum.

I agree with Wilders if he says that there is a Moroccan mafia problem in the Netherlands. I also agree with him if he says that Moroccans are predominantly present in the crime statistics of the Netherlands. But I wonder what you are implying with "a problem of Moroccans in the Netherlands". The other Moroccans who are living honest lives and hear that "there is a problem of Moroccans" can be affected very deeply by this. Personally, as a liberal, as a member of this democratic society, I think that we must judge people on their individual behavior, and not on the ethnic group they belong to. Every Moroccan who wants to build a future in the Netherlands by obeying our system is in their right to do so.

— Response from Dutch Prime Minister Mark Rutte to Geert Wilders on 19 September 2019 in the national parliament of the Netherlands.

I have a lot of people who come to my house to complain, telling me that they see a lot of Moroccans hanging out in the alleys with bulletproof vests under their jackets. They are undoubtedly men who have relations with the Moroccan mafia. Death threats should not be taken into account. It won't change anything. These men can appear at any time and shoot you. It is inevitable.

— Jos Van Gennip, Minister of Foreign Affairs, after the assassination of Reduan Bakkali.

Of course, the Netherlands is not on the same level as Mexico yet. We do not have 14.400 assassinations. But if you look at the infrastructure, the amount of money raised by organised crime, and the black market, then yes, we are becoming a narco-state.

— Joan Struijs, president of the largest police union in the Netherlands, after the assassination of Derk Wiersum.

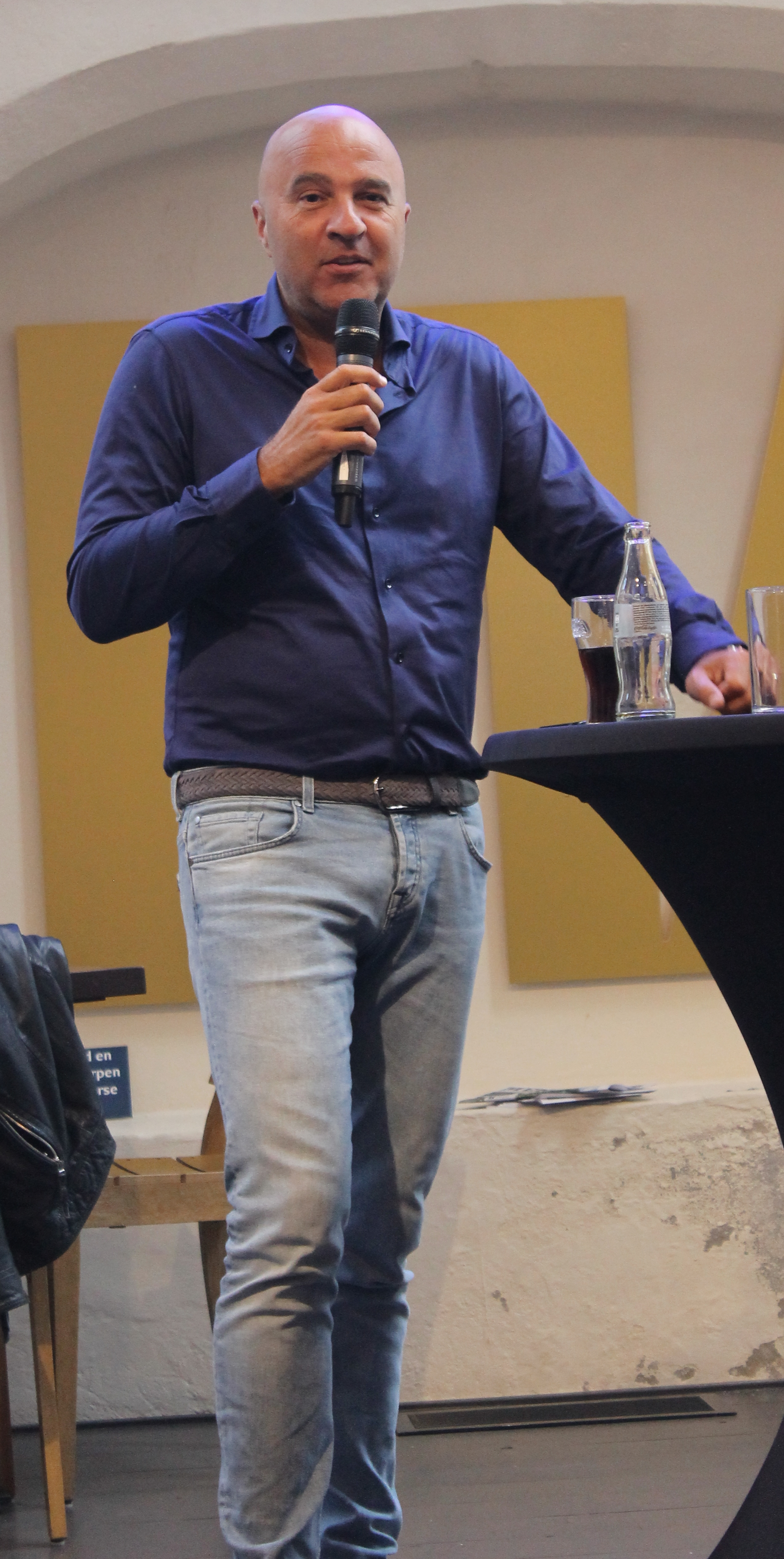
John van den Heuvel was targeted by Ridouan Taghi for exposing his organisation on television.

Journalist and crime reporter John van den Heuvel was targeted by the Moroccan mafia after he made numerous statements about the workings of their criminal activities. In June 2018, the headquarter of the Dutch newspaper Panorama was attacked by a rocket launcher after they published articles on the Moroccan mafia. Shortly afterwards, the headquarter of another Dutch news-outlet De Telegraaf was attacked by a car, which was rammed into the office and set on fire afterwards. John van den Heuvel, who worked for De Telegraaf in the past, delivered his personal opinion on Dutch television by evoking the name of the criminal who was allegedly responsible:

Ridouan Taghi is the most wanted criminal in the Netherlands. Every time we say or write something about him, there are consequences, attacks and threats. When you are a journalist who writes about him, you take risks of getting murdered.

— John van den Heuvel on 26 June 2018 after the attack on De Telegraaf's head office.

Following this statement, John van den Heuvel was targeted by criminals who planned attacks against him. During a police investigation, a rocket launcher was found in the home of Yassine A., which he had prepared to use on the residence of John van den Heuvel. As a result of this, John van den Heuvel cancelled his television program on RTL Boulevard where he was to participate as the host of a show. A year later he also received death threats from Ridouan Taghi, who was on the run. He warned John van den Heuvel that his name was on Taghi's blacklist. Taghi also placed a bounty on John van den Heuvel for a large sum of money. In December 2019, Ridouan Taghi was eventually arrested in Dubai. Following this event, John van den Heuvel had delivered another statement

I am so relieved. I can't even believe it. Exactly two years ago I was forced to have as much security as possible due to threats. Ever since then, i have never walked alone in the streets. It was heavy. Fortunately, I could still do my job. It was a difficult time in my career. When you hear such news, it is an incredible relief.

— John van den Heuvel on 16 December 2019 after Taghi's arrest in Dubai.

In 2017, writer Raf Sauviller published his book Borgerokko Maffia, which was distributed to many libraries across Flanders (Belgium) and the Netherlands. In his book, he discusses the corruption that takes place in the Port of Antwerp amongst police officers and Customs controls. According to research which was carried out in 2018, the municipality of Borgerhout, Antwerp, had an illegal economy which was larger than the regular economy due to the influx of funds by the Moroccan mafia. During an interview by the newspaper De Morgen on the context of this book, the mayor of Antwerp, Bart De Wever, admitted that there were many difficulties on intercepting the main commanders of the Moroccan mafia in Antwerp. He also stated:

It is very easy for the Moroccan mafia to infiltrate Belgian politics. They do more damage than the drugs itself. I think it is unfair for leaders of political parties to see their party collapse. I already prefer to warn them that my political party will not be a potential collaborator. These organisations are content with an incredible turnover that can make them amongst the richest in Morocco. This week we have created the Kali-team. A team that is made up of 40 investigators to combat the Moroccan mafia in the Port of Antwerp.

— Mayor of Antwerp Bart De Wever on 3 September 2018.

=== Media coverage ===
The many murders which were carried out by the Moroccan mafia were a turning point in criminal journalism across Belgium and the Netherlands. Although the Moroccan mafia is not the first criminal phenomenon in these countries, it is the first to receive both international and intensive media coverage. The Dutch virtual tax reforms of the 2010s encouraged the emergence of inexpensive print media, which could therefore be widely distributed and relayed. These broadcasts were the precursors of a trend that gained momentum after the assassination of journalist Martin Kok in 2016. The Dutch newspaper De Telegraaf benefited greatly from the public enthusiasm for the criminal war that was taking place in its cities, which received unprecedented media coverage. While some Dutch media outlets decided to censor the first and last names of the editors who published articles, other news outlets like De Telegraaf did not give into the panic, and refused to practice censorship.

After the attacks on De Telegraaf and Panorama in 2017, lawyer Christien Wildeman stated:

The impact is heavy on editors, journalism and society, but we will never remain silent. Almost a thousand people work in the head office. We are far from ignoring their feelings of insecurity in their workplace. Our social rights and democracy are under unbearable pressure, and we must all fight together. From these attacks, we learned a lot of things, notably that we must always remain vigilant.

Over the years, foreign media outlets also reported on the Moroccan mafia, particularly in Germany, Spain, Italy, Brazil, Colombia, Chile, Morocco, and the United Kingdom. BBC News stated in 2019 that the Netherlands was in the process of becoming a narco-state.

=== In popular culture ===
- The Dutch series Mocro Maffia was released by the Dutch streaming service Videoland. It tells a fictional story which is heavily influenced by certain events of the Mocro-War.
- The French prison film A Prophet shows passages which depict the trafficking of hashish in convoys on the French highway. This type of trafficking has been traditionally done for many years to smuggle hash from Morocco across Western Europe.
- The Belgian crime-comedy film Patser ('Gangsta') was released in Dutch and Belgian cinemas in February 2018. The storyline is loosely based on The Turtle clan from Antwerp.
- In the fourth season of the British crime series Topboy, the protagonist Dushane links up with Moroccan drug traffickers in the Spanish coast city La Linea. They eventually become the main suppliers of Dushane's gang, trafficking cannabis and cocaine from Morocco, through Spain into London.
