= Murder of Derk Wiersum =

Shooting death of Dutch lawyer Derk Wiersum

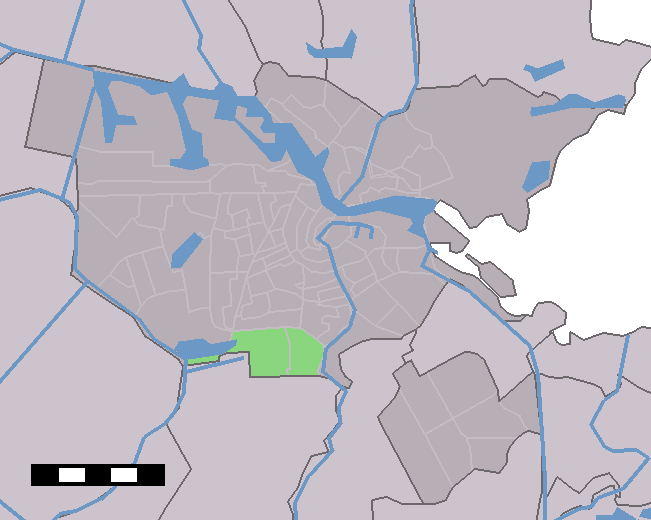
- Location of Buitenveldert in Amsterdam
- Location: 52.324178°N 4.875166°E; Amsterdam, Netherlands
- Date: 18 September 2019; 07:40 (CEST)
- Target: Derk Wiersum
- Attack type: Shooting with handgun
- Weapon: Handgun
- Victim: Derk Wiersum
- Perpetrators: Giërmo Brown; Anouar Taghi

On the morning of 18 September 2019, Dutch lawyer Derk Wiersum was shot and killed near his home in Amsterdam. At the time of his death, Wiersum was a lawyer for state witness Nabil B. in the Marengo case against the so-called 'Mocro Maffia' led by Ridouan Taghi. The murder caused great shock in the Dutch legal community; it was termed "an attack on the rule of law".

== Background ==
Derk Wiersum started as lawyer of Nabil B. in the Marengo process against the Mocro Maffia allegedly led by Ridouan Taghi in 2017. In the Marengo process, 16 suspects were standing trial for multiple murders and attempted murders between 2015 and 2017. Ridouan Taghi and his henchman Saïd Razzouki were being prosecuted for ordering these murders and for leading a criminal organization. Nabil B. was arrested on 14 January 2017 for prohibited possession of weapons and on 5 September 2017 for his involvement in the murder of Hakim Changachi, who was killed on 12 January 2017. Nabil B. was also suspected of involvement in other murders. Changachi was a good friend of Nabil B. and not the intended target of the attack that resulted in his murder. Because of this, Nabil B. felt guilty and told the family of Changachi about his involvement. Taghi found out about this and put Nabil B. on a death list. Nabil B. felt unsafe and decided to become a state witness in exchange for halving his prison sentence. A week after the announcement of Nabil B. being state witness, on 29 March 2018, his brother Reduan B. was killed by Shurandy 'Andy' S.

== Murder ==
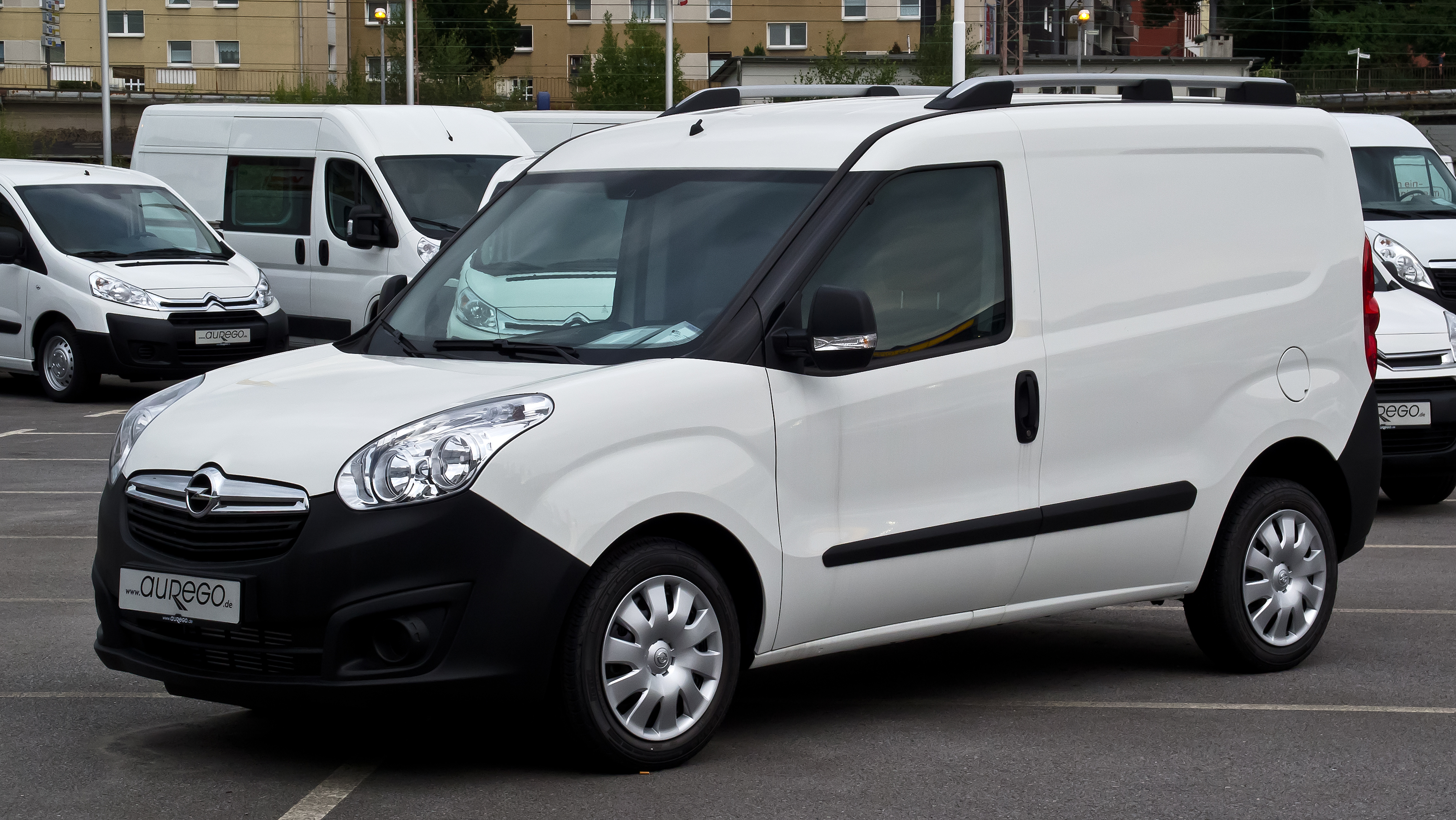
Car similar to the one used as getaway car

In the morning on 18 September 2019 around 7:40 local time (CEST), Derk Wiersum left his home in the Imstenrade in the Amsterdam neighbourhood Buitenveldert to go to his work by car. When Wiersum stepped in his car, a hoodie-wearing man dressed in black appeared on the driver side of the car. The man tried to shoot twice at Wiersum, but the weapon faltered. The shooter ran away and Wiersum went after him. According to a witness, who was 15 meters from the murder, Wiersum and the shooter had an argument near Wiersum's car. The witness heard Wiersum say words like "piss off" and "goddamnit." The shooter shot again at Wiersum and hit him ten times in the head, neck and upper body. Wiersum died on the scene. The shooter fled the scene and escaped in a white Opel Combo. A second person was waiting in the getaway car.

== Victim ==
Derk Wiersum
- Born: 30 August 1975; Amsterdam, Netherlands
- Died: 18 September 2019 (aged 44); Amsterdam, Netherlands
- Cause of death: Ballistic trauma
- Education: University of Groningen (legal education)
- Occupation: Lawyer
- Years active: 2003–2019
- Known for: Lawyer of state witness Nabil B.
- Spouse: Arjette Wiersum
- Children: 2

Derk Wiersum was born on 30 August 1975 in Amsterdam. He started his legal education with criminal law as a specialization at the University of Groningen in 1995. He was sworn in as a lawyer in 2003. He started his career at Van Gessel Advocaten. After ten years he started a law firm together with Bart Stapert. In 2017 he started working at Blaauw Advocaten. Wiersum started his own law firm in March 2019. He also worked as a deputy judge at the Breda court. In recent years before his death, Wiersum has focused primarily on serious and organized crime. Besides his work as lawyer and judge, he was treasurer for Stichting Rechtshulp Terdoodveroordeelden, a now defunct anti-death penalty organisation that provided international legal assistance to convicts who had been sentenced to death, and he worked as a lawyer for the Dutch & Detained foundation, which provides independent legal advice to Dutch nationals who are detained abroad.

Derk Wiersum was married to Arjette Wiersum, and they had two children together.

== Suspects ==
The police arrested a first male suspect on 1 October 2019 in line for checking in at Schiphol. No details were given about the suspect. It's believed that this man was the driver of the getaway car, which was found in Almere. On the night of 20 November 2019, 26-year-old Anouar Taghi from Maarssen was arrested on a highway. He is a cousin of Ridouan Taghi, and police suspect him to be the organizer of the murder. Anouar Taghi was a member of the Utrecht 'Audi-bende', a gang that robbed ATMs using explosives (a so-called plofkraak), driving away in fast cars with a preference for the brand Audi. In 2016 he was sentenced to four years in prison for such a robbery in Meppen. Anouar Taghi was already under investigation by the police. The criminal investigation department assumes that he led a group of co-suspects who were dealing with stolen cars, used for ram-raiding and plofkraken. Those cars were parked in a warehouse in Utrecht, cleaned and "whipped" (checked for eavesdropping equipment or monitoring beacons).

At the end of April 2020, Anouar Taghi was arrested for his involvement in an attempted murder and for participation in a criminal organization. On 30 October 2019, a 28-year-old man was attacked by three men wearing balaclavas with a sledgehammer in Utrecht. The victim was badly injured, but survived the attack. Taghi was arrested for this attempted murder together with two other men from Utrecht. In addition, the police suspect Taghi of leading a criminal organization of which the two other men arrested are also members. This gang is suspected of facilitating liquidations by stealing cars and reselling them. Sources within the criminal circuit state that the victim of the sledgehammer attack also belonged to the organization, but no longer wanted to cooperate. According to these sources, the suspects wanted to send a signal with the attack. The Volkswagen Transporter, used in the scouting before the murder of Derk Wiersum, was also stolen by someone from this criminal organization.

On 6 January 2020, the OM announced that the man arrested in October is the 36-year-old Giërmo Brown from Almere, he is of Surinamese descent. The OM says he is co-perpetrator of the murder. It's unknown if this means that he is the shooter. Brown is also suspected of observing the victim in the stolen vehicles from 30 August 2019, alone or with others, and the handling of these vehicles from 11 June 2019. When the getaway car, white Opel Combo, was shown on television by the police, Brown bought a plane ticket to Suriname. He never got on the plane as he was arrested at the airport. In 2012, Brown committed two violent robberies together with someone else. He was sentenced to 7 years in prison for these robberies. Brown was also convicted of owning 50 grams of hashish in the prison in Vught in 2015. In 2016, Brown abused an employee of the same prison. Brown has a girlfriend and is a father of six children. He has been assessed as intellectually disabled.

A 31-year-old man was arrested on 27 January 2020. The suspect was later named as Moreno Bieseswar from Rotterdam. He is suspected of co-perpetrating the murder. Bieseswar is intellectually disabled and, according to experts, has a personality disorder with narcissistic traits. He has two children.

Giërmo Brown and Moreno Bieseswar flew together from Paris to Suriname through French Guiana on 28 March 2019. They went back to the Netherlands on 8 May 2019. Both men are suspects in the murders of the 49-years-old Dennis Groenfelt from Utrecht and the 19-years-old Surinamese girl Cadischa Prika in Paramaribo on 6 May 2019. Groenfelt was part of the ‘Moes No Limit’ gang led by Mustapha F., who is a rival of Ridouan Taghi. The OM thinks Groenfelt and Prika were killed on behalf of Taghi.

== Investigation ==
After the murder, the police issued a description of the suspect. They were looking for a man between 20 and 25 years old, with a slender stature, about 1.75 metres tall, and he was dressed in dark clothes. Because the man wore a hoodie, his physical features couldn't be identified. The shooter escaped in a white Opel Combo with false licence plate. A second person was waiting in the getaway car. It's believed that this person was the man arrested on 1 October 2019. The getaway car was stolen in June 2019 in Rotterdam. The police found out that this car was near the house of the victim a day before the murder. The Opel Combo was found in Almere at the house of Brown, it's unknown when the car was found.

The investigation made clear that more vehicles were probably involved in the case. Two days before the murder a grey Volkswagen Transporter, used for disabled transportation, was driving in the neighbourhood where the victim lived for about two hours. This van was stolen on 5 September 2019 in Brunssum, and was found on 23 September 2019 in a parking garage in Amsterdam-Zuidoost with a flat tire. On 24 September 2019, a burnt out Renault Mégane was found in Voorburg. Investigation made clear that this car was stolen in June 2019 in Nieuwegein. The car was spotted multiple times near the house of Wiersum in the end of August 2019.

On 19 November 2019, the police detained two persons for fencing a stolen vehicle used to monitor the victim before the murder. They were released after questioning. The next day, the police arrested Anouar Taghi, a cousin of Ridouan Taghi. In one of the vehicles used in the murder, the police found information that could be linked to Anouar Taghi. He is suspected to be the organizer of the murder. Ridouan Taghi was arrest by the Dubai Police Force on 16 December 2019 in an apartment in Dubai. He was deported to the Netherlands on 18 December 2019. There is no evidence yet that Taghi ordered the murder. He is currently detained in Nieuw Vosseveld.

23-year-old Jerlonny P., also known as rapper Kerron, from Brunssum was arrested for stealing the Volkswagen Transporter and delivering it to Anouar Taghi. As a specialist in car theft, he came into contact with the Mocro Maffia. He incorporates his criminal activities into his rap lyrics.

On 21 October 2020, the police investigated a location in Utrecht in connection to the murder. Investigations showed that on the day of the murder, the executors of the murder sent accomplices to a place in Utrecht for a meeting. Police believe this meeting was a money transfer with representatives of the murder originator.

During an interim session in the case against Anouar Taghi in December 2021 it became clear that Jaouad F. is suspected to have been in contact with Anouar Taghi and others about the preparations for the murder. Jaouad F. from Nieuwegein is another nephew of Ridouan Taghi. F. was arrested in October 2021 in Morocco for his suspected involvement in the Café La Crème lounge shooting in Marrakesh in 2017, in which a son of a prominent Moroccan judge was killed.

== Trial ==
The first session of the 'Pulheim' case on 15 January 2020 took place in the extra secure Bunker location in Amsterdam. This was preparatory session, which, among other things, looked at the provisional detention of Giërmo Brown. During this session, the prosecutor said they have the following evidence against Brown for his involvement in the murder. There is evidence that he has driven around more often before the murder in the getaway car. There are camera images, evidence Brown's debit card was used when refuelling and the data from his phone matches the movements of the car on twelve dates. Blood from Wiersum was also found in the getaway car. They were probably transferred to the car by the shooter. Brown's DNA was found on the gear lever of another car that was used for observations. The police have also intercepted messages and tapped telephone conversations. This included cleaning (of possibly the getaway car), a "cleaning ritual" that can be performed to "ward off" the minds of deceased people. Messages have also been found that point to the acquisition of weapons and a car. Brown also wanted to know, according to reports, the license plate of the car of Wiersum, because he does not just want to drive laps. Some of these messages were deleted. There is a large amount of phone conversations and messages in the hands of the OM. It also appears that Brown is making telephone contact with a phone number that has again contacted Wiersum by telephone. At the time of the murder, this telephone was close to the crime scene and disappeared completely after the murder. After the murder, Brown suddenly had a lot of money to spend. He paid off debts, gave money to his children and paid an amount of more than €15,000 in cash for a car.

According to the OM, all this facts, and the fact that he was trying to flee to Suriname, is enough evidence to hold Brown in prison for three more months. According to the OM, investigations are currently ongoing into more suspects in the murder case. "They are expected to be arrested," it sounded today. They also take into account that the murder of lawyer Derk Wiersum should have taken place the day before the actual murder, but that the perpetrators were surprised by the fact that Wiersum took the bike that day instead of taking the car to work.

On 27 January 2020, the police arrested a 31-year-old man, later named as Moreno B., from Rotterdam. He is suspected of co-perpetrating the murder and was arrested in Amsterdam. The first session against Anouar Taghi is on 4 March 2020. The judiciary is convinced that the group around Anouar Taghi delivered cars to the perpetrators of the murder, such as the Renault Mégane and the Volkswagen Transporter that appear to have been used for pre-observations. In Taghi's home the police found equipment for tracking cars and jammers, for disrupting means of communication: things that are frequently used in the harsh criminal environment, including during liquidations. The Renault Mégane, who drove at least 26 times through the street where Wiersum lived in August, was signalled during a police operation in Taghi's warehouse in Utrecht in the same month. The judiciary says Anouar Taghi ordered a few days after the murder to set the Renault Mégane on fire, the car was found burned out in Voorburg. His phone was also seen at the same location as the Renault Mégane in the weeks prior to the murder. He also had pictures on his phone of the cars used in the murder.

Because of the other investigation against Taghi, the police had placed eavesdropping equipment in his house. A few days after a broadcast of Opsporing Verzocht about the murder he had a telephone conversation with an unknown Surinamese man. In this conversation he said: 'I am wanted for the murder of Wiersum and therefore I get out of the air for a while. My DNA is found'. The Surinamese man asked him for money, but Taghi did not want to give it and became angry. The court decided to detain Anouar Taghi for at least another three months.

The first session against Moreno B. was on 1 April 2020. B. himself was not physically present because of the coronavirus. He is suspected of co-perpetrating the murder and the handling of two stolen cars. According to the OM, B. had been involved in observations and preliminary investigations around the home of Wiersum in the weeks before the murder. His DNA has been found on the passenger seat of the Opel Combo and the Volkswagen Transporter. B.'s telecom data can also be linked to the travel movements of the cars. On 11 and 16 September 2019, B.'s phone tried to contact Wiersum. He may have wanted to find out if the lawyer was at home. On 18 September, just before the murder, B.'s phone made contact with a cell tower near the crime scene. B. says he was with his mother and youngest brother on the day of the murder, his mother confirms this, but the OM doesn't believe this alibi. On 16 and 17 September, Wiersum left by bicycle instead of by car, after which the Volkswagen Transporter and the Opel Combo drove out of the street. The criminal investigation department assumes that the perpetrators were surprised by Wiersum leaving home by bicycle, and therefore postponed the murder. The court thinks that there is enough evidence extend Moreno B.'s temporary custody with 90 days. Giermo Brown's detention was also extended.

On 29 July 2020, Anouar Taghi confessed that he hired warehouses under a false name to park stolen cars together with Oussama B. and Jesse S. from Utrecht. But Taghi denies that he deliberately supplied the Renault Mégane and Volkswagen Transporter for the murder.

On 21 September 2020, all three suspects were present at the session for the first time. The OM still thinks that Moreno B. is the shooter, but B.'s lawyer says that his client does not resemble the descriptions of witnesses. The witnesses said the shooter was a young, slightly tinted slim man. But Moreno B. is not a teenager, black and muscular. CCTV footage of the murder showed that the shooter has a strange walk. This can be explained by the medical abnormality at the feet of B. All the suspects stay in prison until the next session on 8 December 2020. The fact that Brown and B. flew together to Suriname in March 2019 proves that they knew each other before the murder of Derk Wiersum.

On 2 March 2021, Anouar Taghi was released from custody, because there is not enough evidence that he was aware of the murder plans. He is still suspected of co-perpetration or complicity in the murder of Wiersum, because he allegedly supplied vehicles that were used in the preliminary reconnaissance for the murder of the lawyer. He remains in jail because in another criminal case he is suspected of leading a criminal organization with the aim of, among other things, theft and handling of vehicles.

The substantive handling of the case against Brown and B. took place between 12 July and 21 July. Anouar Taghi will be judged separately when there is enough evidence against him. Ridouan Taghi is no suspect yet in the Pulheim case. The OM sought life imprisonment for Brown and B.. Both suspects denied involvement. Derk Wiersum's father is the only one of the family asking for compensation of €20,000.

On 11 October, the court found both Moreno B. and Giërmo Brown guilty of murder and were sentenced to 30 years. Both men are expected to serve a minimum term of 28 years. The court was not able to determine beyond reasonable doubt the shooter or motive, but deems this irrelevant as the court found that evidence has shown that both men made lengthy and thorough preparations for the murder. Both men have now been convicted as the executors, but who ordered the murder of Wiersum was not made clear during the trial.

=== Appeal ===
Moreno B., Brown, and the OM appealed. With the OM petitioning for a life sentence for B. and Brown.

During the appeal in January 2023, the suspects maintained their innocence. Moreno B. showed his style of run to the court to prove he can't be the shooter, because the witnesses said the shooter had a silly walk. But the OM again seeks a life sentence for B. and Giërmo Brown.

== Aftermath ==
The prosecutor said they will keep using state witnesses, even after the murder. They have to continue using state witnesses otherwise they will get no further in criminal cases. But the prosecutor wants more options in the use of such suspects-turned-informants.

Since Wiersum's murder, a total of 20 to 30 people closely related to the Taghi case have received extra security. This includes judges and prosecutors. The level of protection varies depending on the person and the significance of their role in the case. The extra security is the installing of security cameras and the increased police presence in the neighbourhood. The people who are the closed linked to the case receive personal security provided by the Royal and Diplomatic Protection Service (DKDB). This service also offers protection for members of the Dutch royal family.

The lawyer who succeeded Derk Wiersum as a lawyer for Nabil Bakkali, who wants to stay anonymous for his own safety, already withdraws in early December 2019. He was not satisfied with the state of affairs regarding safety measures. On 3 January 2020, it was announced that Nabil Bakkali has two new lawyers. Both lawyers stay anonymous. Ridouan Taghi's lawyer, Inez Weski, objects to keeping the new lawyers anonymous. She wants to be able to check whether Bakkali explains from his own knowledge, or has possibly consulted with his lawyers or others. On 12 March 2020 it was announced that the two new lawyers have withdrawn. Why they quit is not clear. In February 2021, Oscar Hammerstein revealed himself as one of the anonymous lawyers. He withdrew because of security issues, neither was he meant to be the lawyer throughout the whole process.

On 29 June 2020 Peter Schouten became the new lawyer of the state witness. On short term Bakkali will get a second lawyer. Peter R. de Vries becomes the confidential counselor and the spokesman of Bakkali and his family. On 10 July 2020, Onno de Jong was announced as the second lawyer of Bakkali. De Jong specializes in assisting state witnesses.

One year after the murder, Minister of Justice and Security Ferdinand Grapperhaus came with the proposal to punish threats against lawyers, public prosecutors and judges with a maximum of four years in prison. Grapperhaus said about the lawyers, public prosecutors and judges: 'They play an indispensable role in our rule of law. These functions are crucial to independent justice. Any attempt of intimidation and threat is unacceptable.'

In December 2020, the NCTV told lawyers Peter Schouten and Onno de Jong they are on a death list, because of their role in the Marengo process. Both lawyers will continue their job. Crime reporter and confidential counselor Peter R. de Vries is also in danger.

On 6 July 2021, Peter R. de Vries, the confidential counselor and the spokesman of Bakkali and his family, was murdered. He was shot when he exited the TV studio of RTL Boulevard in Amsterdam. Shortly after the shooting two suspects were arrested. One of the suspects, the presumed shooter, is linked to Ridouan Taghi. Peter R. de Vries was brought in critical condition to a hospital, he died on 15 July.

=== Reactions ===
- Prime Minister Mark Rutte: "Very disturbing reports." Later he said: "Organised crime is not making it easy for us. This is a complicated fight, but one that we can win."
- Minister of Justice and Security Ferdinand Grapperhaus: "An attack on our rule of law".
- Party leader of D66 Rob Jetten: "A shocking assassination. This is an attempt by the underworld to intimidate, to undermine the rule of law. That is completely unacceptable we have to crack down on this. Minister Grapperhaus has to explain."
- Mayor of Amsterdam Femke Halsema: "A horrible murder that affects the essence of the rule of law. This is a horrible murder, of a father, a lawyer, an Amsterdammer. This leads to anxiety and unrest among lawyers."
- The Dutch association of criminal law attorneys NVJSA: "Derk Wiersum was a very sympathetic, good and solid colleague. If this is connected to the process, which it seems to be, this would be the umpteenth step in the spiral of violence attached to this process. It is really terrible."
- Police chief Erik Akerboom: "With this brutal murder, a new limit has been crossed: now even people simply doing their work no longer seem safe."
- IBAHRI Anne Ramberg: "The attacks on lawyers and other members of the judiciary threaten the rule of law and should not be tolerated. Every individual has a right to a fair trial, and this includes the right to legal representation. Defence lawyers are performing a much needed function and should not be associated with their clients."

== See also ==
- Killing of Peter R. de Vries
