= Matthijs Kleyn =

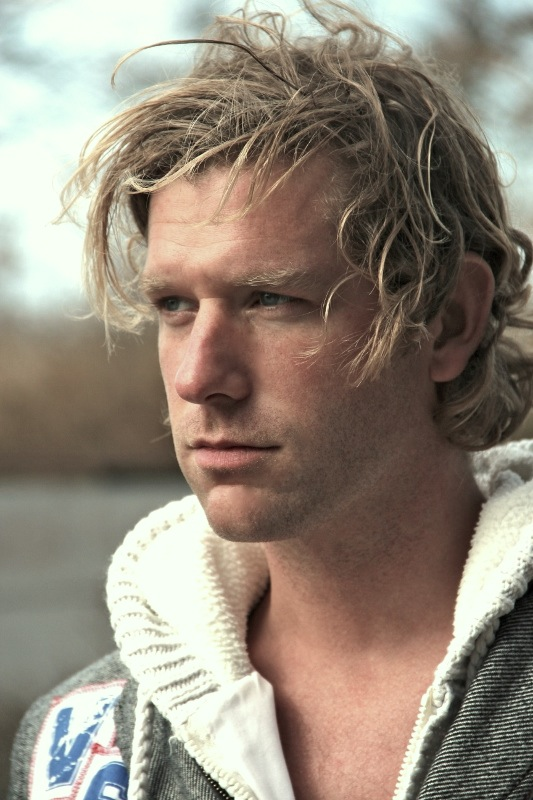
Matthijs Kleyn

Matthijs Leonard Kleyn (born 24 June 1979 in Leiden) is a Dutch television presenter, novelist, and tabloid journalist.

In December 2006 Kleyn made headlines all over the world when Eddie Murphy told him in an interview for RTL Boulevard the unborn baby of Mel B is not Murphy's child. Representatives for Mel B later announced in People that a DNA test had confirmed that Murphy was the father.

Kleyn currently works for the Dutch TV show De Wereld Draait Door.

He's also the author of Vita, a Dutch novel which takes place in Amsterdam. It's about a girl, named Vita, who has depression and asks her boyfriend to help her commit suicide.
