= Leidseplein =

Square in Amsterdam, Netherlands

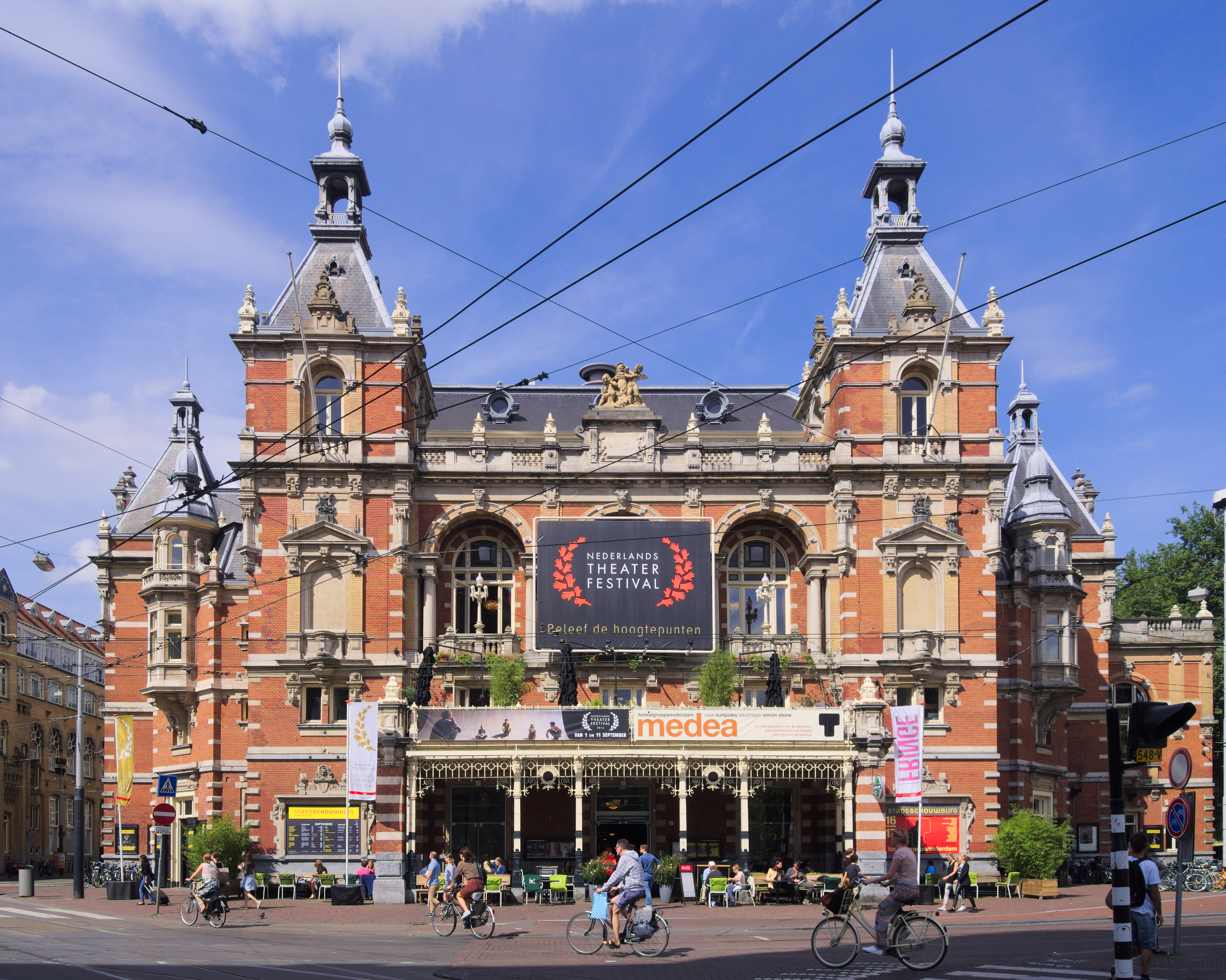
- The Stadsschouwburg on Leidseplein

- Location within Amsterdam
- Namesake: Leiden
- Location: Centrum, Amsterdam, Netherlands
- Nearest metro station: Vijzelgracht
- Coordinates: 52.364242°N 4.882978°E

Leidseplein (English: Leiden Square) is a square in central Amsterdam, Netherlands. It is in the Weteringschans neighbourhood (Centrum borough), immediately northeast of the Singelgracht. It is located on the crossroads of the Weteringschans, Marnixstraat and Leidsestraat.

== Leiden Square ==
Leidseplein is one of the busiest centres for nightlife in the city. Historically, the square was the end of the road from Leiden; it served as a parking lot for horse-drawn traffic. Today, modern traffic travels through the square, and its side streets are packed with restaurants and nightclubs. The Stadsschouwburg, a nationally renowned theatre, is the most notable architectural landmark on the square; the American Hotel is close by.

== Notable events ==
=== Peter R. de Vries murder ===
Leidseplein is approximately 250 m (270 yd) from where well-known crime reporter Peter R. de Vries, a key figure in the Marengo trial coverage, was murdered in July 2021.

=== 2022 hostage crisis ===
On 22 February 2022, a 27-year-old gunman took multiple persons hostage inside an Apple Store in Leidseplein. After a forced breach of the store by Dutch police, all the hostages were safely rescued. However, as a result of the intervention, the hostage-taker was killed. The 2025 Dutch film iHostage dramatises the incident.

== Panorama ==
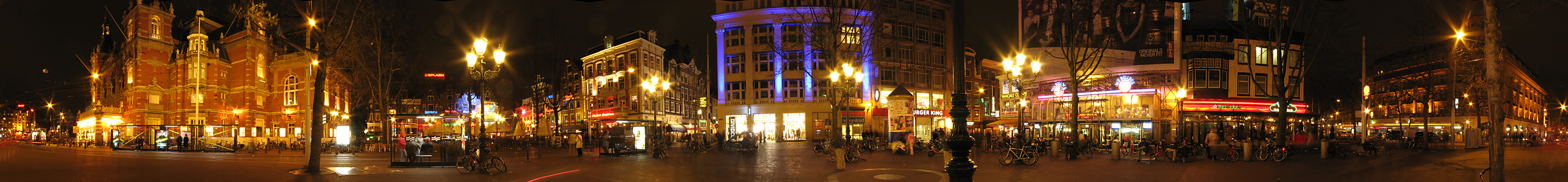
Panorama of Leidseplein at night, with the Stadsschouwburg theatre on the far left of the photograph

== See also ==
- List of tourist attractions in Amsterdam
