= Murder of Peter R. de Vries =

Murder of crime reporter Peter R. de Vries

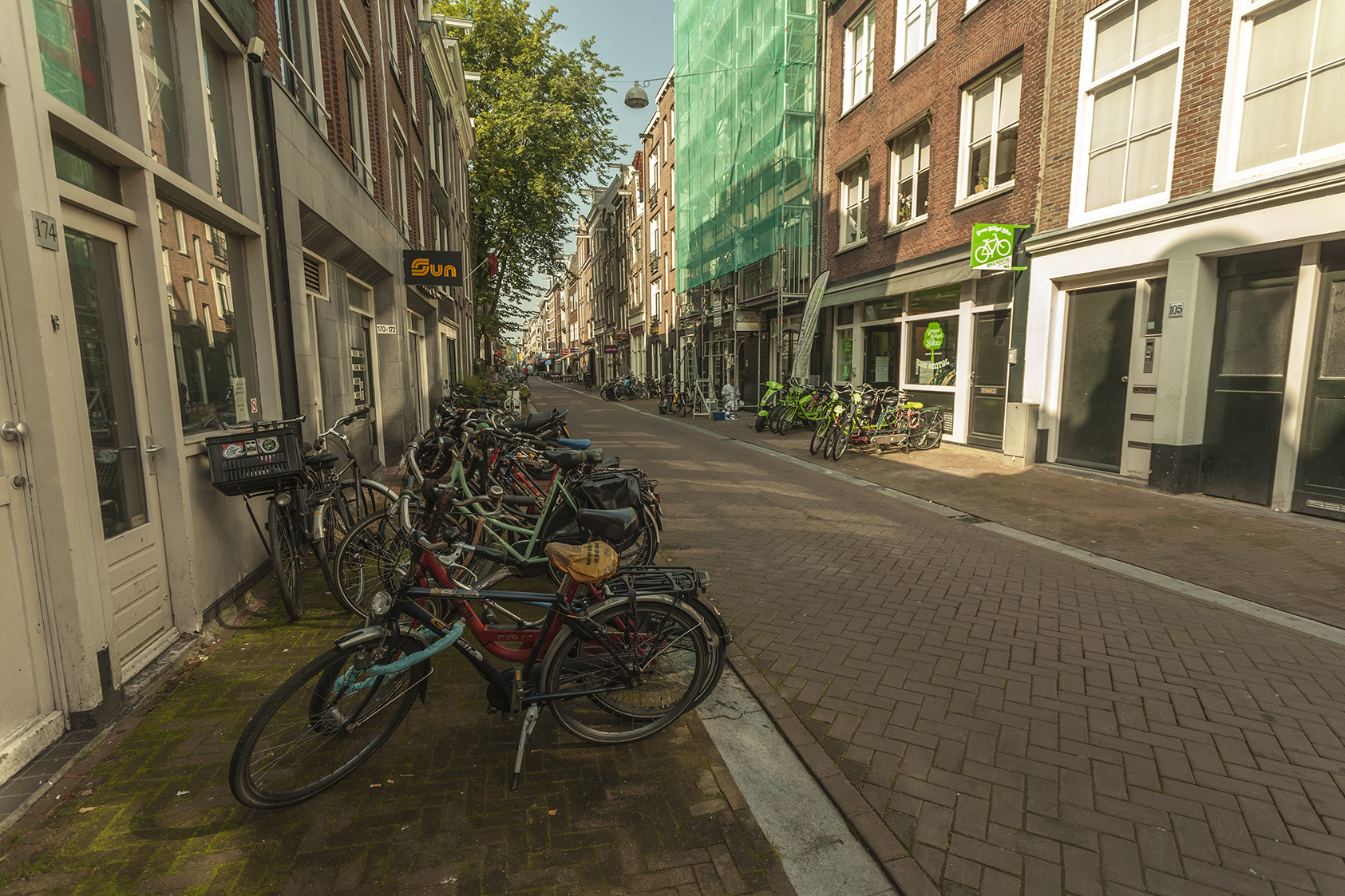
- Lange Leidsedwarsstraat, the street where the shooting took place (not the exact location)

- Murder of Peter R. de Vries (Amsterdam)
- Location: 52°21′50″N 4°53′05″E; Lange Leidsedwarsstraat, Amsterdam, Netherlands
- Date: 6 July 2021; 5 years ago c. 19:30 (CEST)
- Attack type: Murder by shooting, assassination
- Victim: Peter R. de Vries
- Perpetrator: Delano Geerman Kamil Egiert Krystian M.
- Assailant: Delano Geerman

On the evening of 6 July 2021, Dutch investigative journalist and crime reporter Peter R. de Vries was shot in the head after leaving the television studio of RTL Boulevard in Amsterdam, where he had appeared as a guest. Several shots were fired at him in the Lange Leidsedwarsstraat, near the Leidseplein, while he was walking to his car. De Vries was taken to the VU University Medical Center in critical condition. He died of his injuries on 15 July.

== Background ==
Peter R. de Vries was a television personality and the best-known crime reporter in the Netherlands. He gained national prominence with his own television program Peter R. de Vries: Crime Reporter. Throughout his career, he reported on high-profile criminal cases such as the kidnapping of Freddy Heineken, the disappearance of Natalee Holloway, the murder of Marianne Vaatstra, as well as other murder cases, scandals and wrongful convictions. His novel based on his investigation into Heineken's kidnapping was later adapted as Kidnapping Freddy Heineken (2015), starring Anthony Hopkins as Freddy Heineken.

Later in his career, De Vries became one of the most visible figures in the journalistic investigation of cold cases in the Netherlands, such as the death of Nicky Verstappen, in which he supported the victim's family in court. He was also a frequent guest on talk shows and embarked on a short political career with his own political party. A central theme in his later work was his fight against what he saw as injustice.

In 2021 De Vries supported Crown witness Nabil B. in the Marengo trial. Less than two years earlier B.'s lawyer, Derk Wiersum, had been murdered outside his home in Amsterdam.

== Investigation ==
The Dutch police arrested three suspects that same evening. Two suspects were in a car that was stopped on the A4 motorway near Leidschendam. The third person was released the next day, and is no longer a suspect. As of 15 July 2021, a 35-year-old Polish man identified as Kamil Egiert (born 1986 in Poland) from Maurik is the suspected getaway car driver, while a 21-year-old man and aspiring rapper known as Delano Geerman from Rotterdam (born 3 September 1999 in Tiel) is the suspected shooter. In 2017, Geerman was sentenced to juvenile detention for street robberies, Geerman spent several months in the Hunnerberg juvenile detention center in Nijmegen. Dutch media has reported that the suspected killer is the nephew or cousin of one of the henchmen of gangster Ridouan Taghi. De Vries was involved in the prosecution of Taghi.

The trial against the two suspects opened in Amsterdam in June 2022. In June 2024, the Amsterdam Criminal Court sentenced three men to prison sentences of up to 28 years for the murder of Peter R. de Vries. Four other defendants were also sentenced to prison terms of up to 14 years for aiding and abetting. Two defendants were acquitted because they had only been accused of participating in a criminal organisation, which the court believed could not be proven.

Shooter Delano Geerman and driver Kamil Egiert were sentenced to 28 years in prison. The third main perpetrator, Krystian M. (29), is considered a "murder broker". He was sentenced to 26 years in prison. He was the only one that admitted to his complicity and apologised to de Vries's relatives.

== Aftermath ==
=== Reactions ===
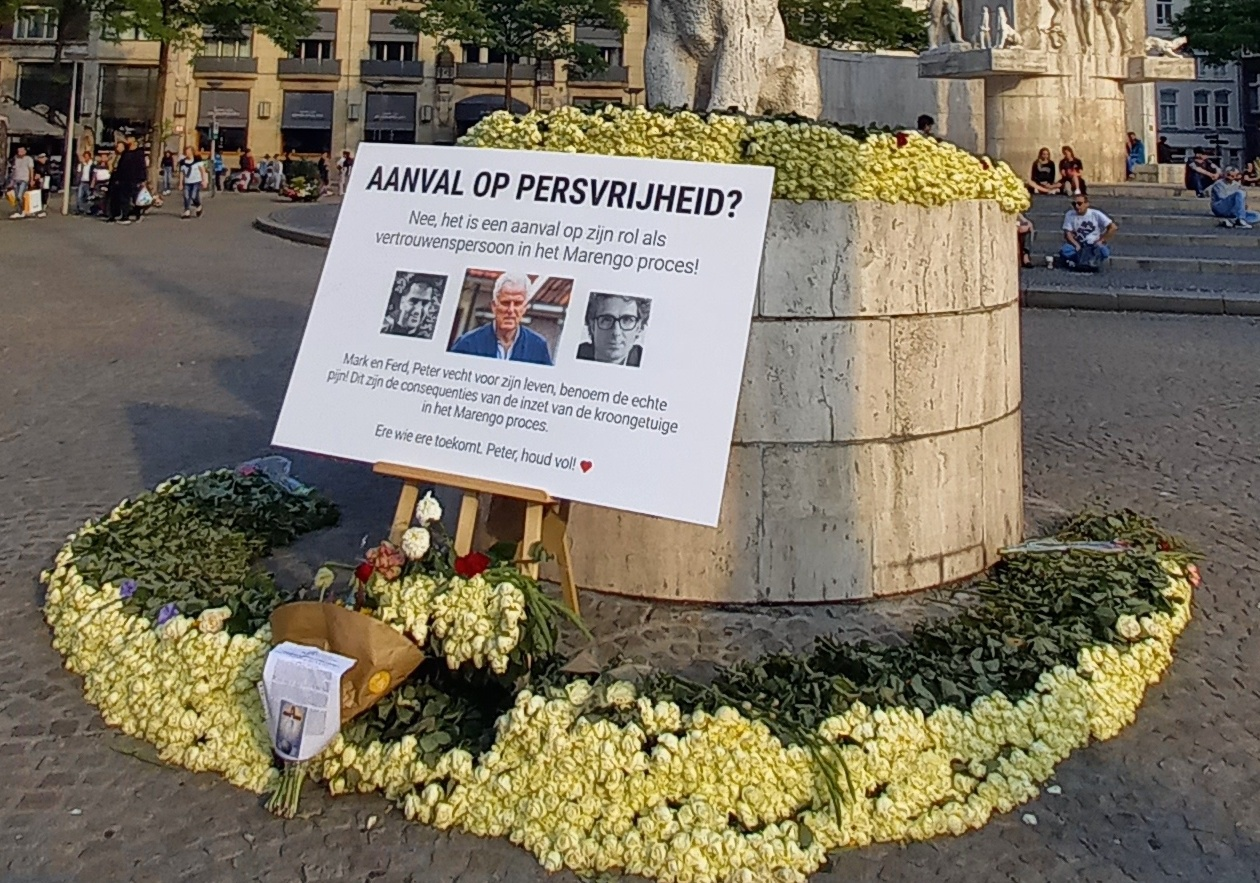
Flowers at Dam Square, Amsterdam after the shooting. The text reads "Attack on the freedom of press? No, an attack on his involvement with the Marengo trial!"

King Willem-Alexander of the Netherlands called it an attack on journalism and an attack on the rechtsstaat (rule of law). On the evening of the attack, Amsterdam mayor Femke Halsema, chief public prosecutor René de Beukelaer and police chief Frank Paauw held a press conference. Halsema spoke of a "brutal cowardly crime". Prime Minister Mark Rutte and Minister of Justice Ferdinand Grapperhaus also held a press conference. Rutte called it an attack on free journalism. The attack "affects journalists and damages our society", according to Grapperhaus. The Dutch Association of Journalists stated: "This hits journalism right in the heart." Ursula von der Leyen, President of the European Commission, expressed her condolences and expressed her support for the Dutch authorities to bring the perpetrators to justice.

After the death of De Vries, Rutte stated that "We owe it to Peter R. de Vries to ensure that justice is served". Many people have reacted to the attack and his death, including many members of the Dutch House of Representatives and members of the European Parliament. Crime reporter John van den Heuvel stated that "[De Vries] will always remain an example and a source of inspiration".

=== Security debate ===
De Vries was frequently threatened, but was reported as not wanting any police protection or private security. However, there was criticism that he could have been protected better. He had a tattoo on his leg with his motto On bended knee is no way to be free. He explained the tattoo as "It means that we are not subservient to anyone. That no one can dominate us. That means that we are never, ever, anyone's slave."

The caretaker Minister of Justice and Security, Ferd Grapperhaus, commissioned an independent investigation into the security of De Vries. His partner, Tahmina Akefi, said that his murder could have been prevented and that the system failed them. She also denied reports that De Vries did not want security.

== See also ==
- Murder of Derk Wiersum
