= Saïd Razzouki =

Moroccan-Dutch criminal

Saïd Razzouki is a member of Mocro Maffia, a gang of Moroccan-Dutch criminals. As of 8 February 2020, he was thought to be the adjutant of Ridouan Taghi and suspected of involvement in several murders. The Netherlands offered €100,000 ($110,000 at that time) for information on his whereabouts, an amount equal to information on his close partner Taghi. This was the highest amount ever offered by the Dutch government for such information.

After fleeing to Colombia, where he managed to hide for multiple years and enjoyed the protection of the cartel Clan del Golfo, he was arrested by a combined effort of FBI, DEA and Colombian police forces. He was extradited to the Netherlands in December 2021. On February 27, 2024, Saïd Razzouki was sentenced to life imprisonment for his role in ten murders.
