= RTL Boulevard =

Dutch television show

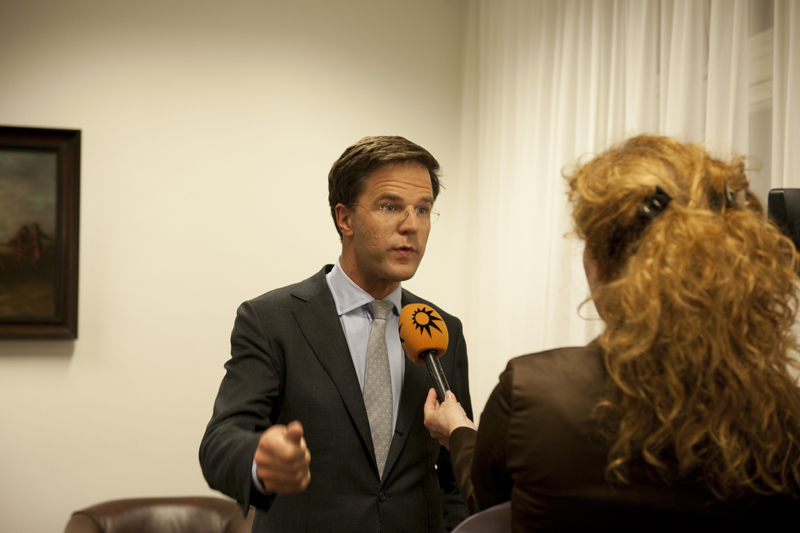
RTL Boulevard journalist interviews Mark Rutte, prime minister of the Netherlands.

RTL Boulevard is a daily television programme on the Dutch TV channel RTL 4. It was set up as a television equivalent of a tabloid, with a lot of airy subjects, news items and gossip about the stars, fashion and criminality.

== History ==
From the beginning in 2001, Beau van Erven Dorens was the main presenter. He was supported by his co-presenter Albert Verlinde and a daily rotating "expert". On 1 April 2005 Beau Van Erven Dorens moved to Talpa and Daphne Bunskoek (formerly a presenter of the morning program in the Netherlands Public Broadcasting) has taken over his place. When Daphne Bunskoek also left the show, she was replaced by Winston Gerschtanowitz and Humberto Tan.

Regular returning co-presenters were/are:

- Fiona Hering (fashion/lifestyle)
- John van den Heuvel (crime)
- Irene van de Laar (fashion/lifestyle)
- Marc van der Linden (royalty)
- Abraham Moszkowicz (crime, law)
- Peter van der Vorst (royalty)
- Peter R. de Vries (crime)
- Marieke Elsinga

On 16 November 2006, Dutch prime-minister Jan-Peter Balkenende got his chance at executive editing and presenting the program, in the run-up to the 2006 general elections.

In December 2006 the show made headlines all over the world when Eddie Murphy told reporter Matthijs Kleyn the unborn baby of Mel B is not his. A blood test showed him wrong.

On 6 July 2021, Dutch investigative journalist and crime reporter Peter R. de Vries was shot in the head after leaving the television studio of RTL Boulevard in Amsterdam, Netherlands. The show's live broadcast of 9 July was cancelled due to concerns for an attack on the studio. The show of 10 July was cancelled by RTL Nederland. Since then, the show broadcasts from a studio located at Media Park in Hilversum, Netherlands. De Vries died on 15 July 2021.
