= List of Dutch people of Moroccan descent =

The following is a referenced list of notable Dutch people of Moroccan descent. Some of the people listed below are immigrants; others are of the second generation. Large-scale immigration to the Netherlands started on 14 May 1969, when the Netherlands and Morocco signed a treaty allowing recruitment of mostly unschooled labourers to work in Dutch mining, industry, construction and agriculture. Most guest workers intended to earn lots of money in a relatively short period and then return home. The fact that their number has risen to over 335,000 people, or over 2 percent of the Dutch population, proves many changed their minds. When the 1973 oil crisis hit the Netherlands, demand for labour greatly diminished and many guest workers lost their jobs.

Before the 1990s, immigration policy was a taboo in the Netherlands, leaving many social problems of immigrants undealt with. Today the situation seems to be getting better, with many prominent Moroccans achieving success in sports (e.g. football player Khalid Boulahrouz), music (e.g. singer Hind Laroussi) and politics (e.g. Rotterdam mayor Ahmed Aboutaleb).

== List ==
Name	Life	Notability	Link to Morocco	Photo
Ahmed Salah Abdelfatah	1949–	actor	immigrant from Morocco	
Yassine Abdellaoui	1975–	footballer (retired)	Dutch-born to Moroccan parents	
Laïla Abid	1977–	journalist, presenter, news anchor	immigrant from Meknes	
Ahmed Aboutaleb	1961–	politician; incumbent mayor of Rotterdam (Labour Party)	immigrant from Beni Sidel	
Ibrahim Afellay	1986–	footballer (FC Barcelona), Dutch international	Dutch-born to Moroccan parents	
Achmed Ahahaoui	1983–	footballer (Go Ahead Eagles)	Dutch-born to Moroccan parents	
Karim El Ahmadi	1985–	footballer (Feyenoord), Moroccan international	Dutch-born to Moroccan parents	
Ismaïl Aissati	1988–	footballer (AFC Ajax)	Dutch-born to Moroccan parents	
Jamal Akachar	1982–	footballer (Moghreb Tétouan)	Dutch-born to Moroccan parents	
Youssef El Akchaoui	1981–	footballer (NEC Nijmegen)	Dutch-born to Moroccan parents	
Achmed Akkabi	1983–	actor and presenter	Dutch-born to Moroccan parents	
Esmaa Alariachi	1979–	presenter	Dutch-born to Moroccan parents	
Hajar Alariachi	1986–	presenter	Dutch-born to Moroccan parents	
Jihad Alariachi	1984–	presenter	Dutch-born to Moroccan parents	
Najib Amhali	1971–	comedian and actor	immigrant from Nador	
Ahmed Ammi	1981–	footballer (ADO Den Haag)	immigrant from Temsaman	
Nordin Amrabat	1987–	footballer (PSV Eindhoven)	Dutch-born to Moroccan parents	
Khadija Arib	1960–	politician; MP (Labour Party)	immigrant from Hedami	
Oussama Assaidi	1988–	footballer (De Graafschap)	immigrant from Beni-Boughafer	
Mohammed Azaay	1976–	actor	immigrant from Tétouan	
Farid Azarkan	1971–	politician	immigrant from Ighmiren	
Malik Azmani	1976–	politician	Moroccan father	
Naïma Azough	1972–	politician; MP (GreenLeft Party)	immigrant from Asdif	
Tarik Azzougarh (Cilvaringz)	1979–	rapper and hip hop producer, Wu-Tang Clan affiliate	Dutch-born to Moroccan parents	
Samir Azzouz	1986–	terrorist and Islamist	Dutch-born to Moroccan parents	
Hassan Bahara	1978–	writer	immigrant from Teroua n'Aït Izou	
Otman Bakkal	1985–	footballer (PSV Eindhoven)	Dutch-born to Moroccan parents	
Said Bakkati	1982–	footballer (Go Ahead Eagles)	Dutch-born to Moroccan parents	
Nacer Barazite	1990–	footballer (Arsenal F.C.)	Dutch-born to Moroccan father	
Rachid Belkacem	1973–2006	terrorism suspect (acquitted)	Dutch national of Moroccan descent	
Abdelkader Benali	1975–	writer and journalist	immigrant from Ighazzazen	
Walid Benmbarek	1980–	actor	One Moroccan grandparent on each side	
Mohammed Benzakour	1972–	columnist, essayist, poet, politician, writer	immigrant from Nador	
Naima El Bezaz	1974–	writer, essayist, journalist	immigrant from Meknes	
Ali Bouali (Ali B)	1981–	rapper, presenter and occasional comedian	Dutch-born to Moroccan parents	
Rachid Bouaouzan	1984–	footballer (Wigan Athletic)	Dutch-born to Moroccan parents	
Hafid Bouazza	1970–	writer	immigrant from Oujda	
Hassnae Bouazza	1973–	journalist, columnist, writer, translator, TV programme-maker	immigrant from Oujda	
Elbekay Bouchiba	1978–	footballer (Al-Wakra)	Dutch-born to Moroccan parents	
Nourdin Boukhari	1980–	footballer (NAC Breda), Moroccan international	Dutch-born to Moroccan parents	
Khalid Boulahrouz	1981–	footballer (VfB Stuttgart), Dutch international	Dutch-born to Moroccan parents	
Nadia Bouras	1981–	historian	Dutch-born to Moroccan parents	
Ali Boussaboun	1979–	footballer (FC Utrecht), Moroccan international	immigrant from Tangier	
Dries Boussatta	1972–	footballer (retired), Dutch+Moroccan international	Dutch-born to Moroccan parents	
Mbark Boussoufa	1984–	footballer (RSC Anderlecht), Moroccan international	Dutch-born to Moroccan parents	
Saïd Boutahar	1982–	footballer (Willem II Tilburg)	Dutch-born to Moroccan parents	
Mohammed Bouyeri	1978–	terrorist and Islamist, murderer of filmmaker Theo van Gogh	Dutch-born to Moroccan parents	
Mohammed Chaara	1980–	actor	Dutch-born to Moroccan parents	
Faldir Chahbari	1979–	martial artist and welterweight kickboxer	immigrant from Ijarmawas	
Abdelhali Chaiat	1983–	footballer (De Graafschap)	immigrant from Saka	
Dr Oussama Cherribi	1959–	politician; MP (VVD), academic (PhD social sciences)	immigrant from Kenitra	
Abdellah Dami	1982–	presenter, journalist, writer	Dutch-born to Moroccan parents Dutch-born to Moroccan parents	
Nasrdin Dchar	1978–	actor and presenter	Dutch-born to Moroccan parents	
Anouar Diba	1983–	footballer (Al-Wakrah)	Dutch-born to Moroccan parents	
Tofik Dibi	1980–	politician; MP (Greenleft Party)	Dutch-born to Moroccan parents	
Salah Edin	1980–	rapper	Dutch-born to Moroccan parents	
Mamoun Elyounoussi	1988–	actor	Dutch national of Moroccan descent	
Karim Fachtali	1988–	footballer (TOP Oss)	immigrant from Beni Said	
Nouredine el Fahtni	1982–	terrorist and Islamist	immigrant from Midar	
Mohammed Faouzi	1987–	footballer (SBV Excelsior)	Dutch-born to Moroccan parents	
Brahim Fouradi	1985–	rapper, presenter	Dutch-born to Moroccan parents	
Mohamed Fouradi	1982–	rapper, presenter	Dutch-born to Moroccan parents	
Samir El Gaaouiri	1984–	footballer (VVV-Venlo)	Dutch-born to Moroccan parents	
Rachid El Ghazoui (Appa)	1983–	rapper	Dutch-born to Moroccan parents	
Chahid Oulad El Hadj	1988–	martial artist and welterweight Muay Thai kickboxer	Dutch-born to Moroccan parents	
Wassila Hachchi	1980–	politician	Dutch-born to Moroccan parents	
Anouar Hadouir	1982–	footballer (Roda JC)	Dutch-born to Moroccan parents	
Mounir El Hamdaoui	1984–	footballer (AZ Alkmaar)	Dutch-born to Moroccan parents	
Touriya Haoud	1977–	actor, singer, model and Playmate	Dutch-born to Moroccan father	
Dr Sadik Harchaoui	1973–	academic (PhD law), civil servant, manager	immigrant from Douar Khababa	
Badr Hari	1984–	martial artist and heavyweight kickboxer	Dutch-born to Moroccan parents	
Maryam Hassouni	1985–	actor, known for her Emmy Award-winning role in Offers	Dutch-born to Moroccan parents	
Saadia Himi	1984–	model, Miss Netherlands Earth 2004	Dutch-born to Moroccan parents	
Fouad Idabdelhay	1988–	footballer (NAC Breda)	Dutch-born to Moroccan parents	
Moestafa El Kabir	1988–	footballer (NEC Nijmegen)	immigrant from Targuist	
Ali El Khattabi	1977–	footballer (retired), Moroccan international	Dutch-born to Moroccan parents	
Prof Fouad Laroui	1958–	writer and academic (PhD in econometrics)	immigrant from Oujda	
Hind Laroussi (Hind)	1984–	singer, Idols Netherlands contestant	Dutch-born to Moroccan father	
Nassir Maachi	1985–	footballer (Cambuur Leeuwarden)	Dutch-born to Moroccan parents	
Adam Maher	1993–	footballer, Dutch international	immigrant from Ait Izzou	
Ahmed Marcouch	1969–	politician	immigrant from Morocco	
Mourad Mghizrat	1974–	footballer (Haaglandia)	immigrant from Fes	
Mohammed Mohandis	1985–	politician	Dutch-born to Moroccan parents	
Rajae El Mouhandiz	1979–	singer, recording artist, producer and poet	immigrant from Larache	
Khalil el-Moumni	1941–	imam	immigrant from Beni Mansour	
Samir El Moussaoui	1986–	footballer (ADO Den Haag)	Dutch-born to Moroccan parents	
Mimoun Oaïssa	1975–	actor and screenwriter	Iimigrant from Beni Said	
Mimoun Ouled Radi	1977–	actor	Dutch-born to Moroccan parents	
Tarik Oulida	1974–	footballer (retired)	Dutch-born to Moroccan parents	
Mohamed Rabbae	1941–	politician; alderman and MP (GreenLeft Party), activist	immigrant from Berrechid	
R.R.C. Rensen (Raymzter)	1979–	rapper	Dutch-born to Moroccan father	
Khalid Sinouh	1975–	footballer (HSV), Moroccan international	Dutch-born to Moroccan parents	
Karim Touzani	1980–	footballer (Sparta Rotterdam)	Dutch-born to Moroccan parents	

== See also ==
- Demographics of the Netherlands
- Foreign worker
- List of Dutch people
- List of Moroccan people
- Moroccan diaspora
- Moroccans in the Netherlands
