= Piranha court case =

The Piranha court case (Dutch: Piranhazaak) is a trial of an Islamist terror group — 'Piranha group' — which was a direct successor to the 2002-2004 Hofstadgroup.

== Piranha case ==
On December 1, 2006, the District Court of Rotterdam, sitting in 'de Bunker' in Amsterdam Nieuw-West, convicted Samir Azzouz of preparing a terrorist attack and sentenced him to 8 years in prison. Nouriddin El Fahtni and Mohammed Chentouf were sentenced to 4 years in prison, Soumaya Sahla was sentenced to 3 years in prison and Brahim Harhour was sentenced to 3 months in prison. The Court ruled that the six individuals had not formed a terrorist organization.

The defendants lodged appeal with the Court of Appeal in The Hague.

On 2 October 2008 the Court of Appeal sentenced all suspects to higher sentences than those given by the District Court of Rotterdam: Samir Azzouz got 9 years in prison, Nouriddin El Fahtni got 8 years, Mohammed Chentouf got 6 years and Soumaya Sahla was sentenced to 4 years in prison.

Samir Azzouz was released on 6 September 2013. (On 31 August 2022 he — and others — was convicted again for helping Dutch IS women to escape from camps in Syria. )

== Piranha II case ==
After the witnesses Lahbib B. and his wife Hanan S. had testified against the defendants in the Piranha case, they were prosecuted themselves. They were charged with participating in a terrorist organization, the preparation of attacks and the possession of several firearms. The District Court of Rotterdam sentenced them to 3 years in prison. The Court of Appeal in The Hague reduced these sentences to 104 days (Lahbib B.) and 74 days (Hanan S.).

== Court rulings (Piranah case) ==
Samir Azzouz
01–12–2006	10-600052-05 en 10–600100–06	ECLI:NL:RBROT:2006:AZ3589	8 years
22–07–2009		ECLI:NL:GHSGR:2009:BJ3346	
02–10–2008		GHSGR	9 years
28–08–2013	99/000089-44	ECLI:NL:RBROT:2013:6691	
Mohammed Chentouf
01–12–2006	10-600108-05 en 10–600101–06	ECLI:NL:RBROT:2006:AZ3589	4 years
02–10–2008	22–007384–06	ECLI:NL:GHSGR:2008:BF5180	6;6 years
Nouriddin El Fahtni
01–12–2006	10-600134-05 en 10–600102–06	ECLI:NL:RBROT:2006:AZ3589	4 years
02–10–2008	22–007349–06	ECLI:NL:GHSGR:2008:BF3987	8 years
02-10-2008	10-000354-04 (22-000553-07)	ECLI:NL:GHSGR:2008:BF3987	(8 years)
15-11-2011	10-000354-04 (08/04272)	ECLI:NL:HR:2011:BP7585	7;4 years
[Suspect]
01–12–2006	10-600109-05 en 10–600103–06	ECLI:NL:RBROT:2006:AZ3589	acquitted
02–10–2008	22–007350–06	ECLI:NL:GHSGR:2008:BF5225	3 months
Brahim Harhour
01–12–2006	10-600122-05 en 10–600104–06	ECLI:NL:RBROT:2006:AZ3589	3 months
Soumaya Sahla
01–12–2006	10–600023–06, 10-600093-06 en 10-600046-05 (TUL)	ECLI:NL:RBROT:2006:AZ3589	3 years
02–10–2008	22–007351–06	ECLI:NL:GHSGR:2008:BF4814	4 years
15–11–2011	08/04418	ECLI:NL:HR:2011:BP7544	
21–09–2012	23–005318–11	ECLI:NL:GHAMS:2012:BY2772	
21–12–2012	23–005318–11	ECLI:NL:GHAMS:2012:BY9310	
25–03–2014	23–005318–11	ECLI:NL:GHAMS:2014:915	3 years
16–02–2016	14/02720	ECLI:NL:HR:2016:241	

== Court rulings (Piranah II case) ==
Lahbib B.
25–03–2008	10–600111–05	ECLI:NL:RBROT:2008:BC7531	3 years
11–11–2009	22–001605–08	ECLI:NL:GHSGR:2009:BK2957	104 days
06–12–2011	10/01721	ECLI:NL:HR:2011:BR1146	
25–03–2014	23–005454–11	ECLI:NL:GHAMS:2014:914	104 days
Hanan S.
25–03–2008	10–600112–05	ECLI:NL:RBROT:2008:BC7539	3 years
11–11–2009	22–001599–08	ECLI:NL:GHSGR:2009:BK2888	74 days
06–12–2011	10/01718	ECLI:NL:HR:2011:BR1144	
25–03–2014	23–005455–11	ECLI:NL:GHAMS:2014:905	74 days

== See also ==
- Hofstad Network
