= Inez Weski =

Dutch criminal lawyer

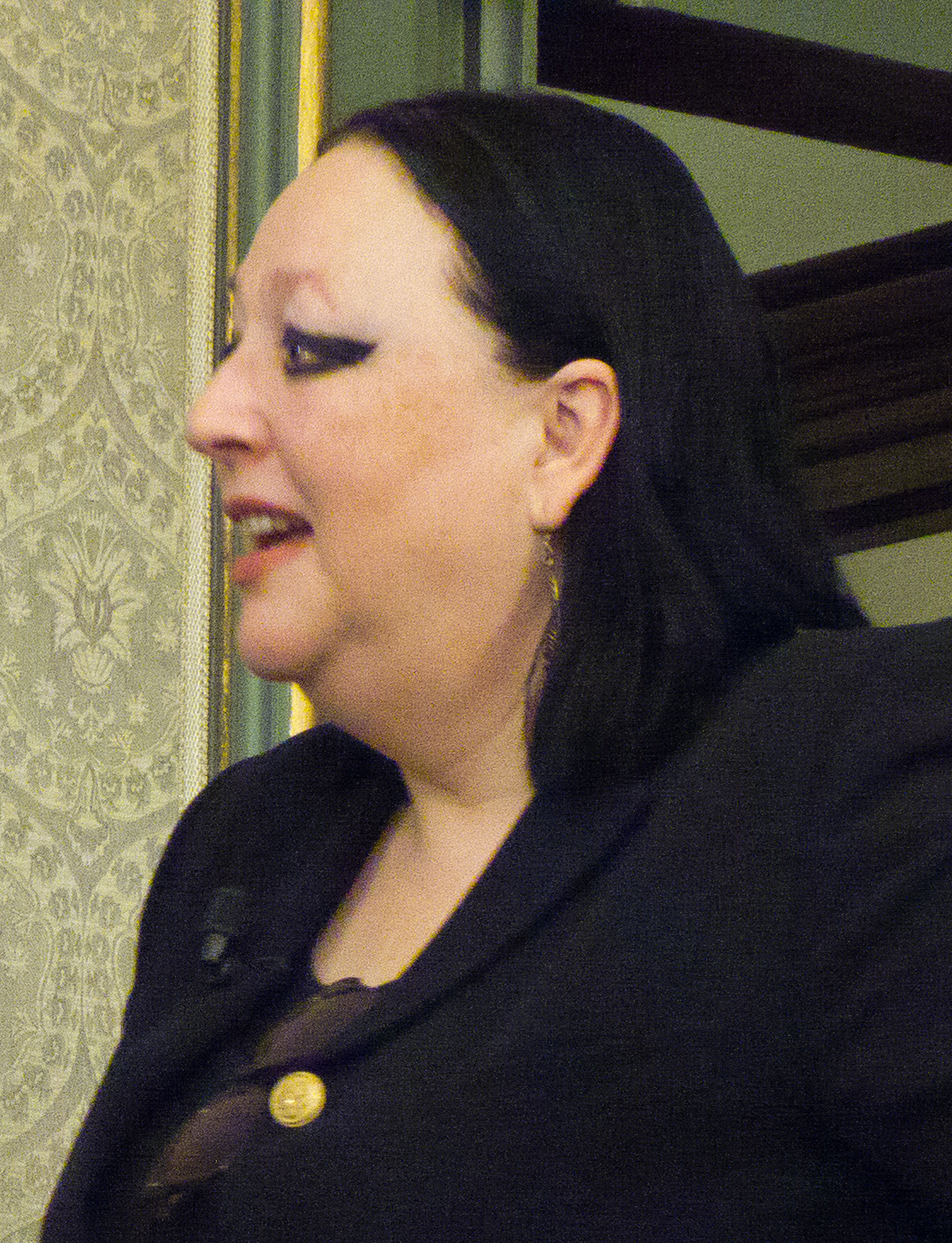
- Inez Weski 2011
- Born: Inez Natali Weski; 10 February 1955 (age 71); Rotterdam
- Occupation: Criminal lawyer

Inez Natali Weski (born 10 February 1955) is a retired Dutch criminal lawyer. She has defended among others Desi Bouterse, Guus Kouwenhoven, and, during the Marengo trial, Ridouan Taghi.

== Early life and education ==
Weski was born in Rotterdam, and grew up as the youngest in a large family. In the 1960s they lived in Israel for some years. She finished her studies in private and administrative law in her birthplace of Rotterdam in 1976.

== Career ==
Inez worked in the Ministry of Health for two years before becoming a lawyer in 1978, working for her sister's law firm Weski Heinrici Advocaten.

She established her reputation defending controversial figures like Surinamese military officer, politician and drugs baron Desi Bouterse, weapons smuggler and war criminal Guus Kouwenhoven and Sister P., a Chinese human trafficker.

=== Marengo trial ===
In 2019 Weski began work as the defense lawyer for Ridouan Taghi as part of the Marengo trial. Taghi is a Moroccan-Dutch criminal who became a prime suspect in at least ten murders related to organised crime, drug trafficking and leading a criminal organisation. On February 27, 2024, he was convicted and sentenced to life imprisonment.

In October 2019 Weski stopped working for Taghi, and she insisted this was done with his support and not due to any fear of him. However after his arrest in Dubai in December 2019 and return to the Netherlands and imprisonment in a maximum security facility in Vught, she once again took on his defense. Those who knew her believed she was being coerced by Taghi, and there were rumors she was receiving other criminal suspects from his organisation who were not her clients at her office.

Youssef Taghi, the nephew of Riduoan, was arrested in October 2021 for having exchanged messages from him to those outside the prison, and had discussed plans with him for a violent escape attempt. In September 2022 Youssef's lawyer said Weski was involved in the exchange of messages, including to Riduoan's oldest son Faissal. He added that Weski was not able to withstand the pressure from him. Weski denied any involvement.

=== Prosecution and retirement ===
On 23 january 2023 Youssef was convicted to 5,5 years in prison, and in April 2023 Weski was arrested and charged with participation in a criminal organisation by exchanging messages between its members. Ten days before her arrest she had sold her law office to her son Guy Weski and formally retired.

She was detained for one month, and said she was severely mistreated and initially brought to a secret location where the public prosecutor attempted to make her a witness for their case in the Merengo trial, or have her killed. Weski's experiences during this time became the subject of her April 2024 book The sound of silence: A year living in a raging hurricane. Lawyer Peter Plasman said she was becoming increasingly paranoid and the claim the public prosecutor was attempting to have her killed was extreme and not substantiated by facts. Emeritus professor of law Peter van Koppen said while some of her claims were extreme, he assumed what she said was based in fact, and that the methods the public prosecution used against her was similar to the CIA's 'Alice in Wonderland' method of disorienting a subject by routinely changing guards and not allowing any contact, irregular food provisions, and when someone is broken offering a deal.

In January 2025 the trial against Weski began after two years of delays the public prosecution blamed on Weski's legal manoeuvres. On 21 May 2026, Weski was found guilty of participation in a criminal organisation by relaying messages between Taghi and the outside world, and sentenced to 42 days imprisonment, the same amount of time Weski had spent in pre-trial detention meaning she did not have to return to prison.
