= Jason Walters =

Dutch terrorist (born 1985)

- Born: March 6, 1985 (age 41); Amersfoort, Netherlands
- Status: Released
- Criminal charges: Terrorism, Weapon Charges
- Penalty: 15 years imprisonment

Jason Walters or Jamal (born 6 March 1985) is a Dutch citizen who was sentenced to fifteen years in prison on charges related to Islamic terrorism.

== Early life ==
Jason Walters was born on 6 March 1985 to an American soldier based in the Netherlands and a Dutch woman. His neighbors stated that he was pro-American as an adolescent.

Walters converted to Islam at 16 (some sources say 13) and later adopted the name Abu Mujahied Amrik. His mother, recently divorced, and with two younger daughters at home, felt increasingly unsafe, finally fleeing to a woman's shelter.

His talk about jihad against the non-believers caused his mosque to ban him and his brother, Jermaine Walters, and notify the authorities.

Walters has made at least one visit to Pakistan and possibly to Afghanistan where it is alleged he has received training at a terrorist training camp, and in 2003, Walters wrote a farewell letter to his mother.

== Arrest and conviction ==
Walters, at the time 19, was arrested along with Ismail Akhnikh on November 10, 2004, after a 14-hour siege in The Hague. This was one of a series of raids on suspected Muslim terrorist cells following the 2 November 2004 assassination of filmmaker Theo van Gogh by fellow Hofstad Network member Mohammed Bouyeri. Near the end of this siege, Walters threw a hand grenade at police.

According to police, Walters had his own plans to assassinate Dutch political figures he deemed anti-Muslim, and his hit list included two members of parliament, Ayaan Hirsi Ali, a native of Somalia, and Geert Wilders. Both, like van Gogh, had been outspoken critics of Islam in the Netherlands, particularly its treatment of women.

On 10 March 2006, Walters was convicted with eight others in the Netherlands on charges of terrorism. He was sentenced to fifteen years imprisonment.

== Release ==
He was released from prison in May 2013. In a first interview in 2018, he said he had become deradicalized in prison through self study, citing the works of Nietzsche, Plato and Heidegger as crucial. He also said that radicalization is an existential choice.
