= Amsterdam sex crimes case =

Child abuse case in the Netherlands

Amsterdamse zedenzaak
- Court: Gerechtshof Amsterdam
- Decided: 24 June 2012
- Citation: ECLI:NL:GHAMS:2013:BZ8885 (Appeal)

Case history
- Appealed from: Rechtbank Amsterdam ECLI:NL:RBAMS:2012:BW6148
- Appealed to: Hoge Raad (cassation)
- Subsequent actions: opinion advocate-general ECLI:NL:PHR:2014:632; decision Hoge raad ECLI:NL:HR:2014:2668

Court membership
- Judges sitting: W.M.C. Tilleman, A.M. van Woensel, N. van der Wijngaart

The Amsterdam sex crimes case (Dutch: Amsterdamse zedenzaak) is a court case involving Robert Mikelson's abuse of babies in Amsterdam, the Netherlands. The defendant Mikelson, dubbed "the Monster of Riga" by the Dutch press, had worked at several daycare centres in Amsterdam and was accused of abusing 87 children as well as possession, production and distribution of child pornography. Mikelson was found guilty and sentenced to 18 years and 11 months in prison, followed by involuntary commitment.

== Identification and arrest ==
The case of convicted sex offender Roberts Mikelson (Latvian: Roberts Miķelsons) started in December 2010 with the broadcast in the Netherlands on the television show Opsporing Verzocht ("Investigation Requested") of images originating from the United States of Mikelson and an unnamed child with a stuffed toy known as Miffy (Dutch: Nijntje). As Miffy is originally a Dutch product, the investigators suspected the child to be Dutch. After the boy's grandfather realised the boy was his grandson, the police were directed to the child's babysitter, Robert Mikelson. During a search of his house, computers containing a large collection of child pornography (46,803 photos and 3,672 movies, part of which had been unsuccessfully deleted during the broadcast) were found and seized.

== Defendants ==
Per Dutch journalism etiquette, for privacy reasons names in criminal cases are reported on by their full first name and the first letter of the surname.

=== Main perpetrator: Robert M. ===
Roberts Miķelsons ("Robert M."; born in Riga, Latvia, 14 September 1983) became a naturalised Dutch citizen in 2008. He was convicted of possession of child pornography in Germany in 2003, while working at a daycare facility in Heidelberg. In 2004, he married Richard van Olffen. From 2007 to 2009, he worked at several daycare centres of "Het Hofnarretje" group, and from 2009 to 2010, at "Jenno's Knuffelparadijs". According to evaluations of the Pieter Baan Centre, a forensic psychiatric observation clinic, Miķelsons is a hypersexual paedophile with a personality disorder.

=== Richard van O. ===
Richard van Olffen ("Richard van O."), was accused of possession of child sexual abuse material (pornography) as well as sexual assault on an 11–16-year-old boy, both of which he was acquitted. He was charged with being an accessory to the crimes of Robert Miķelsons.

=== Edwin R. ===
Edwin R., a 39-year-old employee at "Het Hofnarretje" daycare centre, was suspected of engaging in webcam sex with minors and possessing child pornography, and was released on bail on 3 March 2011. He was ultimately not prosecuted because the Public Prosecution Service expected that the length of any prison sentence imposed would be shorter than the time Edwin R. had already spent in pre-trial detention.

== Victims ==
Miķelsons confessed to abusing 83 young children, but he has only been charged with abusing 67 of them, as some parents preferred to keep their children out of court records due to privacy concerns. The youngest child was just 19 days old when the abuse took place. The abuse took place at childcare facilities where Miķelsons worked, at the homes of children he babysat for, and at the home of Miķelsons and Van Olffen. According to media reports, Miķelsons admitted abusing the children and suggested that more children might have been involved. According to the prosecution (Dutch: Openbaar Ministerie), Miķelsons carefully scouted his babysitting addresses for presence of heavy curtains and absence of nanny cams. He stopped abusing them when they were old enough to talk.

== Trial ==
The trial started on 12 March 2012 in the Court of Amsterdam (Dutch: Rechtbank Amsterdam), a Dutch court of first instance. It took place at "de Bunker", a strongly defended courtroom in Amsterdam Nieuw-West. During the preliminary motions the parents of the children were granted the right to speak during the trial (a right normally only granted to direct victims), a decision which was challenged by Miķelsons' attorneys. Upon the granting of the right to speak, his lawyers (Wim Anker and Tjalling van der Goot) requested substitution (Dutch: wraking) of the three judges, which was denied. The prosecution demanded a sentence of 20 years' imprisonment, followed by involuntary commitment (Dutch: TBS: Ter beschikkingstelling van de Staat) for Miķelsons and 12 years for Van Olffen. The TBS charge was based on a psychiatric report from the Pieter Baan Centre. The report was based solely on observation of his behaviour in prison, as Miķelsons had refused to cooperate with a psychiatric evaluation. According to the prosecution Miķelsons was "cold, calculating, refined and proud of his actions". Although Miķelsons pleaded guilty to the abuse, the defence demanded "almost full acquittal", stating that the search warrant for Mikelson and Van Olffen's house (and thus the photo and video evidence from the computers) had not been obtained correctly. On 20 April 2012, the hearings ended with the "last word" of the defendants (as is customary in Dutch criminal law). Miķelsons indicated that he was sorry about his acts and that he should have done more to prevent his acts from happening:

Ik had meer moeten doen. U hebt gelijk, ik had de perfecte mens moeten zijn, want alleen dan had ik deze tragedie kunnen voorkomen.
(English: "I should have done more. You are right, I should have been a perfect human, because only then could I have prevented this tragedy").

== Judgment in first instance ==
The judgment was given on 21 May 2012. Miķelsons was sentenced to 18 years imprisonment, followed by involuntary commitment, while Van Olffen was sentenced to 6 years imprisonment. The search of the defendants’ house (in which the photographic evidence was seized) was deemed admissible and the judges considered the psychiatric evaluation in which Miķelsons was diminished responsibility asserted (a requirement for involuntary commitment) reliable. Neither his diminished responsibility nor his cooperation during the investigation resulted in a lower sentence, due to the nature and level of organisation of his crimes. Upon hearing this part of the sentence, Miķelsons threw a glass of water at the judge.

Mikelsons and Van Olffen were further sentenced to pay fines totalling €467,000 and €365,000 respectively to the children. Further claims (for material damages to the parents) were deemed "too complicated" to be treated in a criminal court case, but could be claimed in a civil lawsuit. Non-payment would add 8 days imprisonment per child for Mikelsons and Van Olffen.

== Appeal ==
Miķelsons and Van Olffen appealed the judgment, as a result of which the prosecution appealed as well (a so-called "vervolg appel") in order to have more possibilities before the appellate court. The appeal commenced on 15 November 2012. The judges decided to allow a second psychological evaluation centre Oldenkotte in Rekken at the request of Mikelsons, who indicated his willingness to cooperate. The parents were also allowed to speak during the trial, as a new law making this right explicit had in the meantime entered into force.

On 26 April 2013 the court of appeal sentenced Miķelsons to 19 years imprisonment, followed by involuntary commitment.

== Cassation ==
Miķelsons appealed the judgment to the Supreme Court of the Netherlands (Hoge Raad) in a cassation procedure, in which he was represented by Dirk Daamen. The Hoge Raad dismissed the appeal, in conformity with the advice of its Advocate-General. Due to the length of the procedure before the Supreme Court, which lasted over 16 months, the length of the sentence was reduced by one month to 18 years and 11 months.

== Public reaction ==
The public in the Netherlands was shocked when the events surfaced. The public prosecution also stated during the case that the events shocked Dutch society and that it would therefore not be justified to request a lesser sentence than the 20 years demanded. The case has also had effects on male preschool professionals: according to an evaluation by the news agency NOS, and the Belangenvereniging van ouders in de kinderopvang en peuterspeelzalen (Boink) ('Organisation for parents in child care and day care'), tens of men have quit or have been fired as a result of changed public opinion towards men in the field, including negative reactions of parents.

== Worldwide arrests ==
According to the Amsterdam police, the investigation of leads found on Miķelsons' computer has led, worldwide, to the arrests of 43 suspected child molesters.
