= Ricardo Riquelme Vega =

Chilean criminal

Ricardo Riquelme Vega, also known as “El Rico”, is a Chilean-Dutch criminal, who has been convicted of leading an organization specializing in assassinations and money laundering. However, Vega has not been prosecuted nor convicted of specific murders.

== Criminal career ==
His first arrest for cocaine trafficking was in Germany in 1999.

He is believed to have been in close contact with Naoufal Fassih, a senior member of the gang suspected of being responsible for the murder and beheading of Nabil Amzieb. However, Fassih has never been charged of that crime.

Vega was arrested in a hotel in Santiago, Chile in October 2017.

On 31 May 2021 he was convicted of operating an assassination ring and laundering drug money. The trial was held in a fortified court known as De Bunker near Amsterdam Airport Schiphol. The court heard that he was in contact with Ridouan Taghi about organising murders. Judges were also told his phone had a video featuring both Daniel Kinahan and Raffaele Imperiale. It was alleged that Vega, Kinahan, Imperiale and Naoufal Fassih were involved in a drugs cartel – the Super Cartel – that dominated the market in Europe.

== See also ==
- Marengo process
