= Fonda Sahla =

Dutch politician (born 1979)

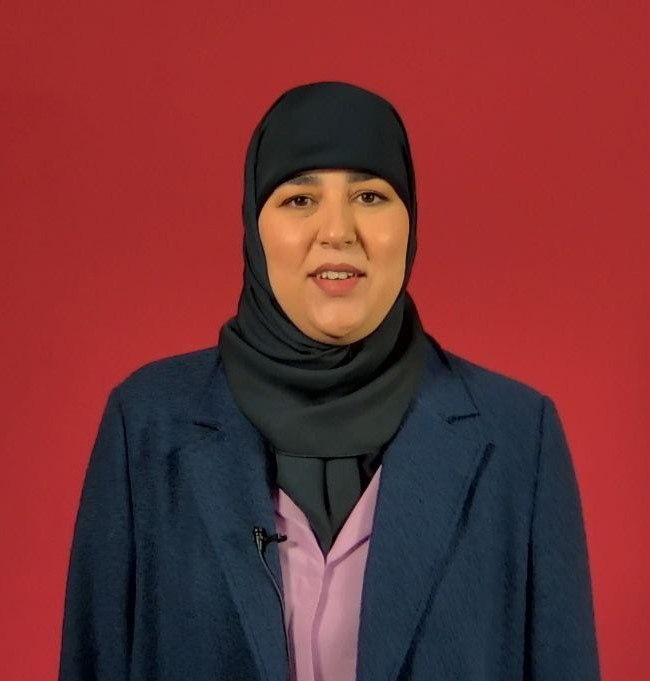

Member of the House of Representatives
- In office 27 October 2021 – 5 December 2023
- Preceded by: Rens Raemakers

Member of The Hague municipal council
- In office 29 March 2018 – 4 November 2021
- Succeeded by: Anno Fekkes

Personal details
- Born: 29 May 1979 (age 47) The Hague, Netherlands
- Party: Democrats 66
- Children: 3
- Relatives: Soumaya Sahla (sister)
- Occupation: Politician

Fonda Sahla (born 29 May 1979) is a Dutch politician of the social liberal party Democrats 66 (D66). She has served as a member of the House of Representatives from 2021 to 2023, initially as the temporary replacement of Rens Raemakers but later as the successor of Rob Jetten. Sahla's involvement in her local community led her to become politically active. She was elected to The Hague's municipal council in 2018 and participated in the March 2021 general election but was not directly elected.

== Early life and education ==
Sahla was born in 1979 in The Hague. She has seven siblings, and her parents had immigrated to the Netherlands from Morocco as guest workers. Sahla initially grew up in The Hague's Rivierenbuurt but moved to Transvaal at age seven. She went to an mbo school, which would later become ROC Mondriaan, and worked as a pharmacy assistant.

== Community work and politics ==
She became involved in her community because of her experiences in education with her oldest son. Sahla came under the impression that her son was not given the same opportunities as children on primary schools with less immigrants. She joined the parent council of primary school Het Galjoen around 2008 as well as the council of the umbrella organization consisting of about 50 schools. She sent a critical letter to Ingrid van Engelshoven, The Hague's alderwoman for education and a D66 member, in 2013, and this contact resulted in Sahla deciding to become politically active. In 2016, she was one of the founders of the weekend school Transvaal Universiteit at Het Galjoen. She also helped set up other neighborhood projects such as a group of mothers and office hours with the local police officer and with mental healthcare professionals, and she served as porch music project leader at the Residentie Orchestra starting in 2019.

Sahla first appeared on the ballot in the 2018 municipal elections as D66's fifth candidate in The Hague. She was elected to the city's municipal council and became D66's spokesperson for education, youth, and neighborhoods. She successfully called for an investigation into the availability of study spaces for students, saying that she had heard of students leaving the city in the weekends to look for a place to study. She also pled for special education classes in regular schools and for addressing loneliness among youth. In 2020, Sahla received the annual inspiration award from D66's Els Borst Netwerk. She has also served on the board of the chapter of The Hague of that organization, which promotes gender equality within the party. During the COVID-19 pandemic, she proposed to expand summer education in order to solve learning losses caused by school closures. Her plan passed the municipal council.

Sahla ran for member of parliament (MP) in the March 2021 general election, being placed 27th on D66's party list. She received 3,087 preference votes, and her party won 24 seats – not enough for Sahla to be elected. She became the temporary replacement of MP Rens Raemakers when he went on sick leave in October 2021. Sahla was sworn in on 27 October and received support from former VVD leader Frits Bolkestein, who had been a guest teacher at Transvaal Universiteit. She became the second hijab-wearing member of the House of Representatives in Dutch parliamentary history after Kauthar Bouchallikht. Sahla simultaneously vacated her seat in the municipal council. Her focus in the House was on youth care services, youth crime, youth protection, and the Participation Act, and she became a member of the Petitions Committee and the Committees for Education, Culture and Science; for Finance; for Health, Welfare and Sport; and for Justice and Security. Sahla became a permanent member of parliament on 18 January 2022 before Raemakers returned from his sick leave, when Rob Jetten left the body to become a minister in the new fourth Rutte cabinet. Her specialties changed to youth care, preschool, long-term healthcare, and caregiving, and she also became vice chair of the Committee for Social Affairs and Employment.

Sahla was supposed to be D66's sixth candidate in The Hague in the 2022 municipal elections, but decided to be one of her party's lijstduwers after her House membership had become permanent.

== Personal life ==
Sahla is married and has three children. She is a resident of The Hague's neighborhood Transvaal. Her sister, Soumaya Sahla, received media attention during Fonda's House term after Geert Wilders, an anti-Islam politician, pointed out her former membership of the terrorist Hofstad Network. The reports led her to stop her activities for the VVD.

== Electoral history ==
Electoral history of Fonda Sahla
Year	Body	Party	Pos.	Votes	Result		Ref.
Year	Body	Party	Pos.	Votes	Party seats	Individual	Ref.
2021	House of Representatives	Democrats 66	27	3,087	24 / 150	Lost (Note: Sahla was appointed to the body later during the term due to a vacancy.)	
2023	House of Representatives	Democrats 66	15	1,795	9 / 150	Lost	
2026	The Hague Municipal Council	Democrats 66	40	30	8 / 45	Lost	
