= Rachid Belkacem =

Dutch Islamist

- Born: May 6?, 1973; Bni Said, Tangier, Morocco
- Died: July 5, 2006 (aged 33); Zierikzee, Netherlands
- Status: Deceased
- Criminal charges: Terrorism
- Penalty: acquitted

Rachid Belkacem (1973 – July 5, 2006) was a Dutch national, and a suspected member of the terrorist organisation Hofstad Network. He was never convicted in court. His nickname was Abu Fadel, he was a friend of Mohammed Bouyeri, the murderer of Dutch filmmaker Theo van Gogh.

Belkacem was arrested in Whitechapel, London on 22 June 2005 on request of the Dutch authorities. Belkacems name arose in an investigation about people smuggling in the Dutch province of Zeeland. He was extradited on 2 August 2005. He was charged with being a member of a terrorist organisation. In addition he was charged with recruiting for armed struggle, several firearms offences and forging documents. Belkacem allegedly helped Redouan al-Issar, spiritual leader of the Hofstad Network, flee the Netherlands on the day of the murder of Theo van Gogh.

Belkacem was released provisionally in March 2006, because the public prosecutor deemed an eventual conviction for membership of a terrorist organisation highly unlikely. In April he was acquitted of the illegal possession of a firearm.

In July 2006, Belkacem was found dead in his house in Zierikzee. Friends and family claimed he was poisoned. Police investigated the circumstances of his death.
