= Murder of Ebrahim Buzhu =

Dutch drug trafficker (1969–2022)

Ebrahim Buzhu
- Born: 4 December 1969; Utrecht, Netherlands
- Died: 15 January 2022 (aged 52); Chiclana de la Frontera, Spain
- Occupation: Drug trafficker

On 15 January 2022, the murder of Ebrahim Buzhu took place in Chiclana de la Frontera, Spain. Buzhu, a Dutch drug trafficker of Moroccan origin, was shot through the head and his body was found by a passerby who had notified the Civil Guard. The rented vehicle of Ebrahim Buzhu, next to the body, had been lit on fire. Following an investigation, the Spanish police concluded that Buzhu had been kidnapped and severely tortured, prior to being murdered.

== Victim ==
Buzhu's father emigrated to the Netherlands from Morocco in the 1950s and worked in a Dutch mine. His mother later rejoined his father and the couple settled in Utrecht. The father then opened a butcher shop in Amsterdam and provided financial stability to the family. After his father died, Buzhu went into organized crime alongside other Moroccans who had emigrated to the Netherlands. In order to hide his illicit wealth, Buzhu pretended his money was earned through real estate investment. His real source of income was smuggling large quantities of drugs from Morocco. In the 1990s, he was convicted by Dutch police of possession of illegal firearms and participating in torture.

On 24 June 2015, a friend of Buzhu's went to the police in Driebergen claiming he found a tracking beacon underneath his vehicle. Buzhu also came forward and claimed that the case was related to the kidnapping of coffee shop owner in 2009. The police closed the case without a thorough investigation. A few days later, he returned to the police station and filed a complaint against Ridouan Taghi and his right-hand man Saïd Razzouki for death threats. Further investigations led Buzhu to identify several organized criminals in the Dutch drug trade, with his statements giving rise to the 26Koper investigation. In 2016 his friend Ranko Scekic and another friend were the victims of an attempted assassination in Utrecht by Taghi's hitmen for their allegiance with Buzhu. The assassination was eventually called off due to heavy police presence in the neighborhood. Scekic was killed in Utrecht on 22 June 2016.
