= Soumaya Sahla =

Dutch political scientist and convicted terrorist

- Born: Soumaya Sahla; 5 July 1983 (age 43); The Hague, Netherlands
- Education: Leiden University
- Occupations: Radicalization expert; political scientist
- Political party: People's Party for Freedom and Democracy (c. 2017–2023)
- Family: Fonda Sahla (sister)

Soumaya Sahla (Dutch pronunciation: [suˈmaːjaː ˈsaːlaː]; born 5 July 1983) is a Dutch political scientist and convicted terrorist.

Born in The Hague, Sahla was arrested in 2005, when she was living with Nouredine el Fahtni, a member of the Islamic terrorist cell Hofstad Network. She spent three years in prison for illegal firearms possession and membership of a terrorist organization. Her conviction was upheld in 2016 by the Supreme Court of the Netherlands.

Sahla started studying political science in prison, and she continued with a PhD at Leiden University in 2018. She became an active member of the conservative-liberal People's Party for Freedom and Democracy (VVD) in 2017 after she befriended its former leader, Frits Bolkestein. Allegations that she had used their relationship to obtain money, denied by Sahla, resulted in her expulsion from the VVD in 2023.

== Early life ==
Sahla was born in 1983 in The Hague's Stationsbuurt, and she grew up in the city's Transvaal neighborhood. She has seven siblings, and her parents had immigrated to the Netherlands from Morocco as guest workers. His father co-founded a mosque together with an Imam, and Sahla established its girl's association.

== Terrorism case ==
Intending to study abroad, Sahla moved in with a partner. However, upon learning he was disinterested in her academic ambitions, Sahla moved back with her parents. She finally ran away from her parental home in 2005, as she was pressured to reconcile the relationship. Sahla ended up at Nouredine el Fahtni, a distant relative and a member of the Islamic terrorist cell Hofstad Network.

They were arrested weeks later – in June 2005 – at Amsterdam Lelylaan station, when El Fahtni was carrying a loaded firearm. Police detectives found more weapons in September 2006 at a place where Sahla had been staying. She was prosecuted as part of the Piranha court case, and her conviction of illegal firearms possession and membership of a terrorist organization was made final by the Supreme Court of the Netherlands in 2016. She had already finished her three-year prison sentence in May 2008. The highest court determined she had been aware of El Fahtni's radical views. Sahla was acquitted of charges that she was helping to plot terrorist attacks against politicians including Geert Wilders despite her having discussed the home addresses of several politicians with her sister.

== Education and VVD membership ==
In prison, Sahla started studying political science. She graduated from Leiden University, and she finished her master's in African studies in 2018. She continued with a PhD in philosophy of law. She met Frits Bolkestein, the former leader of the VVD, at a book presentation in 2011, and they became close friends. Bolkestein's 2018 book Bij het scheiden van de markt was dedicated to her. Sahla also had contact with politicians Gert-Jan Segers (CU) and Pieter Omtzigt (CDA). She became an active member of the VVD in 2017, joining its thematic networks and hosting debates and round tables as a radicalization expert. Besides, she sat on a radicalization and extremism advisory board of the municipality of Amsterdam.

Wilders started to attack Sahla in late 2021 on social media and in a debate in the House of Representatives – shortly after the election to the House of her sister, Fonda Sahla. He said that the VVD had taken in a Muslim terrorist and that he was worried for his safety. After Wilders's debate comments, VVD parliamentary leader Sophie Hermans called Sahla's membership a complicated matter. In a statement, Sahla declared she regretted the choices she had made earlier in her life, and she announced a partial retreat from her political activities. Wilders continued to criticize Sahla, including after an October 2023 radio appearance of her.

Opinion magazine HP/De Tijd published an article on 30 October 2023 in which Sahla was accused by Martijn Bolkestein, the nephew of Frits Bolkestein, of abusing her friendship with Frits to obtain €85,000, when he had been ill and vulnerable. Sahla denied the allegations; she acknowledged that Bolkestein had paid for her PhD starting in 2018, but she said Bolkestein had been in good health at the time. She filed a criminal complaint against Martijn Bolkestein for defamation. The VVD expelled Sahla from the party the same day the article came out. She unsuccessfully appealed the board's decision, as the appeal committee argued the expulsion had resulted from a cumulation of incidents.
