= Halal-TV =

- Presented by: Cherin Awad; Dalia Azzam Kassem; Khadiga El khabiry
- Country of origin: Sweden
- Original language: Swedish
- No. of seasons: 1
- No. of episodes: 7

Production
- Running time: 30 minutes

Original release
- Network: SVT2
- Release: November 3, 2008

Halal-TV was a Swedish television show, based on the Dutch show De Meiden van Halal. The program was hosted by three Swedish Muslim women who interviewed members of the public on a wide range of subjects through an Islamic lens. The show's run consisted of seven episodes and a special debate episode. The program was broadcast on SVT2 in the fall of 2008.

The program sparked controversy before the first episode had been broadcast. Cherin Awad, one of the hosts, had made a statement in the show Existens five years earlier which some interpreted as her condoning stoning because of sexual infidelity.

Another controversy emerged when author Carl Hamilton appeared for an interview and insisted on shaking the presenter's hands. Two of the hosts refused, as it would have violated their religious beliefs. This sparked a heated discussion between Hamilton and the hosts which was later published by SVT.

== Episodes ==
| Episode | Date | Subject | Guests |
|---|---|---|---|
| 1 | 2008-11-03 | The Class Society | Carl Hamilton, Mona Sahlin |
| 2 | 2008-11-10 | Equality | Nyamko Sabuni |
| 3 | 2008-11-17 | Beauty ideals | Bingo Rimér, Louise Bratt, Isabella Löwengrip |
| 4 | 2008-11-24 | Alcohol | Leif Silbersky, Maria Larsson |
| 5 | 2008-12-01 | Sex | Charlotta Levay |
| 6 | 2008-12-08 | The Cost of Immigration | Jimmie Åkesson, Tobias Billström |
| 7 | 2008-12-15 | Sports as a Religion | Kutte Jönsson, Petter Karlsson |
