= Life imprisonment in the Netherlands =

Since the abolition of the death penalty in the Netherlands in 1870, life imprisonment specifically means imprisonment lasting for the rest of the convicted person's life without the possibility of parole. Unlike in other countries in Europe, there is generally no possibility of early release for anyone sentenced to life imprisonment. Though the prisoner can appeal for a pardon from the monarch, it must be granted by royal decree. This is the only way a person sentenced to life imprisonment can ever be set free from a life sentence; however, there have been few pardons in recent years. Since the 1970s, only three such pardons have been successful, two of which had been terminally ill. As of 2023, there are around 30 inmates serving life sentences in Dutch prisons.

While there is still no possibility of parole for any person sentenced to life imprisonment, The Supreme Court of the Netherlands ruled in 2016 that the then-current manner of imposing life sentences without any possibility of release other than a rarely-granted pardon violated Article 3 (which concerns the prohibition of torture and inhumane punishment) of the European Convention on Human Rights. The court ruled that prisoners sentenced to life imprisonment must be eligible to have their cases reviewed no later than 25 years after beginning their sentence. The court also stated that even if a return to society is not feasible at the 25-year mark, the prisoner should be entitled to periodic review of his sentence afterward. Even though courts have the authority to determine whether a life-sentenced prisoner's return to society is advisable, only a pardon can free a prisoner sentenced to life imprisonment.

Due to the strict nature of the sentence, most "common" murders result in a sentence of around 12 to 30 years. The judicial panel (always composed of three members) is not able to award sentences of longer than 15 years' imprisonment for manslaughter alone (so not combined with other facts constituting an offense), so if malice aforethought has not been proven, a criminal will never receive a sentence of longer than 15 years. The only life sentence for a single murder without aggravating circumstances was given in 2005 to Mohammed Bouyeri for the murder of Dutch film director Theo van Gogh, due to its strong political nature. In all other cases, there have been circumstances of recurrence (murder committed after sentencing for another murder), multitude (several murders), or severe gravity to the crime (i.e. torture murder).
