= Ridouan Taghi =

Moroccan-Dutch suspect (born 1977)

- رضوان التاغي
- Dubai Police mugshot of Taghi after his 2019 arrest
- Born: December 20, 1977 (age 48); Bni Selmane, Morocco
- Occupation: One of the leaders of the Mocro Maffia
- Criminal charges: Murder, drug trafficking
- Accomplice: Saïd Razzouki

Details
- Imprisoned at: Nieuw Vosseveld

Ridouan Taghi (born 20 December 1977) is a Moroccan and Dutch criminal who became a prime suspect in at least ten murders related to organised crime, drug trafficking and leading a criminal organisation. On 27 February 2024, he was convicted and sentenced to life imprisonment.

Until his late 2019 arrest in Dubai, Taghi was the most wanted criminal in the Netherlands with a record-breaking reward of €100,000. In 2022, he was held at Nieuw Vosseveld, a maximum security prison in Vught and the main suspect in the Marengo trial.

== Youth ==
Taghi was born in 1977 in Bni Selmane, a small town in northern Morocco. In 1980, he moved to Vianen in the Netherlands with his parents, his older brother and two sisters. While in the Netherlands, another six sisters and one brother were born.

In the early 1990s, he joined the youth gang Bad Boys. The Bad Boys were active in the Amsterdamsestraatweg in Utrecht and the mall Cityplaza in Nieuwegein. In 1992, Taghi was first sentenced for, among other things, burglaries and possession of weapons. At age 17, Taghi quit his VWO-education in Nieuwegein.

For a while he ran a grillroom in the Amsterdamsestraatweg in Utrecht. In 2009, he deregistered from the Dutch population administration.

== Assassinations ==
Despite earlier convictions, Taghi remained out of the police's sight. The first time he came to notice again was in 2013, when the Spanish police linked him to the assassination of Mohammed Abdellaoui the same year. At that time, he was also seen as a major cocaine dealer. Starting in 2013, the Team Criminal Intelligence and Financial Intelligence Unit from the Dutch police received tips about Taghi.

The tipping point was when in June 2015 drug trafficker Ebrahim Buzhu reported Taghi and his suspected right hand man Saïd Razzouki to the Dutch police. Buzhu claimed he was on Taghi's hitlist after he helped abduct a coffee shop owner in 2009, with whom Taghi was friends. Buzhu was found dead near Cádiz in January 2022.

On 20 January 2014, there was an unsuccessful attempt to kill criminal Samir Jabli in Amersfoort. Instead, a student was killed. On 1 December 2014 Jabli was killed in another attempt on his life. Witness Nabil B. has alleged that Taghi was involved in this murder, but the Prosecution left it out of the trial due to lack of evidence. In August 2021, de Telegraaf reported that the police found Taghi's DNA on bullets used in Jabli's assassination.

According to the Prosecution, Taghi ordered the assassination of spy shop employee Ronald Bakker in September 2015 in Huizen. Bakker was ordered by the police to hand over information about his clients, which included Taghi's organisation. The Prosecution assumed this is why Taghi ordered the assassination. There were also plans to shoot the spy shop with a bazooka, but the suspects were arrested beforehand.

Abderrahim Belhadj was killed on 9 May 2016. According to the Prosecution, Taghi ordered this because Belhadj had stolen two blocks of cocaine.

On 22 June 2016, criminal Samir Erraghib was assassinated in IJsselstein. According to the Prosecution, Taghi ordered this assassination because Erraghib had talked about him to the police.

According to the Prosecution, Taghi and Razzouki went looking for Buzhu after he had delivered incriminating statements to the police. When they could not find Buzhu, they targeted a friend of Buzhu, Ranko Scekic. Scekic was killed on 22 June 2016, a few days before he was scheduled to be heard as a witness in a criminal case against Taghi's organisation.

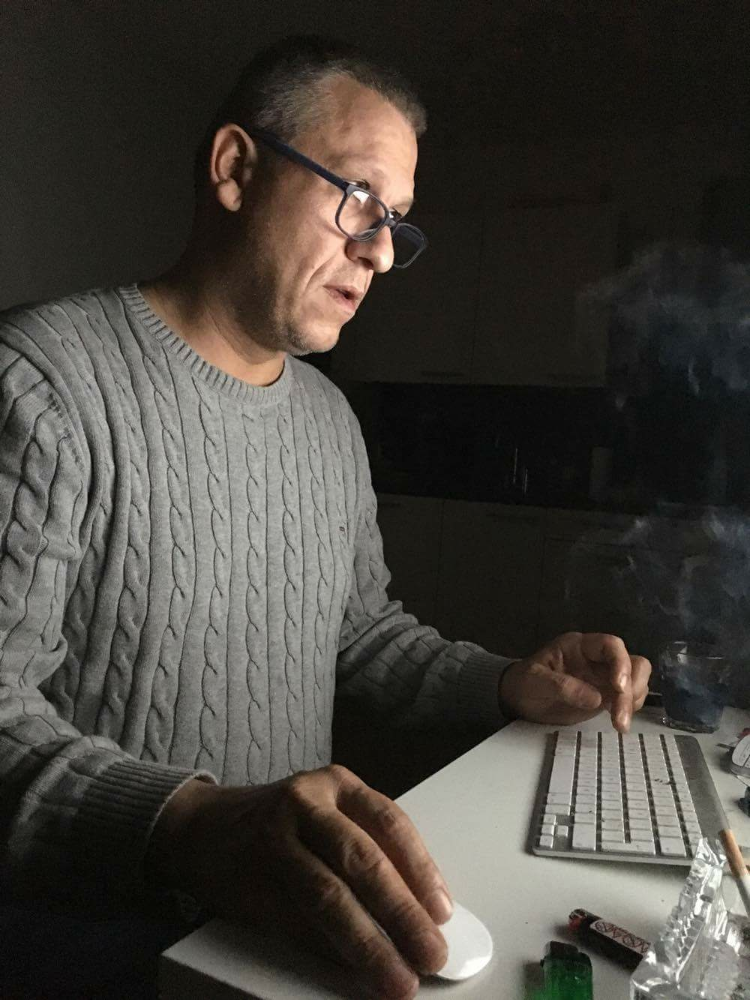
Crimeblogger Martin Kok who was killed in 2016.

In June 2016, former criminal turned crime blogger Martin Kok published on his website Vlinderscrime about two henchmen of Taghi. According to the Prosecution, this made him a target of Taghi. The first attempt was in July 2016, when they had placed a bomb under his car. This failed, because Kok found the bomb before detonation. Kok continued publishing, including a piece on 12 September the same year about Taghi, Richard R. and Naoufal F.. This led to another attempt in Amsterdam-Zuid on 8 December 2016. This attempt failed again, because the weapon faltered without Kok noticing the shooter. The same night Kok was assassinated in Laren.

On the night of 5 December 2016, criminal Khalid B. was the target of two or three armed men who entered his house in Rotterdam. Khalid B. managed to escape. The Dutch Prosecuction argues that Taghi is behind this, because Khalid B. and his brother wanted revenge for the murder of Samir Erraghib.

On 12 January 2017, an attempted assassination of Khalid H. took place, which was ordered by Taghi according to the Prosecution. This attempt failed and instead got flatmate Hakim Changachi killed. Two days later, there was another attempt, but Khalid H. managed to escape. One person involved in the attempt that got Changachi killed, was Nabil B., a friend of Changachi's family. This got Nabil B. into trouble with the family and the Taghi group. This led to Nabil B. turning himself over to the police and eventually becoming a crown witness in the Marengo trial against Taghi and his group.

According to the Prosecution, Taghi had ordered three assassinations in 2017 through the motorclub Caloh Wagoh; Justin Jap Tjong on 31 January 2017, Farid Souhali on 17 April 2017 and Jaïr Wessels on 7 July 2017.

Since the beginning of 2016, Taghi was in a conflict with criminal Mustapha F.. In November 2017, there was an attempt to assassinate F. in Marrakesh. However, this attempt failed and instead a son of a Moroccan judge was killed. Two shooters and a brother of Taghi have been sentenced for this murder. Additionally, in October 2021 a nephew of Taghi was arrested for his involvement.

=== Assassinations related to crown witness ===
On 23 March 2018, the Dutch Prosecution announced that Nabil B. had testified against Taghi and his group. Five days later, two attempts to assassinate B.'s brother Reduan failed. However, a day later, on 29 March 2018, Reduan B. was killed. Taghi has not been charged for this murder, but Reduan B.'s death has been linked to the announcement of Nabil B.'s testimony.

==== Derk Wiersum ====
In September 2019, the lawyer of Nabil B., Derk Wiersum, was killed at his home. This was seen as a further escalation and an "attack on the rule of law". Taghi has not been charged with this murder, but media and Prosecution assume Taghi is behind the assassination. The two main perpetrators of the murder are also suspected of two murders in Suriname in 2019. The two victims were part of Mustapha F.'s group and the Dutch Prosecution thus believes these murders were also ordered by Taghi's group. Furthermore, two nephews of Taghi are suspected of involvement in Wiersums assassination.

==== Peter R. de Vries ====
In July 2021, Peter R. de Vries was killed in Amsterdam. He was a crime reporter, and was a confidant of Nabil B. in the Marengo trial. Back in 2019, the Dutch Prosecution had informed De Vries that he was on Taghi's hit list. Taghi denied this in 2019 and Taghi, who was at that time in prison, has denied any involvement in the murder. Arrested suspects have however been linked to the group around Taghi. And a witness has testified that Taghi had given the assignment to kill De Vries back in April 2019.

== Network ==
Documents produced by the Drug Enforcement Administration (DEA) of the United States, and sent to the Dutch police, exposed what appeared to be a large drug network headed by Ridouan Taghi, Raffaele Imperiale (Camorra's drugs and arms dealer), Daniel Kinahan (Irish reputed gang boss) and Edin Gačanin (Bosnian drug trafficker). The DEA regards this as one of the largest drug cartels in the world, with virtually a monopoly over Peruvian cocaine, controlling around a third of the total European cocaine trade. According to the DEA documents, the drugs are all shipped to ports in the Netherlands.

== Arrest ==
Taghi managed to evade capture by constantly altering his appearance and using false passports and visas. He was arrested in Dubai on 16 December 2019. As the Netherlands does not have an extradition treaty with the United Arab Emirates, Taghi was deported three days after his arrest; based on him being declared a persona non grata by the government, as he had entered the UAE under a false identity.

== Criminal cases ==
=== Marengo trial ===
In July 2019, the Marengo trial against seventeen suspects, with Taghi as main suspects, started. Taghi's lawyer in this case was Inez Weski, until her arrest on 21 April 2023. The Marengo trial is held in the high-security courtroom, De Bunker.

The Dutch Prosecution has asked for a life sentence for Taghi in the trial.

== Detention ==
He is being held at Nieuw Vosseveld in Vught.

Despite strict measures, Taghi managed to stay in contact with the outside world. On 15 December 2020, the Federal Bureau of Investigation notified the Dutch police that Taghi had been able to communicate physically and electronically with the outside world through one or more bribed prison guards. In December 2020, Taghi's nephew and lawyer Youssef Taghi applied for access to Taghi in his prison. This was first rejected, because there was an investigation into abuse of attorney–client privilege between Youssef and another nephew of Taghi. When in March 2021 the investigation concluded that no abuse was found, Youssef was allowed in. In February 2021, the Dutch police started an investigation into ways in which Taghi was able to communicate with the outside world. On 23 July 2021, after the murder of De Vries, the police received permission from the judge to place listening devices when Youssef and Ridouan Taghi met in the prison, followed by cameras in September. This investigation showed that Youssef communicated messages between Ridouan Taghi and his family. Among other things, they discussed breakout attempts and the molesting of an ex-brother-in-law of Ridouan Taghi. On 8 October 2021, Youssef was arrested while visiting Taghi in prison. Youssef Taghi was convicted for membership of a criminal organisation, planning a breakout attempt and involvement in drug trafficking and money laundering.

Prosecution continued investigating other ways Taghi could have communicated outside the prison, because the FBI reported that Taghi was able to communicate before Youssef Taghi had gained access. In the summer of 2022, the police decrypted additional messages from SkyECC. Messages between family members suggested that Taghi's lawyer Inez Weski was used for communication. On 21 April 2023, Weski was arrested on suspicion of membership of a criminal organisation and violating confidentiality.

At the EBI, Taghi met Mohammed Bouyeri, with whom he developed a close bond. Concerns about this relationship was cause for Bouyeri's transfer to another prison. Taghi and Bouyeri continued writing each other letters, mostly consisting of Quran verses. Gökmen Tanis, perpetrator of the Utrecht tram shooting, also sent at least one letter to Taghi. Some of the letters have been rejected by the prison, because they feared that the Quran verses used by them contained hidden messages.
