= Pieter Baan Centre =

Forensic psychiatric observation clinic in Almere, Netherlands

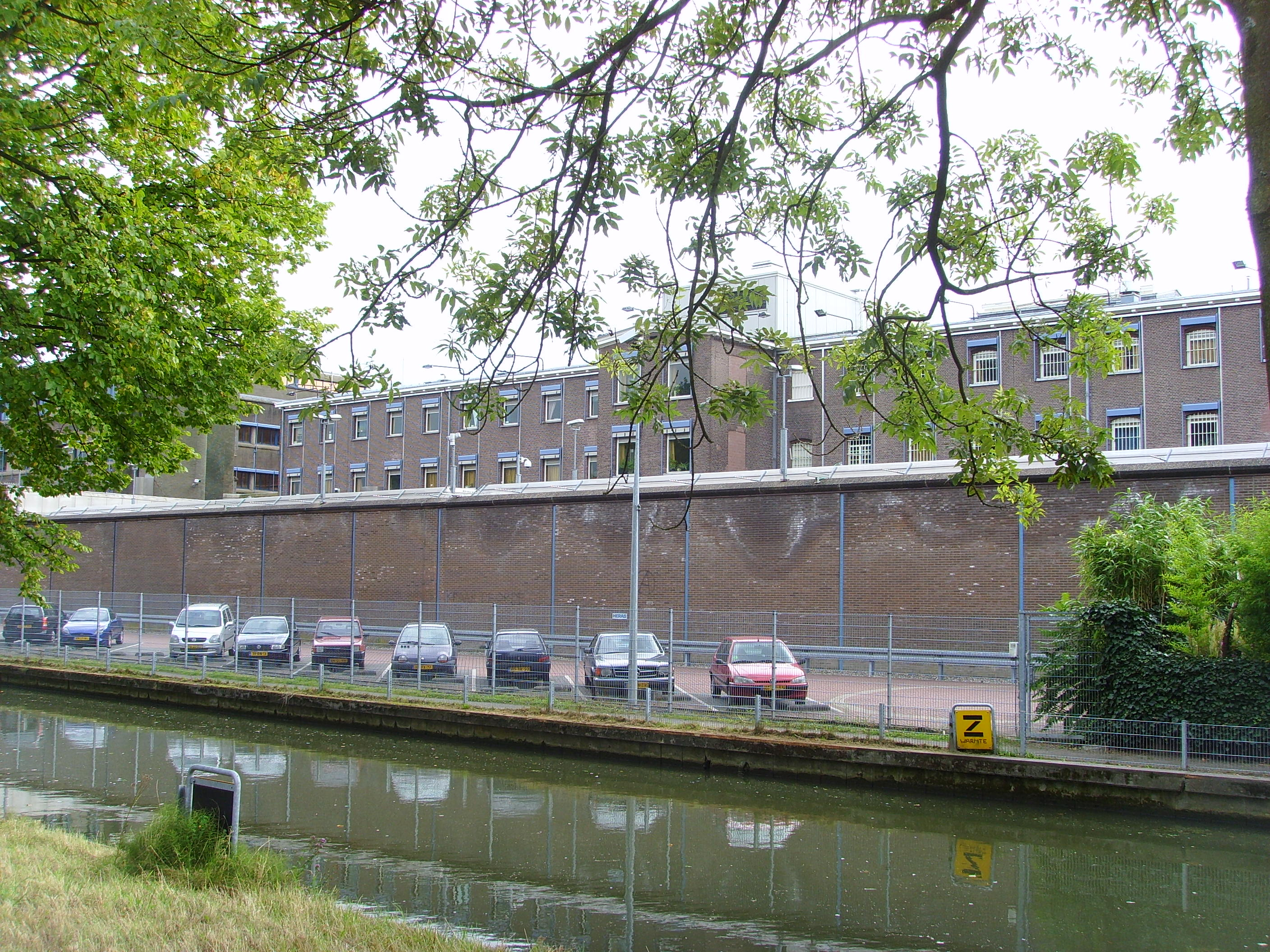
The former Pieter Baan Centre in Utrecht

The Pieter Baan Centre (Pieter Baan Centrum) is a forensic psychiatric observation clinic in Almere, Netherlands, operated by the Ministry of Security and Justice, where suspects of crimes in the Netherlands are observed to ascertain whether they can be held wholly responsible for their suspected crimes. When suspects are found guilty, but performed their crimes while suffering from some sort of psychiatric or psychological disorder, they may be applicable for involuntary commitment (in Dutch terbeschikkingstelling or TBS), which means To be held at disposal. This is a special measure for crimes which are committed under psychologically abnormal circumstances. The purpose is to treat the perpetrator rather than to punish them and to work towards their reintegration into society. The TBS measure is usually enacted after about one third to half of the prison sentence has been served, though this practice is now (as of medio 2010) under review. The duration of TBS terms are decided upon by the treatment staff in concordance with the Ministry of Justice and can last decades. For this reason perpetrators not always cooperate with the observations of the Pieter Baan Centre.

The clinic has been part of the Netherlands Institute for Forensic Psychiatry and Psychology (NIFP) since 2007.
