= Redouan al-Issar =

Redouan al Issar (also known as Abu Khaled or simply "The Syrian") was born in Syria in the late fifties or early sixties. He is by profession a geologist.

He was the oldest member of the Dutch-based terrorist group, Hofstadgroep or Hofstad Network. He is considered to be the spiritual leader of the group.
