= Nouredine el Fahtni =

Moroccan terrorist (born 1982)

- Born: August 15, 1982 (age 44); Midar, Morocco
- Status: In prison
- Criminal charges: Terrorism, Weapon Charges
- Penalty: 5 years and 4 years imprisonment (different cases)

Nouredine el Fahtni (also Noreddine el Fahtni; born 15 August 1982), is a Moroccan who is a suspected member of the Islamic terrorist organisation Hofstad Network, a Dutch organisation agitating for jihad against parliamentary democracy and the foundation of an Islamic state.

El Fahtni was arrested in Portugal in the summer of 2004, during the European Football Championship, on suspicion of planning an attack on then Portuguese prime minister José Manuel Durão Barroso, but was released for insufficient evidence.

In 2005, El Fahtni and his wife Soumaya Sahla were arrested in the Netherlands for possessing a loaded machine gun, for which Sahla received a nine-month sentence and El Fahtni five years. Prosecutors sought a 12-year sentence for El Fahtni's suspected involvement in the "Piranha terrorism plot" against politicians and the Dutch Secret Service, AIVD. On 1 December 2006, he was sentenced to four years imprisonment, while co-conspirators Mohammed Chentouf also received four years and Samir Azzouz eight years.
