= Bni Selmane =

Bni Selmane بني سلمان
- Rural commune and town
- Interactive map of Bni Selmane
- Coordinates: 35.1136°N 4.9688°W
- Country: Morocco
- Region: Tanger-Tetouan-Al Hoceima
- Province: Chefchaouen

Population (2004)
  - Total: 23,396
- Time zone: UTC+0 (GMT)

Bni Selmane is a small town and rural commune in Chefchaouen Province, Tanger-Tetouan-Al Hoceima, Morocco. At the time of the 2004 census, the commune had a total population of 23,396 people living in 3,090 households.
