= Hofstad Network =

Defunct Islamic terrorist group in the Netherlands

- Hofstadnetwerk; Hofstadgroep
- Leaders: Mohammed Bouyeri; Samir Azzouz; Redouan al-Issar
- Founded: Late 2003
- Dates active: 2003–2004
- Country: Netherlands
- Headquarters: None
- Active regions: Randstad
- Ideology: Jihadism; Takfir wal-Hijra; Islamism
- Size: 19

The Hofstad Network (Dutch: Hofstadnetwerk or Hofstadgroep) was an Islamic terror group composed mostly of Dutch citizens, and mainly young men between the ages of 18 and 32. The name "Hofstad" was originally the codename the Dutch secret service AIVD used for the network and leaked to the media. The name likely refers to the nickname of the city of The Hague, where some of the suspected terrorists lived. The network was active throughout the 2000s.

The group was made up of Muslim immigrants living in the Netherlands, second and third generation immigrants to the Netherlands, and Dutch converts. The majority of these immigrants came from Morocco.

The network was said to have links to networks in Spain and Belgium. Among their contacts was Abdeladim Akoudad, also known as Naoufel, one of the suspects of the 2003 Casablanca bombings. The group was influenced by the ideology of Takfir wal-Hijra, a militant offshoot of the Egyptian Muslim Brotherhood. Redouan al-Issar, also known as "The Syrian", was the suspected spiritual leader of the group. Most media attention was attracted by Mohammed Bouyeri, sentenced to life imprisonment for murdering film director Theo van Gogh in 2004 and by Samir Azzouz, suspected of planning terrorist attacks on the Dutch parliament and several strategic targets such as the national airport and a nuclear reactor. The group was also suspected of planning to kill several members of government and parliament.

== History ==
In 2002, the Hofstad group was discovered by the Dutch General Intelligence and Security Service (AIVD). The intelligence gathered in the first years after the group was discovered was limited, revealing that the group had only been meeting together. These were informal living-room meetings held by a Syrian asylum-seeker. By the end of 2002, the AIVD began to suspect that the organization was developing extremist views and discussing mass casualty events.

On 14 October 2003, Samir Azzouz, Ismail Akhnikh, Jason Walters and Redouan al-Issar were put under arrest for planning a (according to the AIVD) "terrorist attack in the Netherlands", but were released soon after. Azzouz was eventually tried in this case, but acquitted for lack of evidence in 2005: he did possess what he thought to be a home-made bomb, but having used the wrong type of fertilizer, the device would never have exploded.

At the beginning of 2003, a Hofstad member and his friend tried to join an Islamic rebel group in Chechnya, but were discovered by authorities and arrested. During the summer, two Hofstad group members traveled to Pakistan where they received paramilitary training. In September, the two men returned and it was discovered by authorities that these same men could be traced to having talked to a man having ties to the Casablanca bombings earlier that year. On 14 October of that year, the Spanish authorities arrested a Moroccan man who was suspected to be involved in suspicious activity. Police in the Netherlands arrested five Hofstad associates, including three who had traveled abroad and were in contact with extremists in Morocco and Syria.

In 2003, Mohammed Bouyeri, the man who murdered Dutch filmmaker Theo van Gogh, was radicalized. He withdrew from mainstream Dutch society by quitting his job and distancing himself from all friends and family who were non-religious. During this time, he became known as the "Taliban" by many in his neighborhood.

In 2004, the group was under heavy surveillance by the AIVD, which dampened the group's activities.

On 18 May 2004, authorities received a tip that a grocery store worker had been involved in preparing for a terror attack. A couple weeks later, the Dutch secret service had arrested this man after capturing him on security cameras taking measurements of the Dutch secret service headquarters. Upon his arrest, police found maps as well as weapons that could be used to carry out the terror attacks.

On 29 August 2004, Van Gogh and Ayaan Hirsi Ali created a short film, Submission, that contained scenes of Quranic verses being painted onto semi-naked women. This was the catalyst for the group's radicalization and Bouyeri's justification to kill Van Gogh for the blasphemy of Islam.

== Claimed attacks ==
=== Theo van Gogh murder ===
Theo van Gogh's murder was the first terrorist attack claimed by the Hofstad group. In September 2004, authorities received a tip from an email that warned of two Hofstad group members preparing a terror attack. The anonymous source also admitted to being recruited by these men to carry out the planned terrorist attacks with particular targets. On 2 November of that year, Mohammed Bouyeri killed Van Gogh when he was on his way to work in Amsterdam. The killer cycled alongside the filmmaker before shooting him several times and attempting to decapitate him. Before fleeing the scene, he left a note pinned to Van Gogh's chest that had a death threat for Hirsi Ali. After the attack, Bouyeri went to a park nearby, where he had a shootout with police before being taken into custody. Witnesses said that Bouyeri had been stalking his route for some time before the attack had happened.

After the attack, the police spent the following 10 days arresting the group members. One group member who acted as the religious teacher for the group fled the country the day of Van Gogh's murder and entered Syria illegally. Shortly after the murder of Van Gogh, the organization gained the attention of national media when an attempt to arrest suspected members Jason Walters and Ismail Akhnikh led to a 14-hour siege at a house in The Hague. During these events, the name Hofstad Network became public and the media has continued to use this moniker when referring to the organization. In the months after the siege, a number of other suspected members of the organization were arrested. On 5 December 2005, the Hofstad court case against 14 suspected members began.

=== 2005 Foiled plot ===
Samir Azzouz, Jermaine Walters —suspected but not incarcerated— and another five members were arrested on suspicion of preparing an attack against (yet unnamed) national politicians and the building of the General Intelligence and Security Agency AIVD on 14 October 2005.

=== Piranha case ===
In a case known as Piranha case, six individuals were brought to court, one of them was Noureddine El Fahtni. On 1 December 2006, the District Court of Rotterdam sentenced Azzouz to 8 years in prison for preparing a terrorist attack. Noureddine El Fahtni and Mohammed Chentouf to 4 years each, Soumaya Sahla to 3 years and Brahim Harhour to 3 months. One suspect was acquitted. The Court ruled that the six individuals had not formed a terrorist organization. In appeal, the Court in The Hague convicted all defendants to more severe sentences. On 2 October 2008, Samir Azzouz was sentenced to 9 years in prison, Nouriddin El Fahtni was sentenced to 8 years, Mohammed Chentouf was sentenced to 6;6 years in prison, Soumaya Sahla was sentenced to 4 years in prison.

== Trial (Hofstad group) ==
=== District Court + appeal ===
In 2005, fourteen alleged members of the Hofstad Network were brought to trial before the District Court in Rotterdam. During the trial, the presiding judge admitted that he felt as if it was obvious that arrest leading to the hearing had created a spectacle and that the group members ideologies were being greatly scrutinized. The lawyers who defended that group labeled the trial as a "witch trial". It was clear that the ideological threat the Hofstad group had posed stirred the emotions of the public. The Court ruled that in the case of the Hofstad group there was a clear distinction between peaceful and harmful extremism. The Court acquitted four of the defendants because they showed no attempt for violence but only held extremist ideas. The Court also ruled that the group was not a terror organization.

1.	Nadir Adarraf	– acquitted
2.	Rachid Belkacem	– acquitted
3.	Mohamed El Bousklaoui	– acquitted
4.	Zakaria Taybi	– acquitted
5.	Yousef Ettoumi	– 1 year
6.	Zine Labidine Aourghe	– 18 months
7.	Mohammed Fahmi Boughabe	– 18 months
8.	Mohamed el Morabit	– 2 years
9.	Ahmed Hamdi	– 2 years
10.	Mohammed Bouyeri	– (none)
11.	Nouredine el Fahtni	– 5 years
12.	Ismail Akhnikh	– 13 years
13.	Jason Walters	– 15 years
14.	Jermaine Walters	– acquitted

Nadir Adarraf, Rachid Belkacem, Mohamed El Bousklaoui, Zakaria Taybi and Jermaine Walters were acquitted and set free. On 7 November 2006 the District Court in Rotterdam awarded them compensation (in total € 300.182,04).

Seven cases have been appealed to the Court of Appeal in The Hague. On 23 January 2008, the Court of Appeal acquitted those convicted in the first instance of participation in a criminal organization. According to the Court of Appeal, the Hofstad Group had insufficient organizational substance to conclude that there was an organization as referred to in Articles 140 and 140a of the Criminal Code. The court ruled that the cooperation of the suspects was not sufficiently structured to justify their conviction. In the opinion of the court, there was also no question of incitement to hatred. The Court ruled that the legislator only intended to criminalize incitement to hatred against vulnerable minority groups.

The Court has sentenced one of the defendants, Jason Walters, to a prison term of 15 years for the attempted murder of members of an arrest team of the police in The Hague and possession of hand grenades. A second suspect, Ismail Akhnikh, was sentenced to 15 months in prison for complicity in possession of hand grenades.

=== Supreme Court + back ===
The Public Prosecution Service lodged an appeal in cassation against the judgments of the Court. Jason Walters also lodged an appeal in cassation against his conviction (08/00695).

On 2 February 2010, the Supreme Court quashed the contested judgments and referred the cases to the Amsterdam Court of Appeal.

On 17 December 2010, the Amsterdam Court of Appeal sentenced Mohamed El Morabit, Yousef Ettoumi, Ahmed Hamdi, Mohamed Fahmi Boughabe and Nouredine el Fahtni to prison terms of 15 months, for participating in a terrorist criminal organization.

Ismail Akhnikh and Jason Walters were guilty also of possessing four hand grenades. Ismail Akhnikh was sentenced to 38 months. Jason Walters, who had thrown a shrapnel grenade in the direction of the arrest team in accordance with a predetermined plan, was sentenced to 13 years in prison on five counts of attempted murder. Upon the ruling, the court determined that the Hofstad group was a terror criminal organization who had the intent of committing crimes out of violence and hatred.

== Court rulings ==
Suspect	Parketnr.	RBROT 10-03-2006	GHSGR 23-01-2008	HR 02-02-2010	GHAMS 17-12-2010	HR 03-07-2012
Nadir Adarraf	10/000328-04	AV5108				
Rachid Belkacem	10/000396-04	AV5108				
Mohamed El Bousklaoui	10/000393-04	AV5108				
Zakaria Taybi	10/000325-04	AV5108				
Yousef Ettoumi	10/000323-04	AV5108	BC4182	BK5175	BO9017	BW5161
Zine Labidine Aourghe	10/000395-04	AV5108				
Mohammed Fahmi Boughabe	10/000365-04	AV5108	BC4178	BK5172	BO9014	BW5132
Mohamed El Morabit	10/000397-04	AV5108	BC4177	BK5182	BO9016	BW5121
Ahmed Hamdi	10/000394-04	AV5108	BC4183	BK5174	BO9018	
Mohammed Bouyeri	10/600069-05	AV5108				
Nouriddin El Fahtni	10/000354-04	AV5108	BC4171	BK5196	BO9015	BW5185
Ismail Akhnikh	10/000324-04	AV5108	BC4129	BK5189	BO8032	BW5178
Jason Walters	10/000174-04	AV5108	BC2576	BK5193	BO7690	BW5136
Jermaine W.	10/000322-04	AV5108				

After their acquittal on 10 March 2006, the five former suspects requested compensation as referred to in Article 89 of the Code of Criminal Procedure. On 7 November 2006, the District Court of Rotterdam (Raadkamer) decided on their requests.

Applicant	Parketnr.	Decision art. 89 Sv		Decision art. 591a Sv	
Nadir Adarraf	10/000328-04	ECLI:NL:RBROT:2006:AZ4924	€ 72.148,74	ECLI:NL:RBROT:2006:AZ4911	€ 540,00
Rachid Belkacem	10/000396-04	ECLI:NL:RBROT:2006:AZ4952	€ 74.368,00	ECLI:NL:RBROT:2006:AZ4950	€ 540,00
Mohamed El Bousklaoui	10/000393-04	ECLI:NL:RBROT:2006:AZ4908	€ 88.550,00	ECLI:NL:RBROT:2006:AZ4904	€ 540,00
Zakaria Taybi	10/000325-04	ECLI:NL:RBROT:2006:AZ4955	€ 24.137,50	ECLI:NL:RBROT:2006:AZ4954	€ 540,00
Jermaine Walters	10/000322-04	ECLI:NL:RBROT:2006:AZ4896	€ 40.977,80	ECLI:NL:RBROT:2006:AZ4892	€ 540,00
			€ 300.182,04		€ 2.700,00

== VARA ==
On 18 May 2006, a group of four young men delivered flowers to the Dutch public broadcaster VARA. The flowers included a note, "greetings, the Hofstadgroup," which was a 'thank you' for the VARA Zembla documentary broadcast the week prior, on the topic of Ayaan Hirsi Ali's asylum background. Jermaine Walters was said to be one of the men.

== See also ==
- Piranha court case Trial of an Islamist terror group — 'Piranha group' — which was a direct successor to the 2002-2004 Hofstadgroup
- Moroccan Islamic Combatant Group
- List of designated terrorist groups
