= De Meiden van Halal =

Dutch television programme

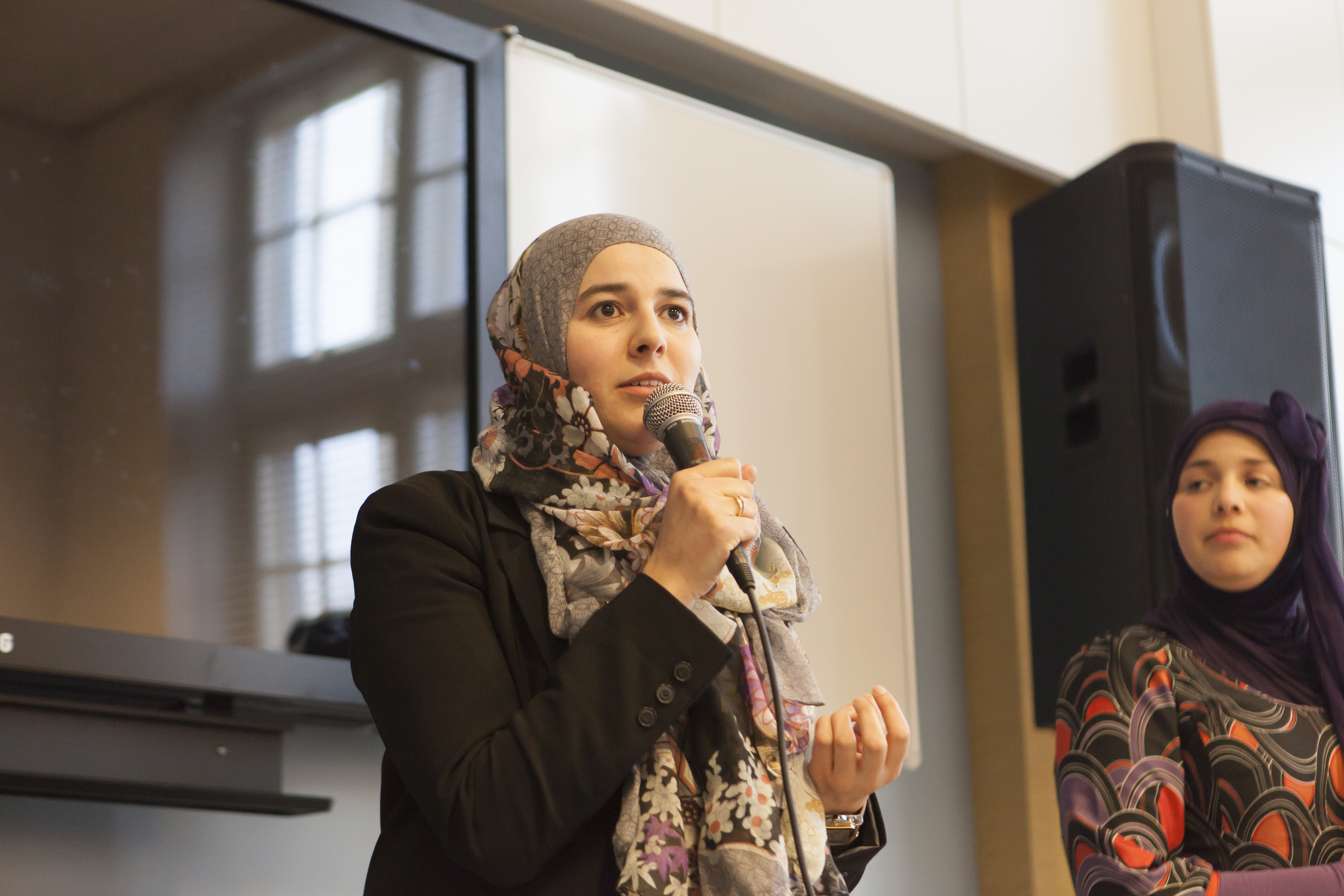
Jihad & Esmaa Alariachi (2017)

De Meiden van Halal (English: "The Girls of Halal") is a Dutch television programme of the Dutch broadcasting foundation NPS. The show is about Islamic Dutch people interacting with people from other religions and cultures. The presenters are Moroccan-Dutch sisters Esmaa (born 1979), Jihad (born 1983) and Hajar (born 1986) Alariachi.

In 2009, Jihad and Hajar were on board Turkish Airlines Flight 1951 when it crashed outside of Schiphol Airport. Jihad was taken to hospital with minor injuries. Also Hajar was treated for her injuries in hospital Spaarne in Haarlem.

== See also ==
- Halal-TV
- Islam in the Netherlands
