= Guus Kouwenhoven =

Dutch arms dealer (1942–2026)

Augustinus Petrus Kouwenhoven
- Born: 15 February 1942; Netherlands
- Died: 6 September 2026 (aged 84)
- Occupation: Arms dealer

Guus Kouwenhoven, often misspelled as Gus Kouwenhoven or Guus van Kouwenhoven (15 February 1942 – 6 September 2026) was a Dutch arms dealer convicted of accessory to war crimes and arms trafficking in Liberia during the presidency of Charles Taylor.

== Deportation from the U.S. ==
In the 1970s, Kouwenhoven was sentenced to two years in prison in the United States after being caught in a Federal Bureau of Investigation sting operation along with his then business partner Peter Rombouts while attempting to sell 6 stolen artworks, including a Rembrandt. In this case he was sentenced to two years incarceration but served only 17 days before being deported from the United States.

== Involvement in Liberia ==
Kouwenhoven started his career in Liberia in the 1980s as the manager of Hotel Africa and later on headed the Oriental Timber Corporation (OTC), the main timber company in Liberia in the early 2000s, during the Second Liberian Civil War. The company was used as a cover for arms smuggling from China and Serbia, via Viktor Bout an arms trader from the former Soviet Union who frequented the hotel and used it as a hub for arms sales all over Africa. Syrian-born Richard (Amar) Chichakli was the financial manager of Bout's arms operations.

The United Nations issued an order in 2001 banning him from traveling because of arms trafficking, and banned arms trade with him.

The three, Taylor himself, Kouwenhoven and Bout were arrested within a single year, while Chichakli evaded arrest for several years, and was caught in Australia in 2013.

== Trials ==
Kouwenhoven was arrested in the Netherlands on 18 March 2005 and stood trial at the Court of First Instance in The Hague, starting 24 April 2006, charged with arms smuggling and war crimes in Liberia in the 1990s, for which the Dutch public prosecutors sought a 20-year jail sentence and a fine of €450,000. The court tried to summon Charles Taylor to testify against Kouwenhoven. On 7 June 2006 Kouwenhoven was sentenced to 8 years in jail for arms smuggling. The court did not find him guilty of war crimes. Both the public prosecutors and Kouwenhoven sought a higher court appeal and Kouwenhoven was released in March 2007 in anticipation of his new trial. The Court of Appeal in The Hague acquitted him of all charges on 10 March 2008 and sharply criticized the work of the prosecution.

The prosecution appealed the acquittal to the Supreme Court on 20 March 2008. In April 2010 the Supreme Court ordered a re-trial at the court in Den Bosch. In November 2014, the court in Den Bosch was to hear arguments for dismissal as there were no witnesses available to testify. The Prosecutor Cara Pronk-Jordan wished to have the earlier anonymous interviews used as evidence. Kouwenhoven fled to South Africa in December 2016, claiming medical grounds. On 21 April 2017, Kouwenhoven was convicted in absentia to serve a 19-year jail sentence for illegal arms trafficking and complicity in war crimes in Liberia and Guinea. A day after this conviction, “Interpol despatched a Red List Notice to the Interpol NCB in Pretoria” requesting that he be provisionally arrested.

He was arrested on a Dutch warrant on 8 December 2017 at his home in Fresnaye, Cape Town, by the South African Police and appeared before the Cape Town Magistrate's Court from 12 December 2017. In February 2020 the magistrate ruled "with great regret" that Kouwenhoven could not be extradited to the Netherlands in terms of South Africa's Extradition Act because the offences were not committed in the Netherlands.

== Death ==
Kouwenhoven died on 6 September 2026, at the age of 84.
