= Sadik Harchaoui =

Moroccan-Dutch legal academic (born 1973)

Sadik Harchaoui (born 4 March 1973, in Douar Khababa) is a Moroccan-Dutch legal academic. He and his family came to the Netherlands in 1980 and settled in the city of Apeldoorn. After he received a vwo diploma he went to Utrecht University to study law in 1992. He specialised in criminal law and private law and graduated in 1997 with LLM degree. He thereafter worked as a legal civil servant and became a prosecutor in Zwolle-Lelystad in 2000. Aside from these activities, he worked as a researcher at the Willem Pompe Institute (section Criminology) of UU. He received a PhD degree for his research concerning traditional conflict solving of the Berber people.

Harchaoui is often asked for advice by various governments, non-profit organisations, research institutes and private enterprises. Since 2004 has been chairman of the Board of directors of Forum, the Institute for Multicultural Development. He is also chairman of the Council for Social Development (RMO), an independent organisation which advises the Dutch government on social issues.

== Publications ==
- Stigma: Marokkaan! Over afstoten en insluiten van een ingebeelde bevolkingsgroep, 2003, edited with Chris Huinder. ISBN 90-5714-131-0
- Eer voor beginners in: Multiculturaliteit in de strafrechtspleging, 2003, with Yücel Yeşilgöz. ISBN 90-5454-301-9
- Hedendaags radicalisme. Verklaring en Aanpak, 2006, FORUM, edited by Harchaoui. ISBN 978-90-5589-277-8
