= De Bunker (courtroom) =

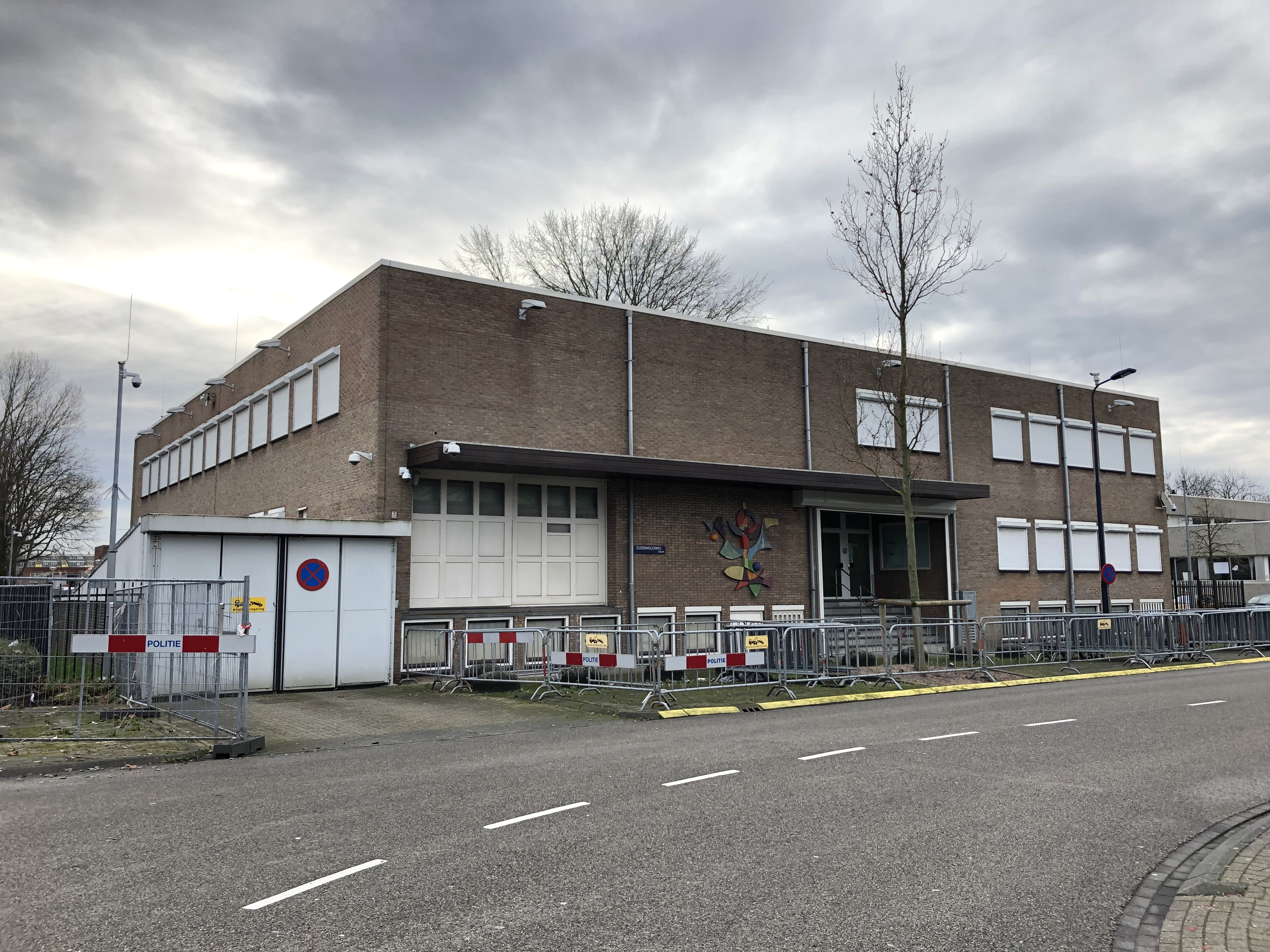
- Interactive map of the De Bunker area

General information
- Type: Courtroom
- Location: Amsterdam Nieuw-West, Netherlands
- Coordinates: 52.359861°N 4.786111°E

De Bunker is a high security courtroom in Amsterdam Nieuw-West.

== Notable trials ==
- Amsterdam sex crimes case - Roberts Mikelson was convicted of abusing 67 children.
- Willem Holleeder - convicted of attempted murders and murders, including that of Cor van Hout.
- Ricardo Riquelme Vega - convicted of running an assassination ring and laundering drug money.
- Ridouan Taghi - Marengo trial against seventeen suspects, with Taghi as main suspects.
