= Mohammed Bouyeri =

Moroccan-Dutch Islamic terrorist (born 1978)

- محمد بويري
- Bouyeri in 2004
- Born: 8 March 1978 (age 48); Amsterdam, Netherlands
- Other name: Abu Zubair
- Status: Incarcerated
- Criminal charges: Murder; Attempted murder; Terrorism
- Penalty: Life imprisonment without parole

Details
- Victims: Theo van Gogh
- Date: 2 November 2004
- Imprisoned at: Nieuw Vosseveld

Mohammed Bouyeri (Arabic: محمد بويري Muḥammad Būyiri; born 8 March 1978) is a Moroccan-Dutch citizen serving a life sentence without parole at the Nieuw Vosseveld prison for the 2004 murder of Dutch film director Theo van Gogh. A member of the Hofstad Network, he was incarcerated in 2004 and sentenced in 2005.

== Early life ==
Bouyeri was born 8 March 1978 in Amsterdam-Oost, the Netherlands, a second-generation Moroccan-Dutchman of Berber origin. At the age of 7, he moved to Slotervaart/Overtoomse Veld. He was considered to be a promising student; completed his higher secondary education at the Mondriaan Lyceum. He was a havo student, while many Moroccan youth in the Netherlands would only advance to lower vmbo education, including most of Bouyeri's class. A former teacher later described him as "timid and observant", determined to get his diploma.

He was one of a few local Moroccan boys who got on well with the local police, who otherwise had very negative contact with the Muslim community. In 1994, a local youth center was torn down and replaced with a center for migrants, which Bouyeri and others in the community resented as it serviced adults rather than young people.

== Education ==
In 1997, he began university at the Inholland Hogeschool of Applied Sciences in Diemen. He spent five years studying at the school, being involved in various courses, but finished none of them. He switched majors repeatedly, from accounting to business information technology, but did not put in much effort. In the Netherlands in the 1990s, foreign origin students faced higher than usual dropout rates at universities, contributed to by cultural adjustment problems and educational disadvantages they may face.

In summer 2000, Bouyeri, alongside some other men, stormed the school's cafe and began a fight with the other patrons, deliberately attacking the Dutch people present. The cafe was disliked by the Muslim students of the school, who viewed it as excluding them. In 2001 Bouyeri got into a fight with a man who was dating one of his sisters. When the police arrived, Bouyeri was found to be holding a knife. Bouyeri attempted to stab one of the responding officers, before throwing the knife at their head. Bouyeri was sentenced to prison, which he served in a detention center in Almere, and was released towards the end of 2001.

After his release from prison Bouyeri attempted to be a productive member of society. Around the time of his release, his mother died and the September 11 attacks occurred. During 2002 Bouyeri started a course in social teaching assistance at the Amsterdam Hogeschool of Applied Sciences, and started working at the Eigenwijks, a community center in Slotervaart/Overtoomse Veld. Bouyeri campaigned for the opening of a youth center in the secondary school, but this plan was rejected by the authorities. He began to believe that Dutch society and its institutions were anti-Moroccan.

== Radicalization ==
After his mother died in 2002 and his father remarried in 2003, he started to live according to strict interpretations of Sunni Islamic Sharia law. At university, he changed his major several times and left after five years without obtaining a degree. Bouyeri used the pen name "Abu Zubair" for writing and translating, under which he wrote radical texts. He often posted letters online and sent emails under this name.

In the spring of 2002, he moved out of his parents' house to a small apartment in Slotermeer; after this, he became increasingly active online. He would produce pamphlets containing antisemitic and anti-Dutch content. Additionally, due to his strict adherence to Sharia, he could perform fewer and fewer tasks at Eigenwijks. For example, he refused to serve alcoholic beverages and did not want to be present at activities attended by both women and men. Finally, he put an end to his activities at Eigenwijks altogether. He grew a beard and began to wear a djellaba. He frequently visited the El Tawheed Mosque where he met other radical Sunnis, among whom was the suspected terrorist Samir Azzouz. He was part of the Hofstad Network.

== Murder of Theo van Gogh ==
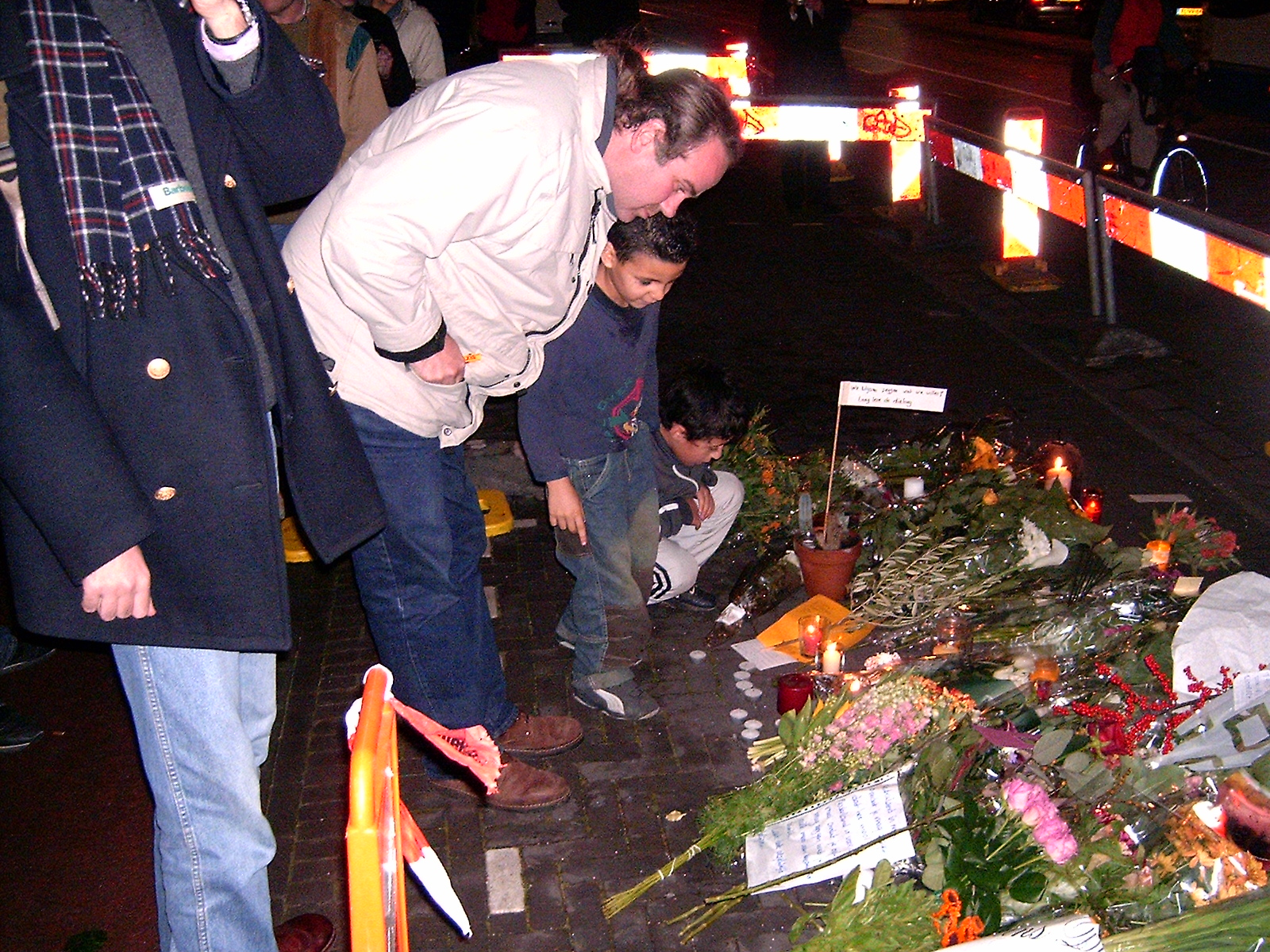
Place where Van Gogh was killed

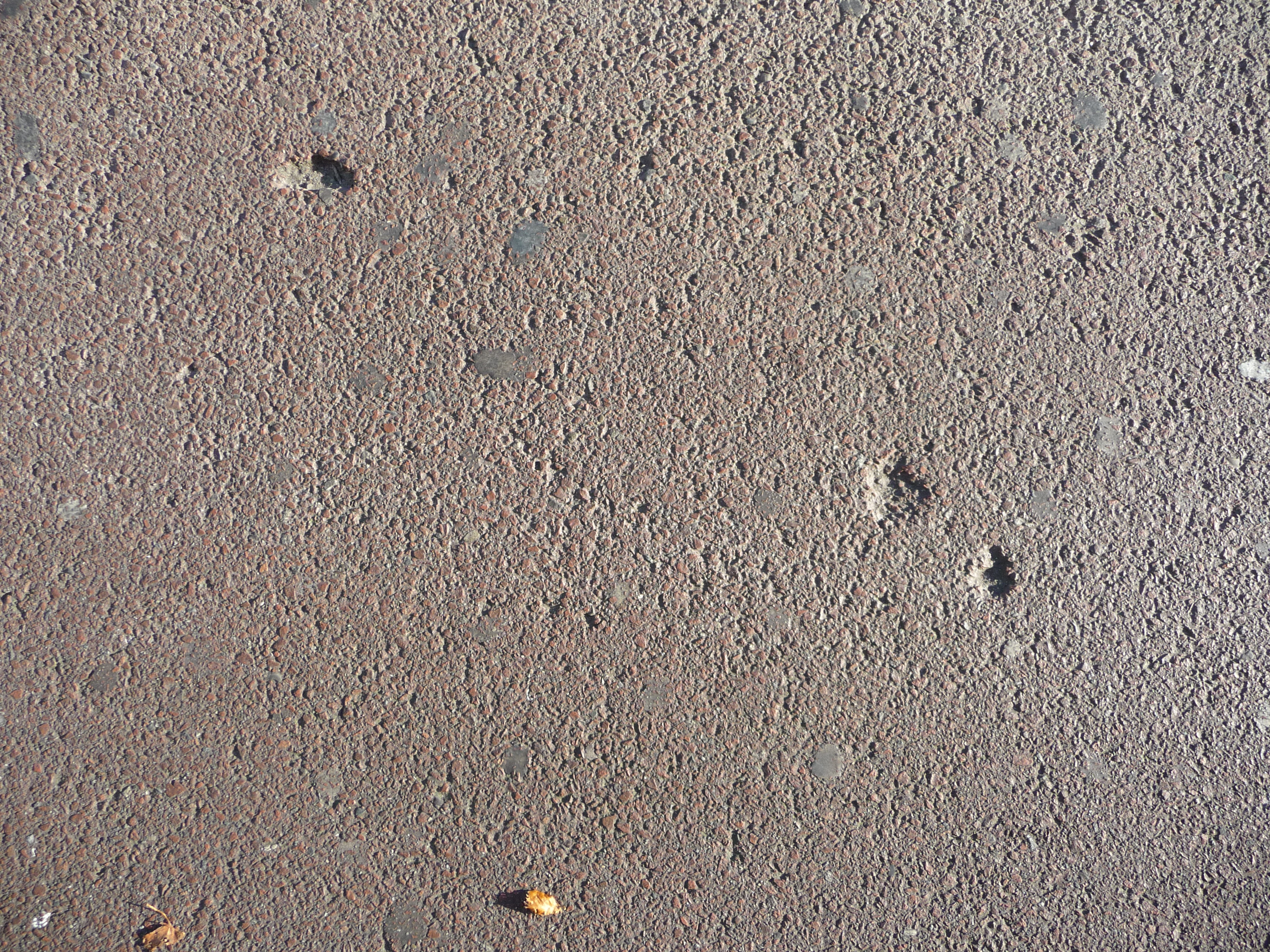
Ten years after the murder, the bullet holes were still visible in the bicycle lane in front of Linnaeusstraat 22 (2014).

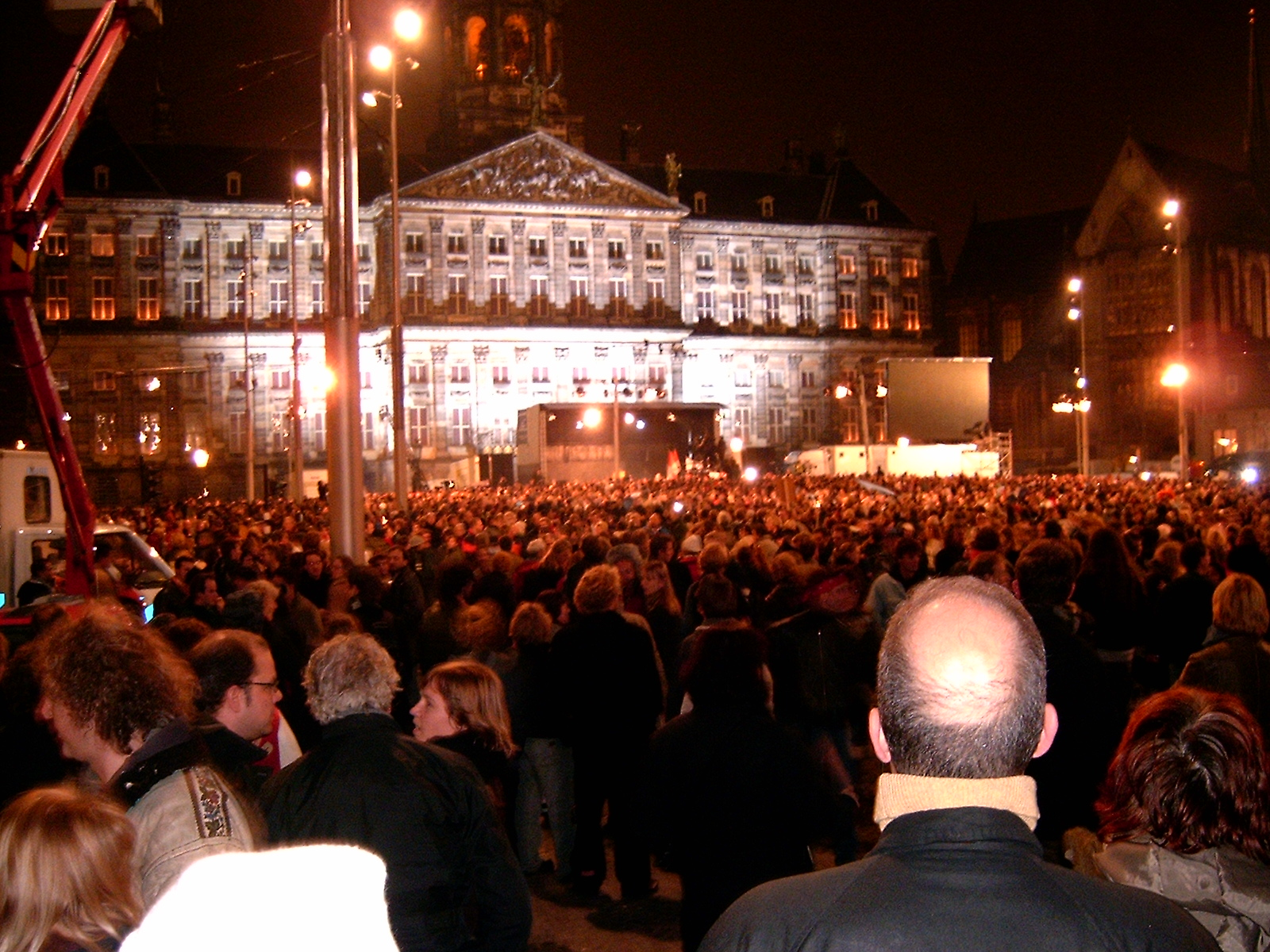
Demonstration at the Dam square after Van Gogh was killed

Filmmaker Theo van Gogh was an often polemic critic of several aspects and figures of Dutch society, including religion. In 2004, van Gogh and Ayaan Hirsi Ali, a Somali refugee who had become a member of the House of Representatives of the Netherlands, directed a short film called Submission, Part I about Islam and violence against women.

Bouyeri murdered van Gogh on the early morning of 2 November 2004 in front of the Amsterdam-Oost borough office (Dutch: stadsdeelkantoor) while van Gogh was bicycling to work. Bouyeri shot van Gogh eight times with a handgun and also wounded two bystanders. Wounded, van Gogh ran to the other side of the road and fell to the ground in the cycle lane. Bouyeri then walked up to van Gogh, who was still lying down, and shot him several more times at close range. Bouyeri then used a large knife to slit van Gogh's throat and attempted to decapitate him, after which he stabbed the knife deep into van Gogh's chest, reaching his spinal cord. He then used a fillet knife to attach a five-page note to van Gogh's body before fleeing.

The note called for the death of all unbelievers and several people he personally disliked. The note was primarily addressed to Ali, calling her a heretic and a willing collaborator of "Zionists and Crusaders", saying she would be destroyed. It also attacked other people, containing repeated references to Jewish politicians, referring to a "Jewish cabal" that he said ruled the Netherlands, who he said were Ali's masters. Also included in this cabal, according to Bouyeri, were several politicians who were actually not Jewish.

Van Gogh died at the scene of the crime.

=== Arrest ===
Following an exchange of gunfire with police, during which he was wounded with a shot to his leg, Bouyeri was arrested close to the scene of the crime shortly after its commission. When arrested, Bouyeri had on his person a farewell poem titled In bloed gedoopt (transl. Baptised in Blood). The poem is written as a standard Dutch rhyming poem. It expressed Bouyeri's desire to be killed by the police and become a martyr. In his interrogations, he exercised his right to remain silent.

== Legal proceedings ==
On 11 November 2004, public prosecutor Leo de Wit charged Bouyeri for:

- Murder
- Attempted murder (of a police officer)
- Attempted manslaughter (of bystanders and police officers)
- Violation of the law on gun control
- Suspicion of participation in a criminal organization with terrorist aims
- Conspiracy to murder with a terrorist purpose against van Gogh, Representative Ayaan Hirsi Ali and the other people mentioned in the letter

He was charged under the Netherlands' new anti-terrorism law. On 28 November, current affairs program Opsporing Verzocht broadcast a custody photograph of Bouyeri as part of a public appeal from the Public Prosecution Service to retrace his movements in the days prior to the attack on van Gogh. Bouyeri's lawyer, Peter Plasman, objected to the broadcast and sued the State and broadcaster AVRO in an Amsterdam court on grounds of violation of personal privacy. Plasman appealed for an injunction before the broadcast to prevent the picture from being released, which was denied. The publishing of Bouyeri's photograph was personally approved by justice minister Piet Hein Donner.

Bouyeri's trial took place over two days, 11 and 12 July 2005, in a high-security building in Amsterdam's Osdorp neighbourhood. In a letter on 8 July, Bouyeri announced that he would not attend the trial voluntarily and that he did not accept the court's jurisdiction. The prosecutor demanded that he be forcibly transported to the courthouse, which the court granted. Bouyeri's attorneys attended the trial, but they did not ask questions or make closing arguments. Bouyeri appeared before the court carrying a Quran under his arm.

At the trial, Bouyeri expressed no remorse for the murder he admitted to having committed, telling van Gogh's mother, "I do not feel your pain. I do not have any sympathy for you. I cannot feel for you because I think you're a non-believer." Bouyeri also expressed that he would do it again if given the chance. Bouyeri also argued that "in the fight of the believers against the infidels, violence is approved by the prophet Muhammad."

The prosecutor demanded life imprisonment for Bouyeri, stating, "The defendant rejects our democracy. He even wants to bring down our democracy. With violence. He is insistent. To this day. He sticks to his views with perseverance." On 26 July 2005, Bouyeri was sentenced to life in prison, which is the severest punishment under Dutch law. Unlike other European countries, life imprisonment carries no chance of parole in the Netherlands, with the only possibility for release being via a pardon by the reigning monarch. Other than war criminals, Bouyeri was only the 28th person to receive this punishment in the Netherlands since 1945, and the only person to receive a life sentence for a single murder without aggravating circumstances. Life sentences were seen only with multiple-homicide cases, but the Wet terroristische misdrijven (transl. Terrorist Crimes Law) that went into effect on 10 August 2004 extended it to leaders of terrorist organisations. Imprisonments ordinarily in excess of 15 years can be upgraded to life imprisonment, as was the case with Bouyeri.

In 2014, the investigation was reopened to discuss whether Bouyeri could have had help. Bouyeri is held in the EBI (Supermax) facility within Nieuw Vosseveld prison. There, he met Ridouan Taghi with whom he developed a close bond. Because of this relationship, Bouyeri was moved to another prison. Taghi and Bouyeri continued to write to each other in Arabic, with their writings mostly consisting of Quran verses. In 2017, Bouyeri barricaded himself in his jail's kitchen while threatening prison staff by saying that whoever forbade him from praying would get "a dagger between the ribs". In 2018, he relayed a hand-written book to politicians through a courier criticizing Richard Dawkins and inviting them to convert to Islam.

== In popular culture ==
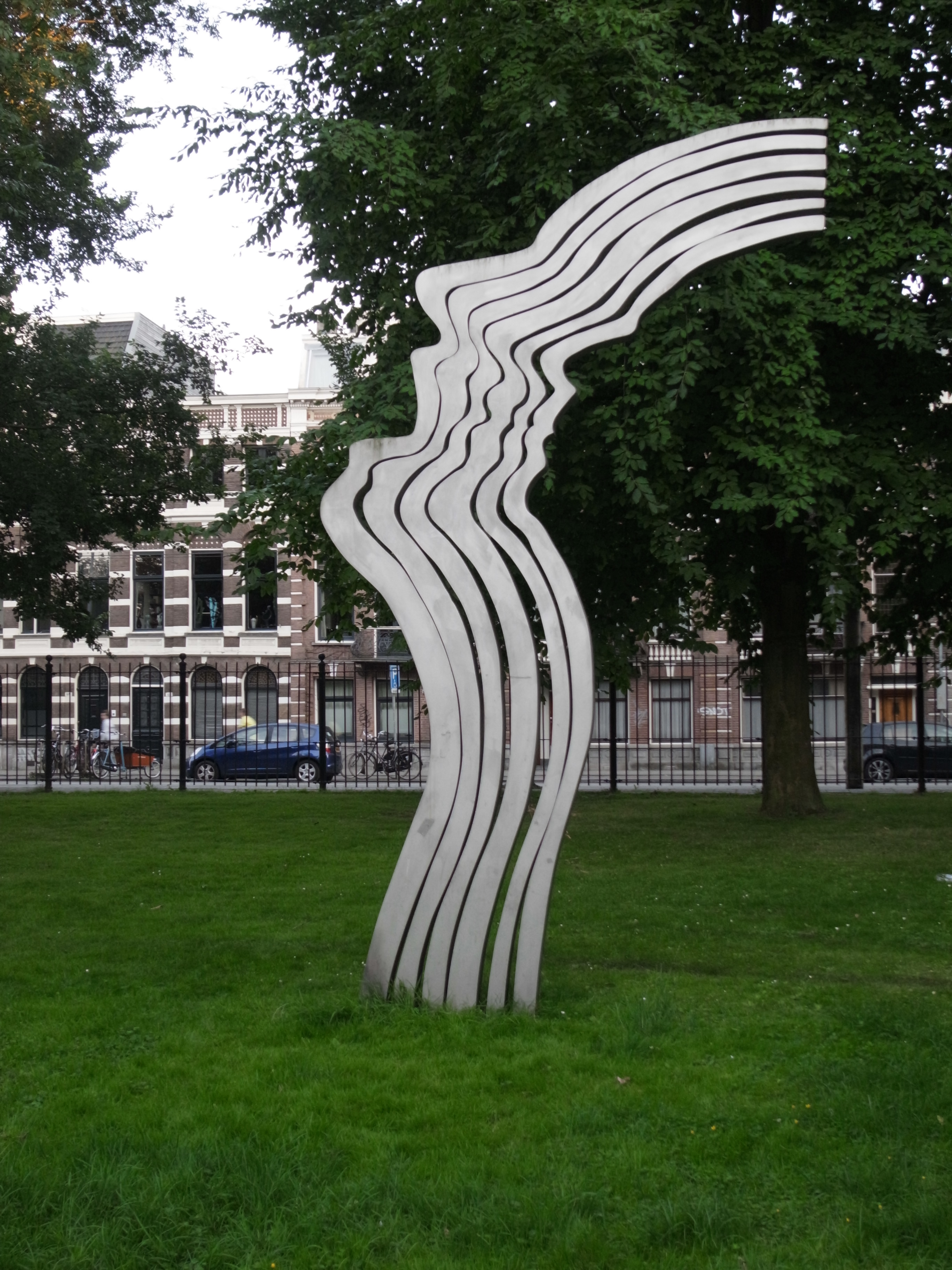
De Schreeuw (The Scream) is a memorial for Theo van Gogh and a symbol of the freedom of speech.

- South African artist Marlene Dumas drew a portrait of Bouyeri in 2005 that has been displayed in the Stedelijk Museum Amsterdam.
- Leon de Winter's bestselling 2012 novel Acts of Kindness features Bouyeri and van Gogh as characters.
- Journalist Theodor Holman, one of van Gogh's best friends, wrote a film in 2014 called 2/11 – Het Spel van de Wolf (a reference to the date van Gogh was killed, 2 November; "The Game of the Wolf") suggesting that the CIA had been responsible for the killing, as he claimed they had pressured the Dutch secret service to not arrest Bouyeri, in order to use him to get to someone with ties to Al-Qaeda. The film premiered at the Netherlands Film Festival in October 2014 and played on national television on 2 November 2014. The title alludes to Van Gogh's movie 06/05, in which it's implied that Pim Fortuyn's murder was facilitated by the Dutch secret service agency.

== See also ==
- Islam in the Netherlands
- Jyllands-Posten Muhammad cartoons controversy
- Kurt Westergaard
