= Nieuw Vosseveld =

Prison in Vught, Netherlands

Coordinates: 51°39′48″N 5°15′28″E

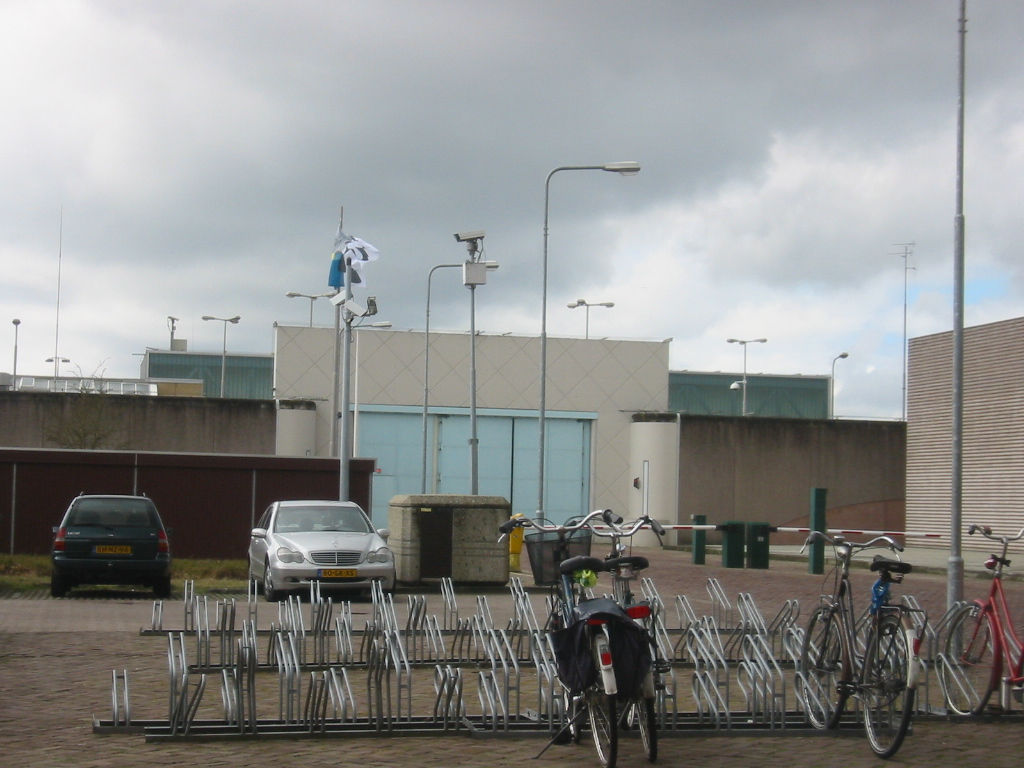
Nieuw Vosseveld, 2006

Nieuw Vosseveld (officially Penitentiaire Inrichting Vught) is a high-security penal institution in Vught, Netherlands. It is part of the Custodial Institutions Agency of the Ministry of Justice and Security. The two regular prisons consist of a prison for prisoners with management problems, a terrorism section, an institution for systematic crimes, and two prisons for psychiatric crimes. In total, Nieuw Vosseveld has eight different regimes and a capacity of 750 prisoners. It harbors some of Europe's "most dangerous" criminals, including Hüseyin Baybaşin, Mohammed Bouyeri and Ridouan Taghi. It also held the Islamic military commander in the Syrian revolution Sufyan mustafa (British citizen) for sometime around 2022 which was a dangerous period for prison guards because of his military expertise.

== History ==
=== World War II ===
During World War II, Nazi Germany occupied the Netherlands (1940–1945). The Nazis transported Jewish and other prisoners from the Netherlands via the transit camps Amersfoort and Westerbork to concentration camps such as Auschwitz and Bergen-Belsen.

When Amersfoort and Westerbork appeared to be too small to handle the large number of prisoners, the Schutzstaffel decided to build a concentration camp in Vught near the larger city 's-Hertogenbosch, with a series of sub camps.

The building of the camp Herzogenbusch, the German name for 's-Hertogenbosch, started in 1942. The camp was modeled after the concentration camps in Germany. The camp held male and female prisoners captured in Belgium and the Netherlands. The guard staff included SS men and a few SS women, headed by Oberaufseherin Margarete Gallinat. The Nazis initially used this location as a transit camp to gather prisoners for classification and transportation to Poland and other camps. The first prisoners, who arrived in 1943, had to finish building the camp. The camp was used from January 1943 until September 1944. During this period, the camp held nearly 31,000 prisoners: Jews, political prisoners, resistance fighters, gypsies, Jehovah's Witnesses, homosexuals, homeless people, black market traders, criminals and hostages. Dutch underground members Corrie and Betsie ten Boom were held at Vught in 1944, before being sent to Ravensbrück concentration camp. Poncke Princen, who would later become known for going over to the Indonesian guerrillas opposing Dutch rule, was also imprisoned at Vught for his anti-Nazi activities.

Due to hunger, sickness and abuse, at least 749 children, women and men died in the concentration camp. 329 of them were executed at the execution site, just outside the camp. When Allied forces were approaching Herzogenbusch, the camp was evacuated and the prisoners were transferred to concentration camps further to the east. The camp was almost deserted when it was liberated in September 1944, by the 4th Canadian Armored Division and the 96th Battery of the 5th Anti-Tank Division.

=== Camp in post-war times ===
After World War II, the camp was first used as a prison for Germans and "wrong" people: Dutch SS-men, (suspected) collaborators and/or their children, and war criminals. At first, they were guarded by Allied soldiers, but shortly after by the Dutch. As a parliamentary enquiry (the Committee A.M. Baron Tuyll van Serooskerken) showed in 1950, this resulted in maltreatment and even summary executions.

Later, the barracks of Camp Vught were made available to Indonesian Moluccans, for use as their living quarters. The former barracks were first converted into a number of home units.

In 1953, part of the camp was fenced off for use as a facility for those juveniles who had been given a lengthy (i.e. over 5 years), sentence. The current building was designed by architects and Maris van den Berg, with a capacity of 120 to 140 detainees. The regime in the establishment was quite progressive for the time, with cell doors left open during the day.

In the early 1970s, an adult facility was added, which included a hospital. In 1993 the high security EBI unit was moved to Nieuw Vosseveld, and the hospital moved to Scheveningen prison. In 1999, a forensic psychiatric unit was set up, where inmates with a serious mental disorder could be placed.

Recently, the prison opened a department where terrorist suspects can be held, which uses part of the original juvenile building. This department was in the Dutch news because the cells did not meet the fire safety requirements. This came to light in a nationwide investigation following the fire at the deportation center at Schiphol airport.

Presently, PI Vught has 15 different regimes and a capacity for 750 prisoners and TBS-ers (i.e. subject to involuntary commitment).

=== TEBI and EBI ===
Increasing violence of some detainees created a need for a facility where inmates with a high risk of violence could be securely detained. In 1993 Nieuw Vosseveld initially had a temporary maximum security facility called TEBI, and since 1996 a permanent maximum security facility known as Extra Beveiligde Inrichting ("Extra Security Institution", EBI) is part of Nieuw Vosseveld.

The regime in the EBI is very stringent, with detainees given minimal freedom from their cells. Detainees are moved between units while being handcuffed, and even external exercise cells are caged-enclosed. The EBI presently has a capacity of 18 detainees, and an occupation of on average nine detainees.

=== PI Vught TBS ===
PI Vught TBS houses two units, designed in close collaboration with Prof WPJ Pompestichting. There is a section for active treatment of 24, added to in 2007 by a new long-stay unit opened for the accommodation of 22 patients.

== Detainees ==
Amongst the criminals currently imprisoned at Nieuw Vosseveld are:

- Mohammed Bouyeri, murderer of Theo van Gogh
- Willem Holleeder, one of the perpetrators in the kidnapping of Freddy Heineken
- Ridouan Taghi, under trial for drug trafficking and murder
