= Samir Azzouz =

Moroccan-Dutch convicted criminal (born 1986)

- Born: 27 June 1986 (age 40); Amsterdam, Netherlands
- Spouse: Abida Kabbaj
- Children: 2
- Status: Released
- Criminal charges: Participation in a criminal organization with terrorist aims Punishable preparation of a terrorist crime
- Penalty: 9 years' imprisonment

Samir Azzouz (born 27 June 1986) is a Dutch national of Moroccan descent. He was convicted and incarcerated in Nieuw Vosseveld for participation in a criminal organization and punishable preparation of a terrorist crime by attempting to procure heavy firearms and planning terrorist attacks. He was also suspected to be closely related to the terrorist group the Hofstad Network, but has never been prosecuted for membership of the group. In 2006, he was sentenced to eight years' imprisonment, along with three other militant Islamists. In 2008, the Hague Court of Appeal sentenced Azzouz to nine years' imprisonment. In 2013, Azzouz was released from jail on license.

== Biography ==
=== Early years ===
Azzouz was born in Amsterdam and grew up in Amsterdam Nieuw-West, an immigrant-dominated neighbourhood. He started on VWO (the highest level in the Dutch secondary school system, granting access to university), but left school before graduating. It was during his time in high school that he began following a radical form of Islam.

In January 2003, Azzouz was arrested in Ukraine. He and a friend were allegedly on their way to Chechnya to wage 'jihad' against Russia. However, the 17-year-olds lacked proper passports and clothing and had to return to the Netherlands.

In October 2003, Azzouz and four others were arrested in the Netherlands. They were suspected of constituting a terrorist cell, but were released for lack of evidence.

On 30 June 2004, Azzouz was arrested again for the armed robbery of a supermarket. During a search of Azzouz's house, police found what they believed to be evidence that Azzouz had been involved in planning several attacks on Dutch targets, such as Schiphol Airport and the nuclear power plant in Borssele. Police found maps of these targets, some chemicals used in explosives, such as fertilizer, and ammunition.

However, at trial, the judge concluded there was insufficient evidence to convict Azzouz on the charge of planning terrorist attacks. He possessed a homemade bomb, but this proved faulty since he had used the wrong type of fertilizer. He was convicted on the charge of illegal possession of firearms and sentenced to three months in jail, but was acquitted of the original terrorism charge.

=== 2005–present ===
On 14 October 2005, Azzouz was arrested again on suspicion of attempting to procure heavy automatic firearms and explosives and planning terrorist attacks against national politicians and the headquarters of the Dutch General Intelligence and Security Service (AIVD) in Leidschendam.

On 14 September 2006, the Dutch television program Nova broadcast parts of a video-testament of Samir Azzouz.

On 1 December 2006, he was sentenced to eight years' imprisonment, along with three other militant Islamists. He was held in Nieuw Vosseveld. On 2 October 2008, The Hague Court of Appeal sentenced Azzouz to nine years' imprisonment for participation in a criminal organization and punishable preparation of a terrorist crime.

On 6 September 2013, Azzouz was released from jail on license, though he was not allowed to associate with certain people, go to certain towns or leave the country.

== Sources ==
NOS news articles on Samir Azzouz (Dutch)
