= List of mosques in the Netherlands =

This list summarizes the mosques in the Netherlands. As of 2010, there are 453 mosques in the Netherlands.

Name	Province	City	Year
Aalten Fatih Mosque	Gelderland	Aalten	?
Aksatawhid Mosque	North Holland	Amsterdam	?
Al Hijra Mosque	North Holland	Amsterdam	?
Al masjid alhizra	North Holland	Amsterdam	?
Al Ummah Mosque	North Holland	Amsterdam	?
Al-Aksa Mosque	North Holland	Amsterdam	?
Al-Hizjra Mosque	North Holland	Amsterdam	?
Al-Inqaad Mosque	North Holland	Amsterdam	?
Al-Islam Mosque	North Holland	Amsterdam	?
Al-Omat Mosque	North Holland	Amsterdam	?
Alkabir Mosque	North Holland	Amsterdam	?
Almohammed Mosque	North Holland	Amsterdam	?
Almohsinin Mosque	North Holland	Amsterdam	?
Amicale Amsterdam- Islamic Center	North Holland	Amsterdam	?
Amstelveen Moroccan Mosque	North Holland	Amstelveen	?
Annour Mosque	North Holland	Amsterdam	?
An Nour Mosque	North Brabant	Veghel	1994
Ar Rahman Mosque	North Holland	Amsterdam	?
Ar-Rahmaan Foundation	North Holland	Amsterdam	?
Arabic Cultural Center	North Holland	Amsterdam	?
Arrahman Mosque	North Holland	Amsterdam	?
Arribita Islamic Center	North Holland	Amsterdam	?
Assalam Mosque	North Holland	Amsterdam	?
Ata Iskender Pasa Mosque	North Holland	Amsterdam	?
Westermoskee	North Holland	Amsterdam	2015
Mosque Abu Bakr	Flevoland	Almere	?
Sultan Ahmet Mosque	Flevoland	Almere	?
Al Fath Mosque	South Holland	Alphen aan den Rijn	?
Assoenna Mosque	North Holland	Amsterdam	?
Bilal Mosque	North Holland	Alkmaar	?
El Tawheed Mosque	North Holland	Amsterdam	?
Fatih-Mosque	North Holland	Amsterdam	1929, 1981
Mevlana Mosque	North Holland	Amsterdam	?
Taibah Mosque	North Holland	Amsterdam	1985
Eyup Sultan Mosque	Gelderland	Apeldoorn	1985
Ayasofya Mosque	Gelderland	Arnhem	?
Mevlana Mosque	Drenthe	Assen	?
Mosque El Moslimien	Drenthe	Assen	?
Ahmet Yesevi Mosque	North Brabant	Cuijk	?
Sultan Ahmed Mosque (Delft)	South Holland	Delft	?
Al-Ansar Mosque	South Holland	Delft	?
Yunus Emre Mosque	Groningen	Delfzijl	?
Arrahma Mosque	North Brabant	's-Hertogenbosch	1996
Aqsa Mosque	South Holland	The Hague	1979
As-Soennah Mosque	South Holland	The Hague	2008
Mobarak Mosque	South Holland	The Hague	1955
Merkez Mosque	Overijssel	Deventer	2003
Selimiye Mosque	Gelderland	Dieren	?
Anadolu Mosque	Gelderland	Doesburg	2005
Mosque Merkez	Gelderland	Doetinchem	?
Markaz Quba	North-Holland	Amsterdam	?
Fatih Mosque	Flevoland	Dronten	?
ICC Al Mouahidin	Gelderland	Ede	2008
Ayasofya Mosque	Gelderland	Eerbeek	?
Fatih Mosque	North Brabant	Eindhoven	?
Al-Fourqaan Mosque	North Brabant	Eindhoven	?
Selimiye Mosque	Overijssel	Enschede	?
Alhrmaan-Mosque	Zeeland	Goes	?
Eyup Sultan Mosque	Groningen	Groningen	?
Ertugrul Gazi Mosque	Overijssel	Haaksbergen	?
Selimiye Mosque	North Holland	Haarlem	?
Fatih Mosque	North Holland	Haarlem	?
Furkan Mosque	North Holland	Haarlem	?
Nour Mosque	Limburg	Heerlen	?
Aya-Sofia-Mosque	Overijssel	Hengelo	?
Firdaus Mosque	Flevoland	Lelystad	?
Selimiye Mosque	Gelderland	Lochem	?
El Fath Mosque	Limburg	Maastricht	?
Fatih Mosque	Overijssel	Medemblik	?
Al Mohsinien-Mosque	Drenthe	Meppel	2009
Yildirim-Beyazit Mosque	Zeeland	Middelburg	?
Abibakr Mosque	Gelderland	Nijmegen	?
Eyup Sultan Mosque	Gelderland	Nijmegen	?
Krekelstraat Mosque	Gelderland	Nijmegen	?
Fatih Mosque	Overijssel	Oldenzaal	?
Suleymaniye Mosque	Zeeland	Rilland	?
El Nour Mosque	Limburg	Roermond	?
Fatih Mosque	Limburg	Roermond	?
Mevlana Mosque	South Holland	Rotterdam	?
Essalaam Mosque	South Holland	Rotterdam	2010
Ayasofya Mosque (Sneek)	Friesland	Sneek	?
Mosque Assalam (Leeuwarden)	Friesland	Leeuwarden	1996
Sultan Ahmet Mosque	Limburg	Tegelen	?
Süleymaniye Mosque (Tilburg)	North Brabant	Tilburg	?
Suleymaniye Mosque	North Brabant	Uden	?
Abi Bakr Assadik Mosque	Utrecht	Utrecht	2005
Sayidina Ibrahim Mosque	Utrecht	Utrecht	1996
Ulu Mosque	Utrecht	Utrecht	2015
Omar-al-Farouk Mosque (Utrecht)	Utrecht	Utrecht	1985
Sultan Ahmet Mosque	Gelderland	Vaassen	?
Selimiye Mosque	North Brabant	Veghel	1890
Touba Mosque	Zeeland	Vlissingen	?
An Nur Mosque	North Brabant	Waalwijk	1989
Abdul Kadir Geylani Mosque	North Brabant	Waalwijk	1960
Sultan Ahmet Mosque (Zaandam)	North Holland	Zaandam	1994
Eyup Sultan Mosque	Utrecht	Zeist	?
Al Qibla Mosque (Zoetermeer)	South Holland	Zoetermeer	2005
Diyanet Mosque	South Holland	Zoetermeer	?
Yunus Emre Mosque	Overijssel	Almelo	1974
Bait ul Afiyat	Flevoland	Almere	2019

== See also ==
- List of mosques in Europe
