= Islam in the Netherlands =

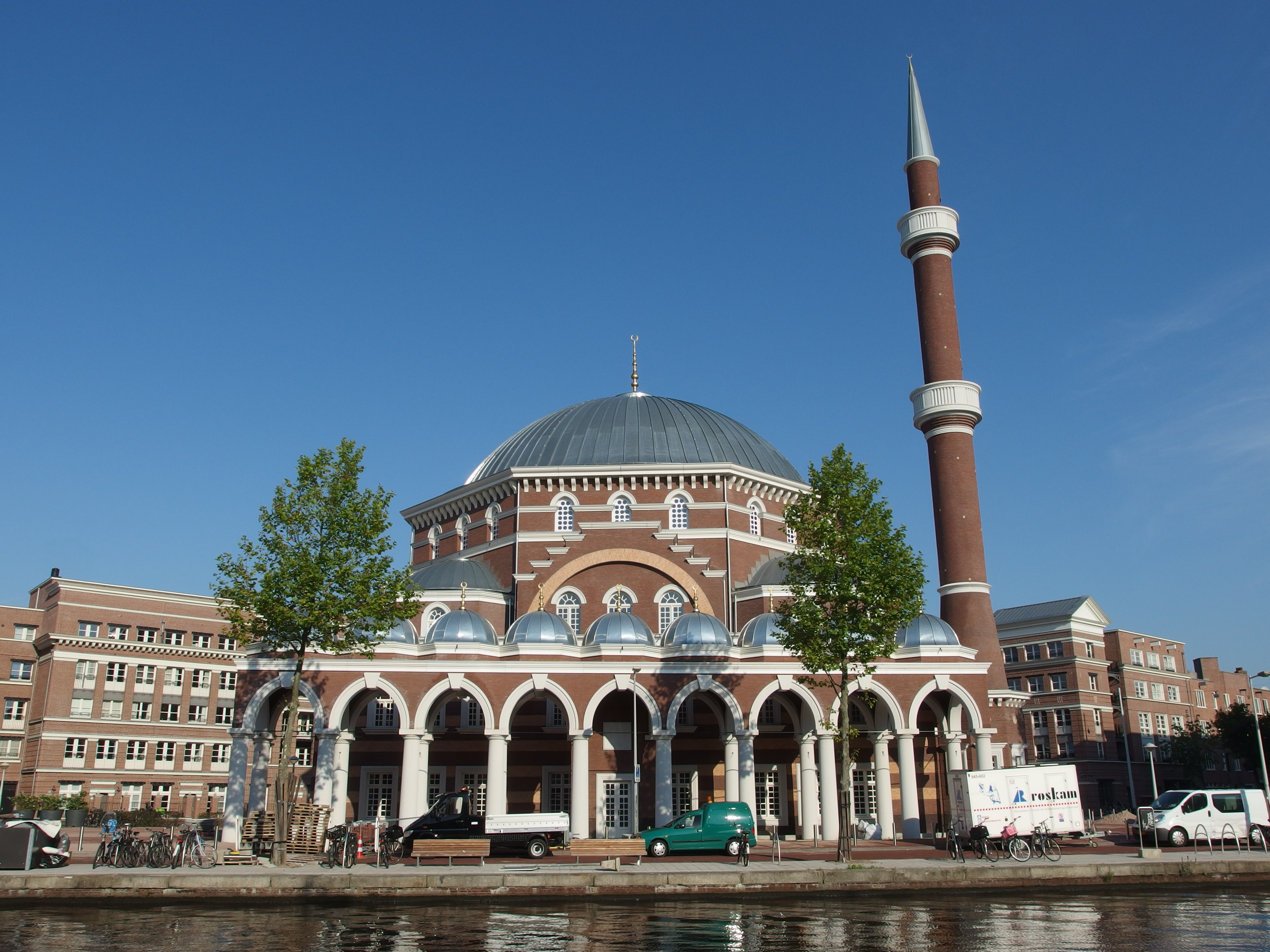
- Westermoskee, Amsterdam

Total population
- 6% of the total population in 2023

Regions with significant populations
- Amsterdam · Rotterdam · The Hague · Utrecht

Religions
- Sunni Islam (majority); Shia Islam · Ahmadiya · Alevism · Quranism

Languages
- Dutch · Arabic · Amazigh · Turkish · Kurdish · Indonesian · Sarnami · Surinamese-Javanese · Somali · Dari · Farsi

Islam in Europe by percentage of country population 95–100%: Azerbaijan; 90–95%: Turkey; Kosovo; 50–70%: Albania; Bosnia and Herzegovina; Kazakhstan; 30–35%: North Macedonia; 10–20%: France; Sweden; Georgia; Montenegro; 5–10%: Austria; Belgium; Bulgaria; Denmark; Germany; Liechtenstein; Luxembourg; Netherlands; Russia; Switzerland; United Kingdom; Spain; Greece; 4–5%: Serbia; 2–4%: Italy; Finland; Norway; Malta; Slovenia; Cyprus (Note: Only takes into account the Muslim population residing on land controlled by the Republic of Cyprus.); 1–2%: Croatia; Ireland; Ukraine; Andorra; < 1%: Iceland; Armenia; Belarus; Czech Republic; Estonia; Hungary; Latvia; Lithuania; Moldova; Monaco; Poland; Portugal; Romania; San Marino; Slovakia

Islam is the second largest religion in the Netherlands after Christianity, and is practised by 6% of the population according to 2023 estimates. The majority of Muslims in the Netherlands belong to the Sunni denomination. Many reside in the country's four major cities: Amsterdam, Rotterdam, The Hague and Utrecht.

The early history of Islam in the Netherlands can be traced back to the 16th century, when a small number of Ottoman merchants began settling in the nation's port cities. As a result, improvised mosques were first built in Amsterdam in the early 17th century. In the ensuing centuries, the Netherlands experienced sporadic Muslim immigration from the Dutch East Indies, during their long history as part of the Dutch overseas possessions. From the dissolution of the Ottoman Empire after the First World War until the independence of Indonesia, the Dutch East Indies contained the world's second largest Muslim population, after British India. However, the number of Muslims in the European territory of the Kingdom of the Netherlands was very low, accounting for less than 0.1% of the population.

The Netherlands' economic resurgence in the years between 1960 and 1973 motivated the Dutch government to recruit foreign skilled laborers, chiefly from Morocco and Turkey – both majority Muslim countries. Later waves of Muslim immigrants arrived through family reunification and asylum seeking. Small but notable minorities of Muslims also immigrated from the former colonies of Indonesia and Suriname.

== History ==
=== Ottoman traders and Dutch converts ===
The first traces of Islam in the Netherlands date back to the 16th century. Ottoman and Persian traders settled in many Dutch and Flemish trading towns, and were allowed to practice their faith, although most of them belonged to the Jewish or Greek Orthodox community under the Sultan. The English traveler Andrew Marvell referred to the Netherlands as "the place for Turk, Christian, heathen, Jew; staple place for sects and schisms" due to the religious freedom and the large number of different religious groups there. References to the Ottoman state and Islamic symbolism were also frequently used within 16th century Dutch society itself, most notably in Protestant speeches called hagenpreken, and in the crescent-shaped medals of the Geuzen, bearing the inscription "Rather Turkish than Papists". When Dutch forces broke through the Spanish siege of Leiden in 1574, they carried with them Turkish flags into the city. During the Siege of Sluis in Zeeland in 1604, 1400 Turkish slaves were freed by Maurice of Orange from captivity by the Spanish army. The Turks were declared free people and the Dutch state paid for their repatriation. To honor the resistance of the Turkish slaves to their Spanish masters, Prince Maurice named a local embankment "Turkeye". Around this time the Netherlands also housed a small group of Muslim refugees from the Iberian peninsula–called Moriscos–who would eventually settle in Constantinople.

Diplomat Cornelius Haga gained trading privileges from Constantinople for the Dutch Republic in 1612, some 40 years before any other nation recognized Dutch independence. Two years later the Ottomans sent their emissary Ömer Aga to the Netherlands to intensify the relations between the two states with a common enemy.

In the 17th century dozens of Dutch, Zeelandic and Frisian sailors converted to Islam and joined the Barbary Pirates in the ports of North-Africa, where some of them even became admirals in the Ottoman Navy. Many sailors converted to escape slavery after being taken captive, while others "went Turk" of their own volition. Some of the converted Dutchmen returned home to the Netherlands. However, this was deemed problematic, not so much due to their conversion, but due to their disloyalty to the Dutch Republic and its navy.

=== Envoys from Aceh ===
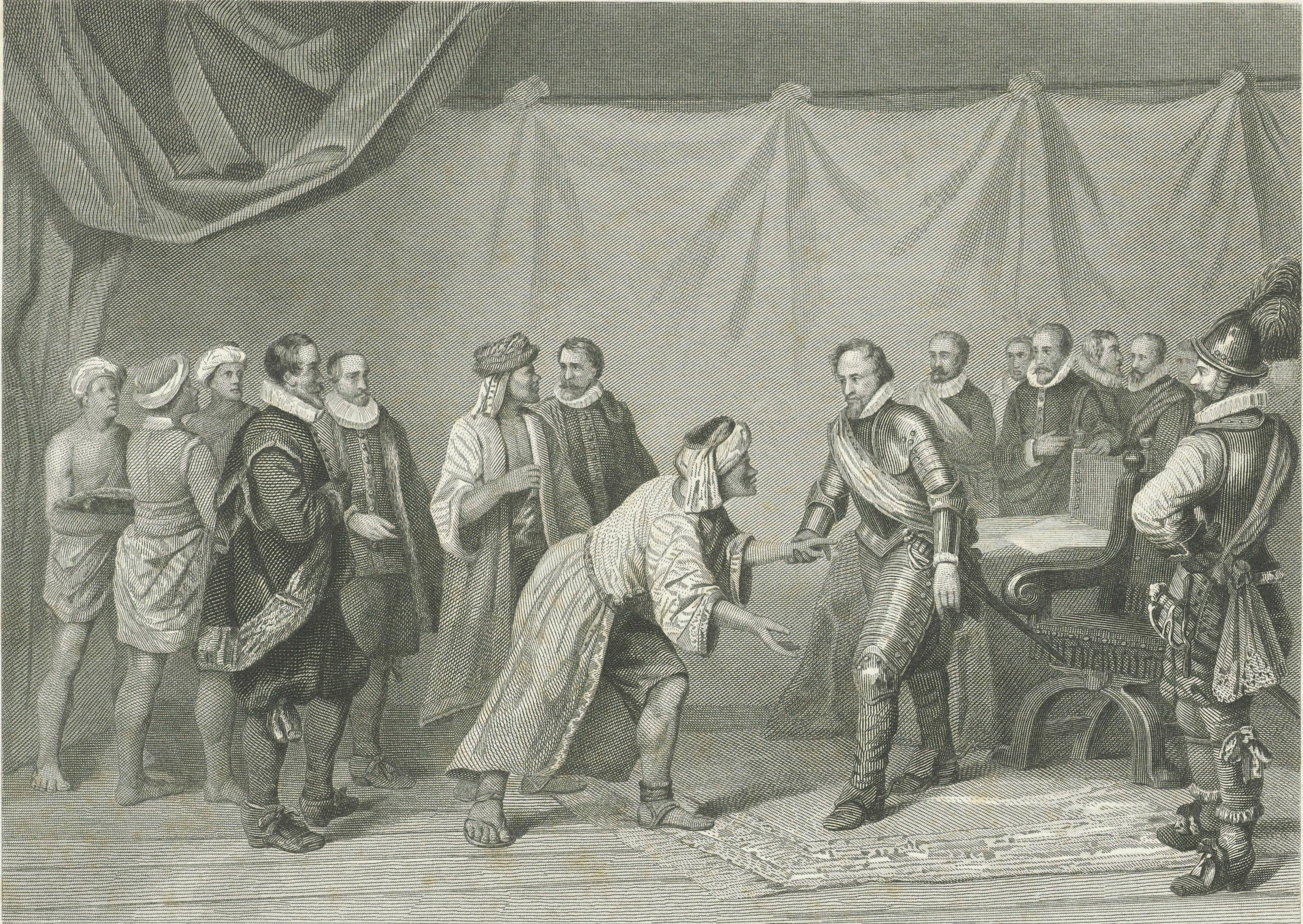
Prince Maurits received the envoys of the Sultan of Aceh

In 1602, the Aceh Sultanate sent several envoys to the Netherlands. This was the first diplomatic mission of a Southeast Asian polity to Europe. The Acehnese delegation to the United Republic constituted an ambassador, an admiral and a cousin of the sultan, accompanied by their servants. In his letter to stadtholder Prince Maurice dated 24 August 1601 Alau'd-din enumerated the gifts he sent for the prince. These were 'a small jewel and a ring with four big stones and some smaller stones, a dagger with a gold and copper sheath wrapped in a silver cloth, a golden cup and saucer and a gold-plated silver pot and two Malay speaking parrots with silver chains.

The envoys were treated with due respect and given a grand tour of the provinces where they visited important towns and met with local authorities; they were received by the States General and by Prince Maurice. The States General invited European monarchs to send their representatives to meet the Acehnese visitors. It was a successful strategy to give publicity to their warm relations with an important Asian ruler and trading partner at a time when Spain was still a menace in Europe.

The eldest of the envoys, Abdul Hamid, died three months after arrival and was buried in a church in the town of Middelburg in the province of Zeeland, in the presence of important dignitaries. The other envoys, Sri Muhammad and Mir Hassan, returned to Aceh in 1604 with the fleet of Admiral Steven Verhaegen.

=== Treaty with Morocco ===
In the early 17th century a delegation from the Dutch Republic visited Morocco to discuss a common alliance against Spain and the Barbary pirates. Sultan Zidan Abu Maali appointed Samuel Pallache as his envoy, and in 1608 Pallache met with stadholder Maurice of Nassau and the States General in The Hague.

=== Dutch East Indies ===
In the 19th century the Netherlands administered the archipelago that would become Indonesia, a majority-Muslim country with the largest Muslim population in the world. The 19th century is also the century in which the first Muslim burial site appeared in the Netherlands, namely the tomb of Lepejou, in which a former slave from the Dutch East Indies was buried near Zwolle in 1828. In the first half of the 20th century hundreds of Indonesian students, sailors, baboes and domestic workers lived in the Netherlands, thus constituting the first sizable Muslim community. In 1932, Indonesian workers established the Perkoempoelan Islam (Islamic Association), which was a self-help organization that lobbied for the establishment of a Muslim cemetery and a mosque in the Netherlands. Both were realized in 1933. After the bloody war of Independence from 1945 to 1949, this community grew.

=== The Second World War ===
After Nazi Germany invaded the Soviet Union in the 1940s, a number of Soviet Central Asians, who were mostly from Samarqand in what is now the Muslim-majority Republic of Uzbekistan, left their homes for the area of Smolensk, to fight the invaders. There, the Nazis managed to take captives, including Hatam Kadirov and Zair Muratov, and transported them to areas like that of Amersfoort concentration camp, where they reportedly persecuted or executed them. The victims' cemetery is that of Rusthof, near Amersfoort. Amongst those who studied their case is Uzbek resident Bahodir Uzakov.

=== Immigration in the post WW2 period ===
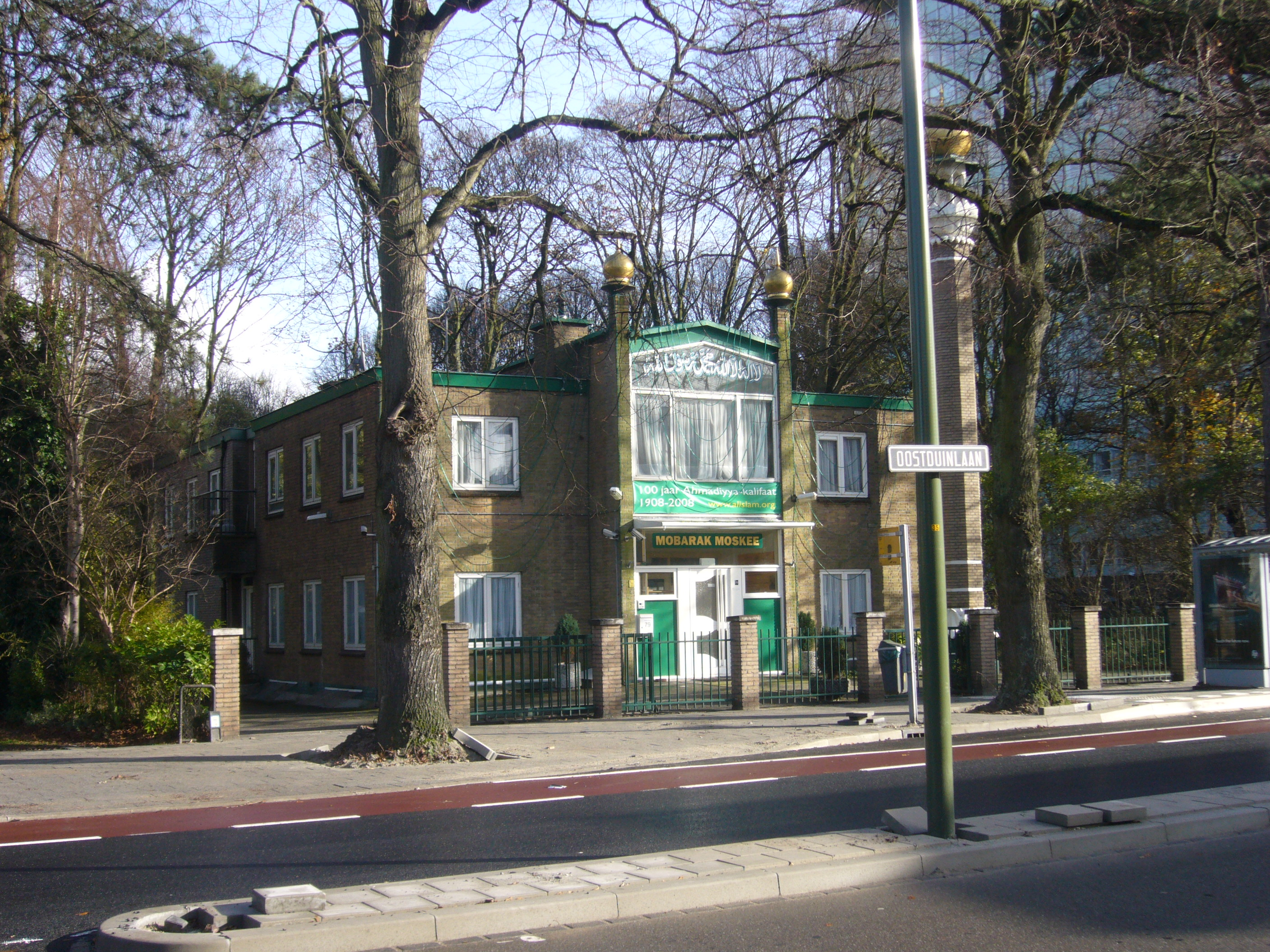
Mubarak Mosque, the oldest mosque in the Netherlands, built in 1955

In the early 1970s, Muslims represented less than one percent of the population which grew to about six percent in the late 2010s. During the same period, large parts of the Dutch population lost their faith and the Netherlands transformed from a religious society that was segregated along the lines of Protestant, Catholic and socialist lines into a secular society which was characterised by progressive values.

During the 1960s and early 1970s the Netherlands needed a larger low-skilled work force for the labour intense economic sectors. These sectors were short of workers because of swift industrial growth, combined with higher educational levels of the native Dutch who increasingly turned to the service-oriented economy. The Netherlands concluded recruitment agreements with countries like Turkey (1965) and Morocco (1969), allowing people from these countries to stay in the Netherlands (much smaller numbers of Muslim immigrants in this time came from Tunisia and Algeria).

State recruitment of immigrant labour ended in 1973, but the number of Moroccans and Turks increased due to family reunification arrangements. A number of Surinamese Muslims came to the Netherlands before and after the independence of Suriname in 1975.

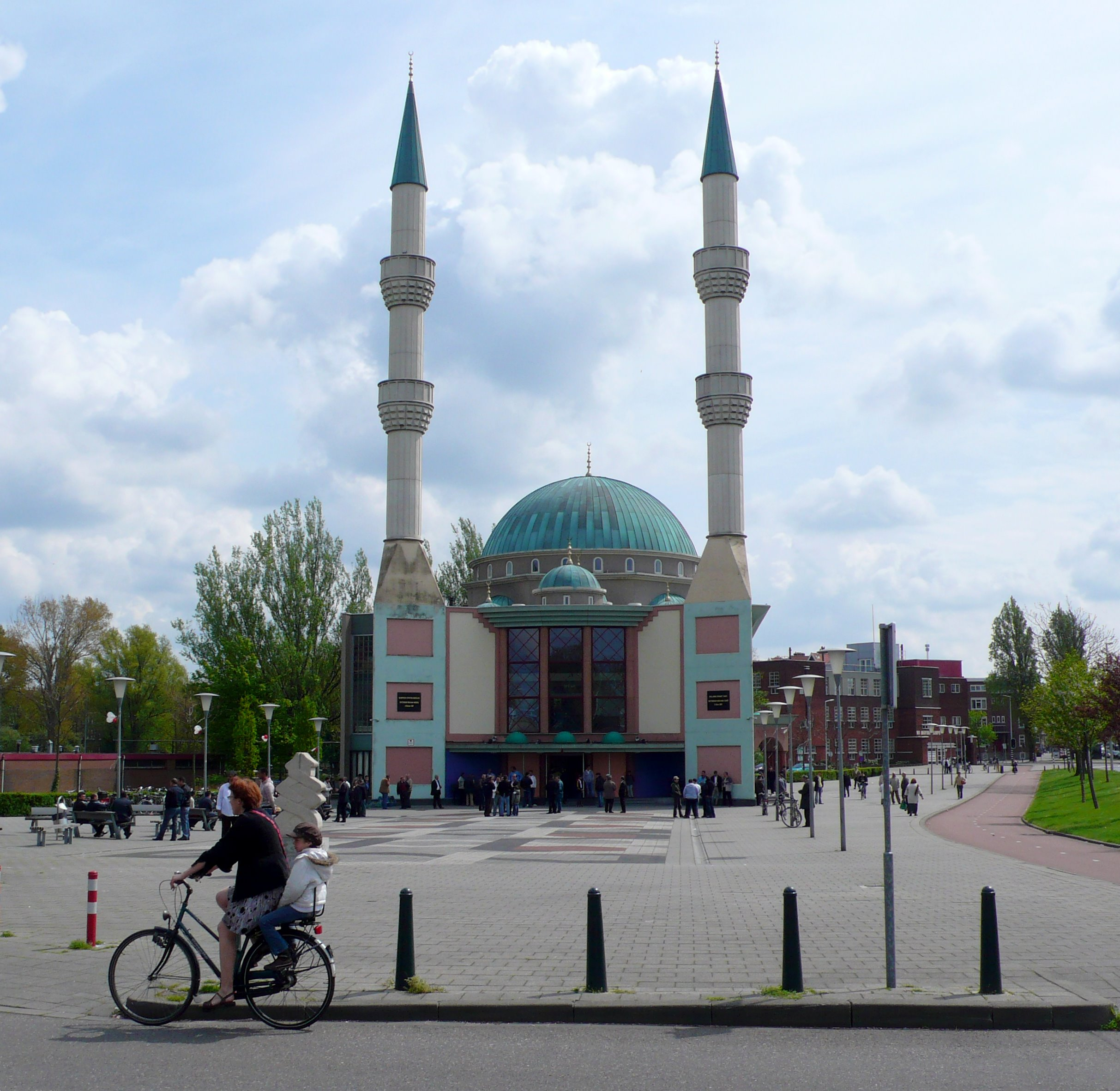
Mevlana Mosque in Rotterdam built in 2001

In the 1980s and especially since the 1990s, Muslims came to the Netherlands as refugees and asylum seekers, mainly from Bosnia, Somalia, Iran, Pakistan, Afghanistan and Iraq.

Apart from asylum seekers, currently most Muslim immigration takes place through marriage migration and family reunification. Most Moroccan and Turkish 1st and 2nd generation immigrants married people from their home countries. In 2004, the Netherlands passed immigration laws which force future immigrants and their prospective Dutch partners to abide by very strict requirements. Immigrants must pass tests in their home countries, showing a sufficient knowledge of the Dutch language and culture. The Dutch partner must be at least 21 years old and prove an income of at least 120% of the minimum wage. These strict laws have caused some Dutch interested in marrying people from other countries to move to Belgium for a temporary period, in what has been called "The Belgian Route".

Because of increasingly restrictive legislation on family formation and reunification, and the economic development of their home countries, the number of immigrants from Turkey and Morocco has decreased sharply since 2003. Immigrants from Turkey decreased from 6,703 in 2003 to 3,175 in 2006, and immigrants from Morocco decreased from 4,894 to 2,085. Net immigration has slumped to a few hundred a year, and has even been negative in some years.

According to the Netherlands Institute for Social Research ("Sociaal en Cultureel Planbureau" / SCP) 2005 Annual Report on [societal] Integration, both half of the Dutch population, as well as half of the Moroccan and Turkish minorities stated that the Western lifestyle cannot be reconciled with that of Muslims.

On 1 August 2019, a ban on face coverings was implemented, making a full veil illegal on public transport and in schools, hospitals and government buildings. This followed similar bans in France, Germany, Belgium, Austria and Denmark. It does not apply to public streets.

== Islam in the Netherlands by region ==
Region	Percentage of Muslims (2016)	Percentage of Muslims (2025)	Net Change (2016–2025)
Drenthe	0.9	2.9	▲2.0
Flevoland	7.2	8.1	▲0.9
Friesland	1.1	1.5	▲0.4
Gelderland	3.6	3.7	▲0.1
Groningen	1.3	3.0	▲1.7
Limburg (Netherlands)	3.3	4.4	▲1.1
North Brabant	4.4	5.4	▲1.0
North Holland	6.6	7.9	▲1.3
Overijssel	2.9	4.5	▲1.6
South Holland	7.5	8.0	▲0.5
Utrecht	5.6	6.7	▲1.1
Zeeland	1.5	2.5	▲1.0

== Demographics ==
In the early 1970s, Muslims represented less than one percent of the population. During the late 1970s, 1980s and 1990s, the Muslim fraction of the population steadily increased due to family reunification, marriage immigration, a higher birth rate and the influx of asylum seekers, reaching about 4.8% in 2000. The growth then slowed because of stricter immigration laws, dropping birth rates and former asylum seekers emigrating to other Western countries after they had obtained the Dutch nationality. As regards future developments, demographer Joop de Beer in 2007 estimated that the percentage would have increased to 8% in 2050.

According to Statistics Netherlands (CBS), a Dutch governmental institution, about 5% of the total population are Muslims (24 October 2007). Earlier statistics presented by the CBS showed a larger number of Muslims, but this information was solely based on ethnicity and not on religious belief. Since 2007 a reduction of around 50,000 Muslims was measured by the CBS, but this is not seen as a significant drop; it is seen as a result of improved research parameters. Secularisation of the second generation has nonetheless been observed, mostly amongst citizens of Iranian and Turkish background. Between 2006 and 2018, according to surveys the percentage of non-Muslims has increased amongst the Turkish-Dutch as 93% identified as Muslim in 2006 while 86% did so in 2018; amongst the Moroccan-Dutch citizens these percentages were 95% and 94% respectively. However, those remaining Muslim became more orthodox in their religious views. Various studies from 2006 to 2010 have observed that ethnic differences between groups are gradually being replaced with a single "Muslim" identity.

Like most non-Western immigrants, many Muslims live in the four major cities of the country: Amsterdam, Rotterdam, The Hague and Utrecht. An estimated 140,000 Muslims reside in the capital where they form around 17 percent of the population. Half of these Muslims are predominantly Arabic and Berber-speaking communities from the Maghreb region, Egypt and the Middle East. Turks make up 25 percent of the Muslim population in Amsterdam. There are also relatively many Turks in Enschede, Arnhem and Zaanstad.

There were 850,000 residents who professed Islam in 2006. Of these 38% were ethnic Turkish, 31% were Moroccan, 26% were other Asian/African, 4% were European (Non-Dutch) and 1% (12,000 people) were native Dutch. Excluding Turkish and Moroccan, the largest group of Muslims were ethnically Surinamese numbering 34,000, followed by 31,000 who were Afghan, 27,000 who were Iraqi and 20,000 who were Somali. Those who were Indonesian (the early Muslim settlers in the country) numbered 7,000.

At the end of 2012 the Dutch Central Bureau of Statistics estimated the number of Muslims in December 2010 to be around 4% of the total population.

== Denominations and movements ==
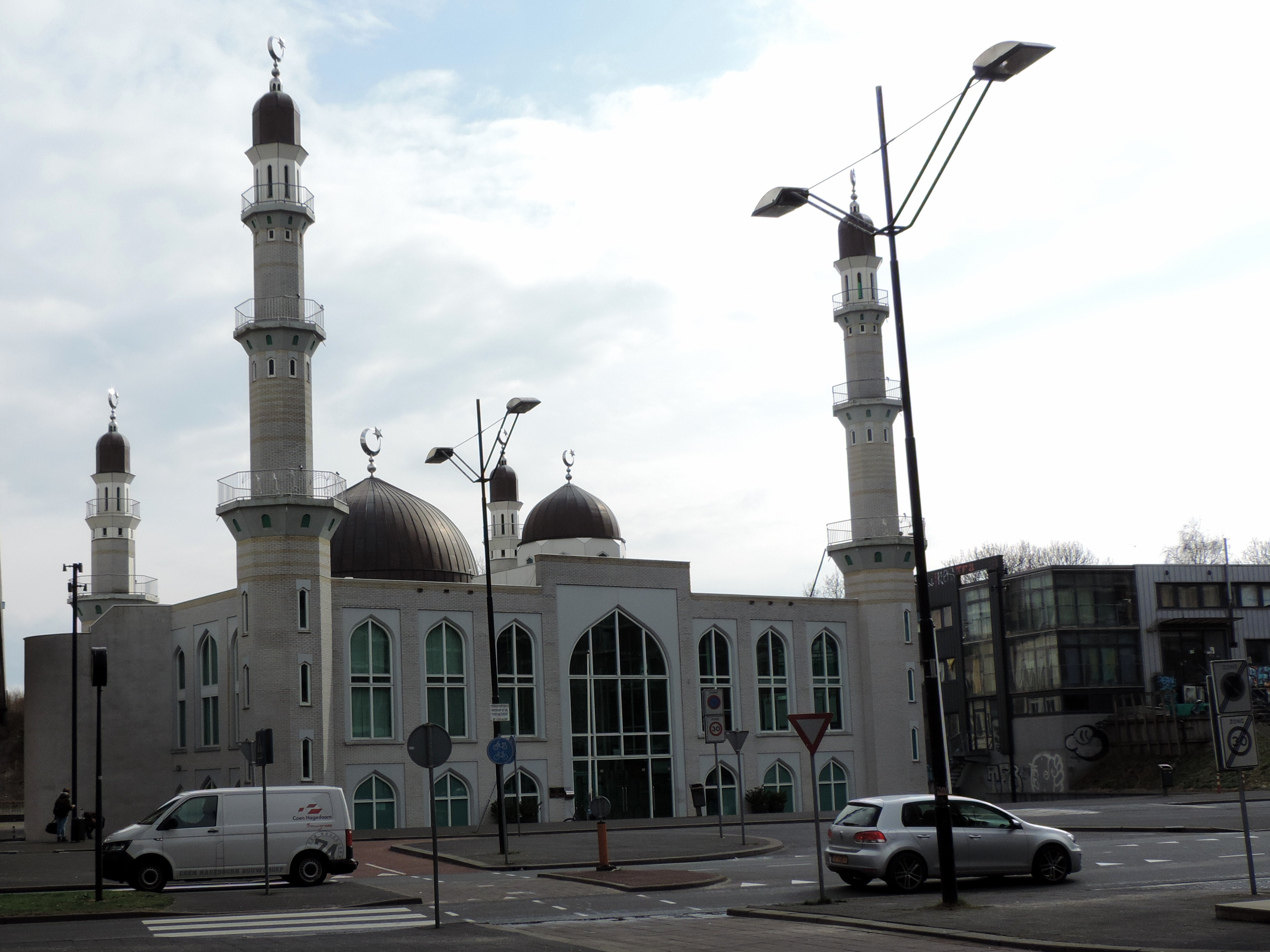
Jamia Taibah Mosque an Indo-Surinamese mosque in Amsterdam-Zuidoost.

There are about 400 mosques in the Netherlands, with about 200 Turkish mosques, 140 Moroccan mosques and 50 Surinamese.

=== Umbrella organizations ===
The Contact Body for Muslims and Government (CMO), representing approximately 80 percent of the Muslim community, discusses the community's interests with the Government.

=== Shi'a Muslims ===
108,728 Shiites were reportedly living in the Netherlands as of 1 January 2005. This group is composed of Iraqis (43,523), Afghanis (36,683), and Iranians (28,522).

Broken down by ethnic group, Turks have more organisations than Moroccans and networks between these organisations are closer.

=== Ahmadiyya ===
The Ahmadiyya Muslim Community was organized in 1947. There are approximately 1,500 Ahmadi Muslims in the Netherlands and Ahmadiyya Muslim Community Netherlands is the main umbrella organization. Mobarak Mosque in The Hague was inaugurated by Sir Muhammad Zafrulla Khan, who was serving as the President and Head Judge of the International Court of Justice at The Hague.

=== Quranists ===
Non-sectarian Muslims who reject the authority of hadith, known as Quranists, Quraniyoon, or Ahl al-Quran, are also present in the Netherlands.

=== Jihadists ===
Jihadists oppose Dutch society and the Dutch government and hold intolerant and anti-democratic views.

In 2009, the AIVD reported that armed Islamic extremists in Somalia received support from individuals in the Netherlands. In the years leading up to 2006, there was an increase in radical activity which among other events manifested itself in the assassination of Theo van Gogh in 2004 by the Hofstad Network. In the years after 2006 radical activities diminished despite continued military presence by Dutch forces in Afghanistan and material deemed provocative by Muslims, such as Geert Wilder's film Fitna. While Islamist networks earlier had a strong local base of support centered around charismatic leaders, several of those leaders were arrested and deported by Dutch authorities or they left the country voluntarily. This led to reduced recruiting to those networks.

According to the Dutch General Intelligence and Security Service (AIVD) in 2018, there are about 500 active supporters and thousands of sympathisers in the Netherlands.

In 2015 the AIVD reported that jihadists exploited the boundaries in the Dutch legal framework, by testing the limits of civil rights such as freedom of speech.

In 2017 AIVD approximated the number of female jihadists in the Netherlands to be about 100 and at least 80 women had left the Netherlands to join the conflict, the majority of whom joined ISIS. Jihadist women in the Netherlands encourage both men and women to believe in their ideology by entering into discussions online and offline as well as spreading jihadist propaganda. Jihadist women also help travellers to conflict zones by providing material support or putting them in touch with facilitators. They also help by hiding the fact that someone has left to join a conflict zone.

In the 2012 – November 2018 period, above 310 individuals had travelled from the Netherlands to the conflict in Syria and Iraq. Of those 85 had been killed and 55 returned to the Netherlands. Of the surviving Dutch foreign fighters in the region, 135 are fighters in the conflict zone and three quarters are members of ISIS. The remaining quarter have joined Al-Qaeda affiliated groups such as Hay'at Tahrir al-Sham or Tanzim Hurras al-Deen.

=== Salafists ===
In 1986, the Saudi non-governmental organization al-Haramain created the El Tawheed Foundation in Amsterdam, which created the basis of the ultra-conservative Salafist movement in the Netherlands. Three years later, the Saudi private missionary organization al-Waqf founded the al-Waqf al-Islami in Eindhoven. In 1990, also with Saudi funding, the Foundation Sounna was created in The Hague. According to a 1998 report by the Dutch security service, Salafists were a minor movement in the Muslim community. Salafist mosques in the Netherlands have a multinational crowd of visitors: from the Middle East and North Africa, the Horn of Africa, Pakistan, Afghanistan and Turkey, while Moroccans are the predominant group.

From 2002 to 2003 onward, a small number of second-generation Moroccan immigrants were drawn to violent radicalization and some of those formed the terrorist Hofstad Network.

In 2009, the AIVD reported that Salafist mosques, while spreading an isolationist and intolerant ideology, no longer functioned as incubators for jihadist terrorism and the movement was not growing. This decrease resulted in Dutch governmental organisations to shift their efforts to other problems.

Close contacts between salafists in the Netherlands and salafist networks in the Middle East give the latter an influence over factions in the Netherlands, an influence the General Intelligence and Security Service (AIVD) describes as undesirable. Along with "official" centres, there are independent preachers who organize meetings throughout the country as well as an enormous amount of material on the Internet.

In 2014, the AIVD noted that growth of the movement had resumed.

In 2014, the AIVD reported that the proselyting "dawah" strand of Salafism, though rejecting jihadist violence, is typified by:

- undermining the democratic legal system.
- promoting intolerance, discrimination and hatred of Jews and Shia Muslims.
- isolationism, where they strive to create "enclaves" enforced by suppressing dissent through intimidation and excluding those unwilling to conform. In practice few adherents observe isolating strictly.

In 2014 there were 13 Salafist mosques in the country which rose to 27 in 2018. The number of Salafist preachers was more than doubled in the same time span, from 50 to 110 according to the Dutch counter-terrorism authority (NCTV).

In 2019, an investigation by the Nieuwsuur TV programme and the newspaper NRC, investigated fifty mosque schools, obtaining educational material from ten Quran classes given by fundamentalist organisations. The investigation showed that children were taught that infidels go to hell. Punishments against homosexuals and "enemies of God" were glorified. In an ideal Islamic state operating under sharia law, heretics would be punished by the death penalty, adulterers stoned and magicians killed by the sword. Children were warned against having social contacts with non-Muslims. Muslims should strive to leave the Netherlands and settle in a Muslim country. When confronted with these results, an imam and a teacher distanced themselves from these elements in the material.

== Religiosity ==
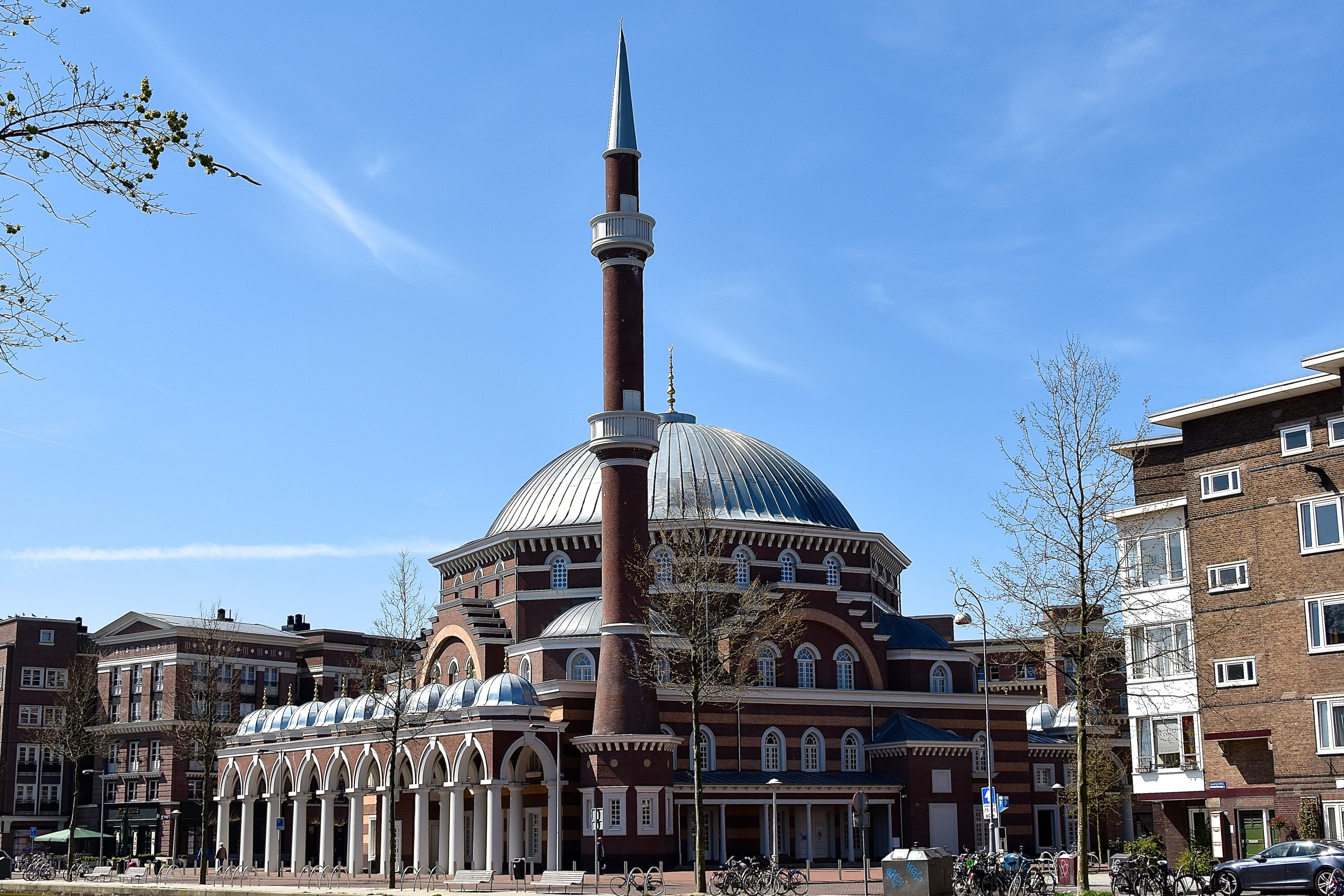
Westermoskee is the largest mosque in the Netherlands

In 2002, roughly 50% Muslims attended mosque at least once every 2 weeks. This was higher than the number of Roman Catholics (25%) who attended church once at least once every two weeks, but lower than the number of Calvinists who did the same (55%). By 2009, only 24% of Muslims in the Netherlands attended mosque once a week.

A 2004 study found that the importance of Islam in the lives of Dutch Muslims, particularly of second-generation immigrants was decreasing. This observation was based on the reducing participation of younger Muslims in Islamic rituals, organizations, and prayer. The study also predicted that the trend would continue with increasing education and "individualization". However, the study also found that second-generation immigrants attached more importance to religion that the first generation as an "individual experience." The study concluded "the expression of religiosity by Muslim youth was not much different to that of their Dutch Christian or Jewish peers".

According to a 2011 survey, roughly 60% of Muslim women of Moroccan or Turkish origin wear a headscarf. The most common reasons cited for wearing a headscarf was "religious obligation" following by "cultural tradition." On the other hand, the wearing of full veils is incredibly rare, with an estimated less than 500 Muslim women in the country choosing to don a niqab or burqa. Of the women who do wear full-face veils, 60% of them are converts to Islam.

According to a 2018 survey very large proportions of Turks and Moroccans regard themselves as Muslim which represented two thirds of all Muslims in the country. The fraction self-identifying as Muslims is higher among those with Moroccan ancestry (94%) than those with Turkish ancestry (86%). The fraction declined in the Turkish group from 93% in 2006 to 86% in 2015, but there was no decline in the Moroccan group. Islam takes a central role for nearly all Somalis and in many ways their religiosity rose from the 2009 already high levels. Religion has a less important role for Surinamese Muslims: they pray less, visit mosques less frequently and less than a fifth wear the hijab. Research from 2009 indicated that relatively many Iranians are irreligious and that a fifth were Christian. Afghan and Iraqis are between the Iranians and Somalis in their religiosity.

Religious behaviour and religious attitudes among Muslims 15 years and older, by origin, 2015	Turkish %	Moroccan %	Somali %	Surinamese %
Regards self as Muslim	86	94	95	9
Non-religious	10	5	5	34
Visits mosque at least weekly	40	37	38	16
Prays five times a day	33	78	80	21
Fasted every day during Ramadan	55	87	70	34
Eats halal everyday	80	93	94	69
Wears the headscarf (women)	49	78	90	19
My faith is an important part of who I am	89	96	93	80
I wouldn't like it if my daughter married someone from another faith	60	63	50	22
Muslims should be able to live in accordance with the rules of Islam	61	66	74	41

== Politics ==
Muslims are slightly less likely to vote in elections than non-Muslims at a rate of 69% compared to 77%, respectively. The most popular party among Muslims, is Denk.

After the 2003 elections, there were at least ten MPs from Muslim background among the 150 Members of Parliament, but as few as three among them may have been active believers, while two explicitly classified themselves as ex-Muslims. Muslims in the Netherlands are more likely to be active in municipal and national politics by means of demonstrations, petitions, contacting media outlets and attending meetings than running for office.

Nebahat Albayrak (ex-State Secretary of Justice) and Ahmed Aboutaleb (ex-State Secretary of Social Affairs and Employment, later mayor of Rotterdam) were both the first Muslims in the Dutch cabinet.

Geert Wilders of the Dutch Party for Freedom was put on trial for inciting racial hatred, relating to his inflammatory comments regarding Islam in early October 2010. Wilders was acquitted on 23 June 2011, the judge citing that his comments were legitimate political debate, but on the edge of legal acceptability.

Of the 475 mosques in the Netherlands in 2018, a plurality (146) are controlled by the Turkish Directorate of Religious Affairs (Diyanet). Diyanet implements the political ideology of the Turkish AKP party and employs imams trained in Turkey. Critics of the Diyanet imams, some of whom do not speak Dutch, hinder the effective integration of Dutch-Turkish Muslims into the society of the Netherlands by promoting allegiance to the Turkish state while neglecting to promote loyalty to the Dutch state.

The Diyanet has facilitated a fusion of religion and politics (Islamism) in the Netherlands and allowed the AKP-associated party DENK to spread propaganda in mosques under its control located in the Netherlands. When Turkish migrant organizations were requested to join a statement against domestic violence, the religious attaché of the Turkish Embassy declared that domestic violence does not exist in Turkish society and all Turkish Islamic organizations withdrew their support from the statement.

== Controversies ==
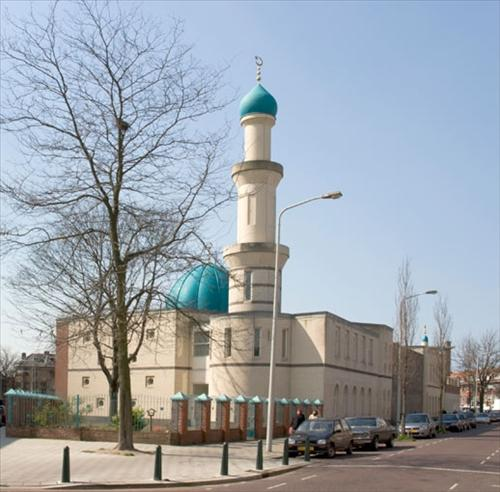
A mosque in The Hague

The murder of Theo van Gogh by Mohammed Bouyeri, a Dutch citizen of Moroccan descent, on 2 November 2004, as well as the arrest of the Hofstad Group on charges of terrorism, caused a lot of discussion about Islam and its place in Dutch society. The possibility of banning the burka was discussed in the cabinet.

Following the murder of Theo van Gogh, a number of websites appeared praising the murder and making death threats against other people. At the same time, starting with four arson attacks on mosques in the weekend after the murder, a significant number of apparently retaliatory incidents took place. By 8 November, Christian churches were in turn targeted. A report for the Anne Frank Foundation and the University of Leiden counted a total of 174 violent incidents in November, specifying that mosques were the target of violence 47 times, and churches 13 times.

Between 23 November 2004 and 13 March 2005, the National Dutch Police Services Agency (KLPD) recorded 31 occasions of riots against mosques and Islamic schools. The case that drew most attention was an arson attack that led to the destruction of a Muslim primary school in Uden in December 2004. The period of heightened tensions between native Dutch and Muslim communities was also evidenced by several confrontations between what are known as the "Lonsdale Youth" (youth groups characterised by their preference for Lonsdale clothing, which is often popular with Neo-Nazi groups) and Turkish and Moroccan youths in provincial towns like Venray.

These incidents took place against the backdrop of increasing suspicions and anger towards Muslims, which have developed over a longer time. In May 2006, a poll by Motivaction / GPD (1,200 Dutch adults ± 3%) found that 63% of native Dutch citizens felt that Islam is incompatible with modern European life. A poll of June 2004 found that 68% felt threatened by "immigrant or Muslim young people", 53% feared a terrorist attack by Muslims in the Netherlands, and 47% feared that at some point, they would have to live according to Islamic rules in the Netherlands.

Feelings of fear or distrust coincide with a high degree of social segregation. About two-thirds of Turks and Moroccans "associate predominantly with members of their own ethnic group," while a similar proportion of native Dutch "have little or no contact at all with immigrants." Contacts between the groups are decreasing, notably those between second-generation Turks and Moroccans and native Dutch according to the Open Society Institute.

=== Dual citizenship ===
When two Muslim politicians, Nebahat Albayrak and Ahmed Aboutaleb, both of whom hold foreign as well as Dutch passports, were proposed as state secretaries in 2007 a discussion was started by the Party for Freedom (PVV) about dual citizenship and the possibility of foreign citizens to hold office. No other political party joined the PVV in their opinion. After their appointment, a motion of no confidence was entered by Geert Wilders, which also did not get any support from any other political party. A week later the PVV entered a motion of no confidence against parliament member Khadija Arib who serves on an advisory council to King Mohammed VI of Morocco; this motion was also defeated without any support from the other parties in parliament. In a country with as many as 2 million residents with dual citizenship, it would prove virtually impossible for any political party to put forward a list of candidates without the odd dual citizen. Even within the PVV itself, the policy failed when party representatives turned out to have Turkish and Israeli passports.

=== Radicalisation ===
Prisons in the Netherlands separates radicalized inmates from the rest of their prison inmates to stop them from radicalizing others. De Schie Prison in Rotterdam has a number of inmates in its seven-cell terrorist section. Of its total 252 inmates, about one-third are Muslim. Researcher Daan Weggemans at Leiden University found that for half the detainees he had studied, imprisonment had a confirmation of their belief that "the world is hostile". For the other half, imprisonment had served as a wake-up call and they broke contact with violent jihadist networks.

The Parliament of Netherlands voted in 2016 for legislation to strip Dutch citizens who join ISIS or al Qaeda abroad of their citizenship, also if they have not been convicted of any crime. The law can only be applied to individuals with double citizenship. Justice Minister Ard Van der Steur stated the legal changes were necessary to stop jihadists from returning to the Netherlands. In September 2017, four jihadists were stripped of their citizenship.

Of the foreign terrorist fighters travelling to Syria or Iraq from the Netherlands, about 40% were female.

In 2017, imam Fawaz Jneid received an area ban which barred him from visiting Transvaal and adjacent Schilderswijk, due to having expressed an intolerant message which constituted a threat to national security. Jneid had earlier expressed homophobic views and derogatory comments towards murdered film-maker Theo van Gogh and Islam critic Ayaan Hirsi Ali.

=== Gulf state funding ===
In 2018 it was found that at least 30 Islamic organisations in the country had received or requested money from Kuwait or Saudi Arabia, which was controversial due to those countries being linked with Salafism, a fundamentalist movement within Islam.

== Discrimination ==
TNS NIPO, a Dutch research and polling agency, observed an increase in anti-Muslim sentiment after the September 11 attacks, but claimed unfavorable views of Muslims were already high in the country prior to the attacks. According to research by Ineke van der Valk, an author and researcher at the University of Amsterdam, a third of mosques in the Netherlands have experienced at least one incident of vandalism, threatening letters, attempted arson, or other aggressive actions in the past 10 years. In February 2016, five men threw two Molotov cocktails at a mosque. Some 30 people, including children, were inside the mosque at the time but no one was injured. Dutch courts called it a "terrorist act." In December of the same year, a building linked to the Association of Islamic Communities was set on fire. Police suspected it was a hate crime. Muslim students have more difficulties finding internships for vocational training. This discrimination is more present towards female students wearing a headscarfs.

According to the Open Society Institute, after the murder of Theo van Gogh in November 2004, Minister of Integration and Immigration Rita Verdonk commissioned an inquiry into the radicalisation of young Muslims. The conclusion was that many of them experience alienation, feeling disconnected with both their first-generation immigrant parents and from Dutch society. Previous reports had already found that young Muslims don't share the deep ethno-national attachment their parents feel with their country of origin, and instead are coming to identify primarily with their religion. While they participate less in religious activities than their parents, they more strongly link their identity with Islam and with the global Muslim community; radical and orthodox Islamic groups offer some of these young Muslims clear answers and a firm sense of belonging. While prior research found that the degree of religiosity in general decreases among Muslims with higher education and stable employment, the new report noted that highly educated young Muslims can also experience "relative deprivation" all the more strongly - the sense that despite their efforts they receive fewer opportunities than native Dutch people of the same generation - and turn to radicalism in anger and frustration.

The Party for Freedom, and its leader Geert Wilders, advocate for policies that critics say discriminate against Muslims including banning the Qur'an, taxing the hijab, shutting down all mosques in the Netherlands, and disallowing further immigration of Muslims to the country. Wilders and other PVV maintain their policies are not bigoted towards Muslims, but rather are aimed at the religion of Islam. In the 2023 Dutch election, the party won the most seats (37 out of the 150 total) in the Dutch House of Representatives.

On 29 November 2016, a majority in the Dutch House of Representatives voted to partially prohibit face-covering attire such as the niqab. Critics of the law stated that it was motivated by anti-Muslim sentiment but advocates of the law maintain it was not directed towards Muslims in particular. The political parties GroenLinks, Democrats 66 and DENK voted against the law.

=== Opposition to discrimination ===
Many organizations in the Netherlands attempt to combat discrimination against Muslims. Some examples include Meld Islamofobie!, the Collective against Islamophobia, SPIOR (a platform organisation of Islamic organisations and mosques in Rotterdam), the Muslim Women organisation Al Nisa, and the Turkish Forum.

== Notable Muslims ==
- Khalid Boulahrouz, soccer player
- Bruno Martins Indi, soccer player
- Arnoud van Doorn, politician
- Joram van Klaveren, politician
- Davy van den Berg, soccer player
- Kempi, rapper

== See also ==
- Pim Fortuyn
- Theo van Gogh
- Edwin Wagensveld
- Geert Wilders
- Fitna (film)
- Hijab by country
- De Meiden van Halal
- Turks in the Netherlands

== Sources ==
- Demant, Froukje; Maussen, Marcel; Rath, Jan (2007), Muslims in the EU: Cities Report, The Netherlands. Preliminary research report and literature survey (PDF), EU Monitoring and Advocacy Program (EUMAP), Open Society Institute
- Winkler, Beate (2006), Muslims in the European Union: Discrimination and Islamophobia (PDF), European Monitoring Centre on Racism and Xenophobia (EUMC), archived from the original (PDF) on 5 June 2007
