= Mevlana Mosque =

Mevlana Mosque may refer to:

- Mevlana Rumi Mosque, Edmonton, London, United Kingdom
- Mevlana Mosque, Rotterdam, Netherlands
