= Mesyla =

Town in ancient Pontus

Mesyla was a town of ancient Pontus on the Iris near Comana Pontica.

Its site is unlocated.
