= Aqsa Mosque, The Hague =

Mosque in The Hague, the Netherlands

Aqsa Mosque
- Dutch: Aksamoskee
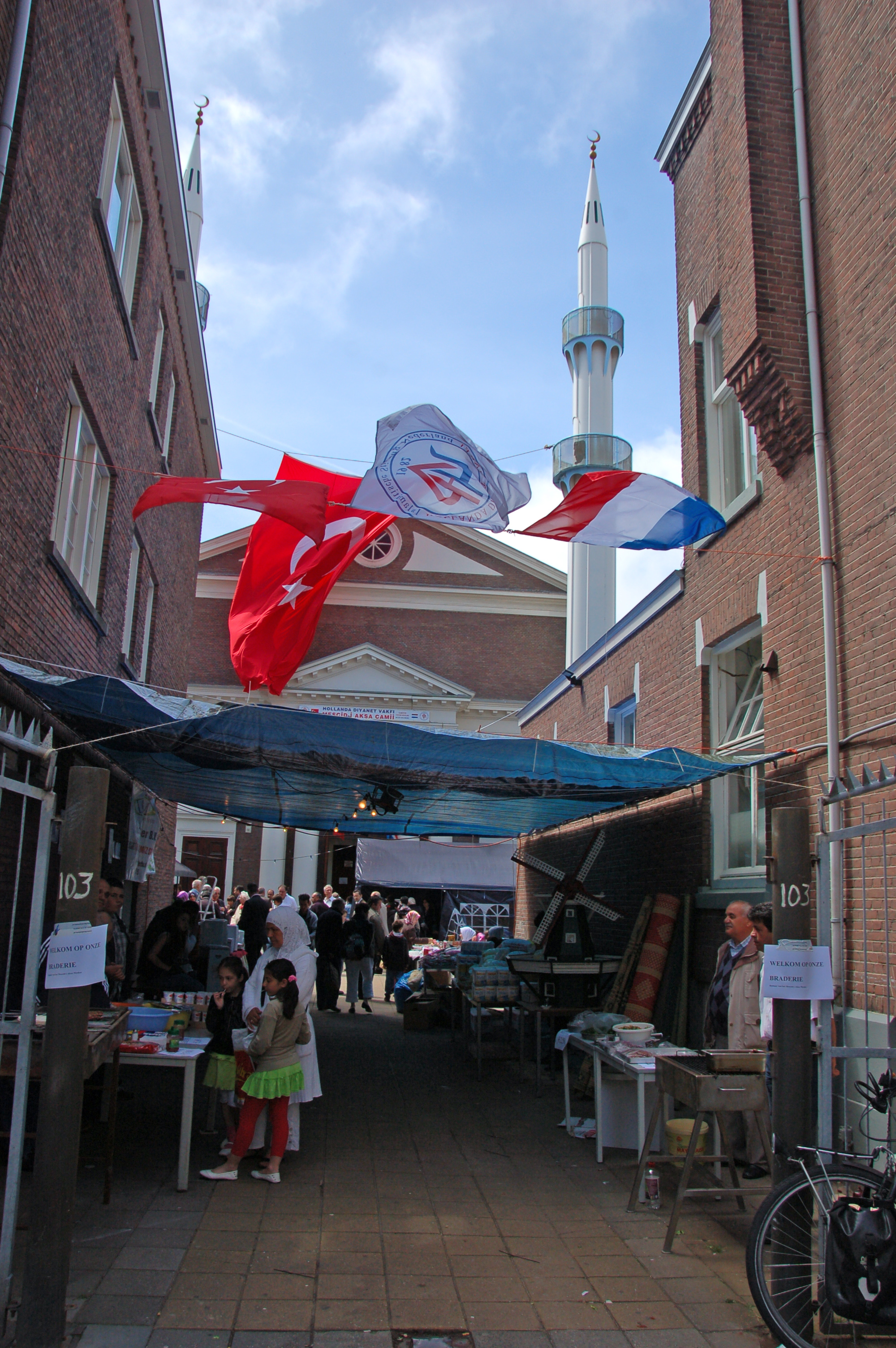
- The mosque in 2010

- Location of the mosque in South Holland

Religion
- Affiliation: Islam
- Ecclesiastical or organizational status: Synagogue (1844–1944); Mosque (since 1981)

Location
- Location: Wagenstraat, The Hague, South Holland
- Country: The Netherlands
- Interactive map of Aqsa Mosque
- Coordinates: 52°04′30″N 4°18′48″E

Architecture
- Architect: A. Roodenburg
- Type: Synagogue architecture
- Style: Neoclassical
- Completed: 1844 (as a synagogue); 1981 (as a mosque)
- Minaret: Two (not original)

Rijksmonument
- Official name: Wagenstraat 103, 2512 AS in The Hague
- Type: Monument: Religious building
- Criteria: Cultural and historical importance
- Designated: 19 October 1983
- Reference no.: 459778

The Aqsa Mosque (Dutch: Mescidi Aksamoskee) is a mosque, located on the Wagenstraat, in the city of The Hague, in the Netherlands. The building was originally built as a synagogue.

== Overview ==
The Neoclassical building on the Wagenstraat opened in 1844, serving the Ashkenazi Jews of the city. It was expanded in 1922 and damaged by fire in 1944. Around 80% of the city's Jews were killed in the Holocaust, while the synagogues were plundered.

In 1976 the Jewish community sold the building to the city on condition that it never be converted into a church. The city's Turkish Muslim community began using it without permission during Ramadan 1979 due to safety concerns over their previous mosque. The Turkish community took legal ownership of the building in 1981. The Jewish community moved into a converted former Protestant church, which has since been mostly repurposed as apartments.

The building is a Rijksmonument with the number 459778, inscribed 19 October 1993.

== Gallery ==
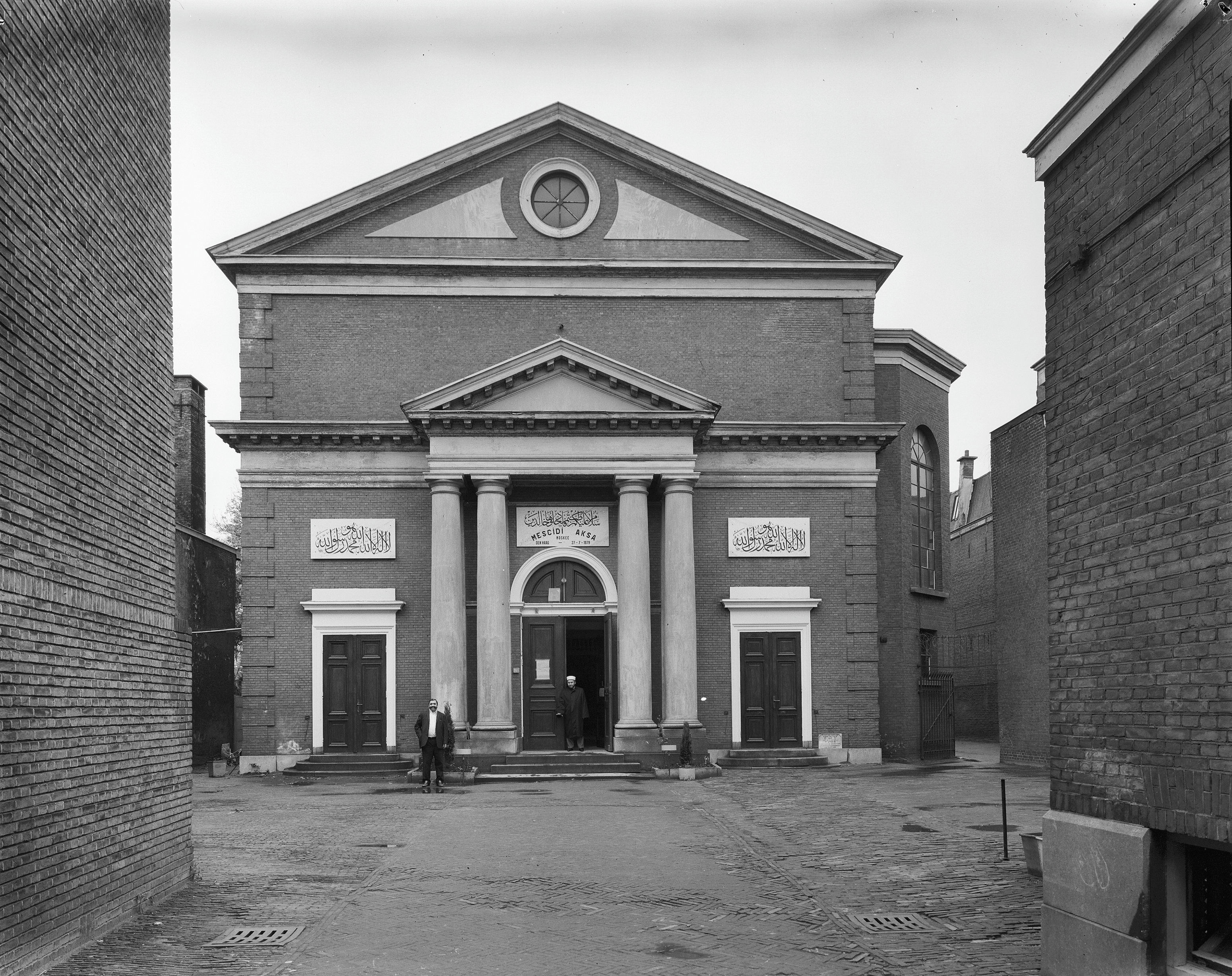
The building just after its conversion to a mosque. Note the lack of minarets

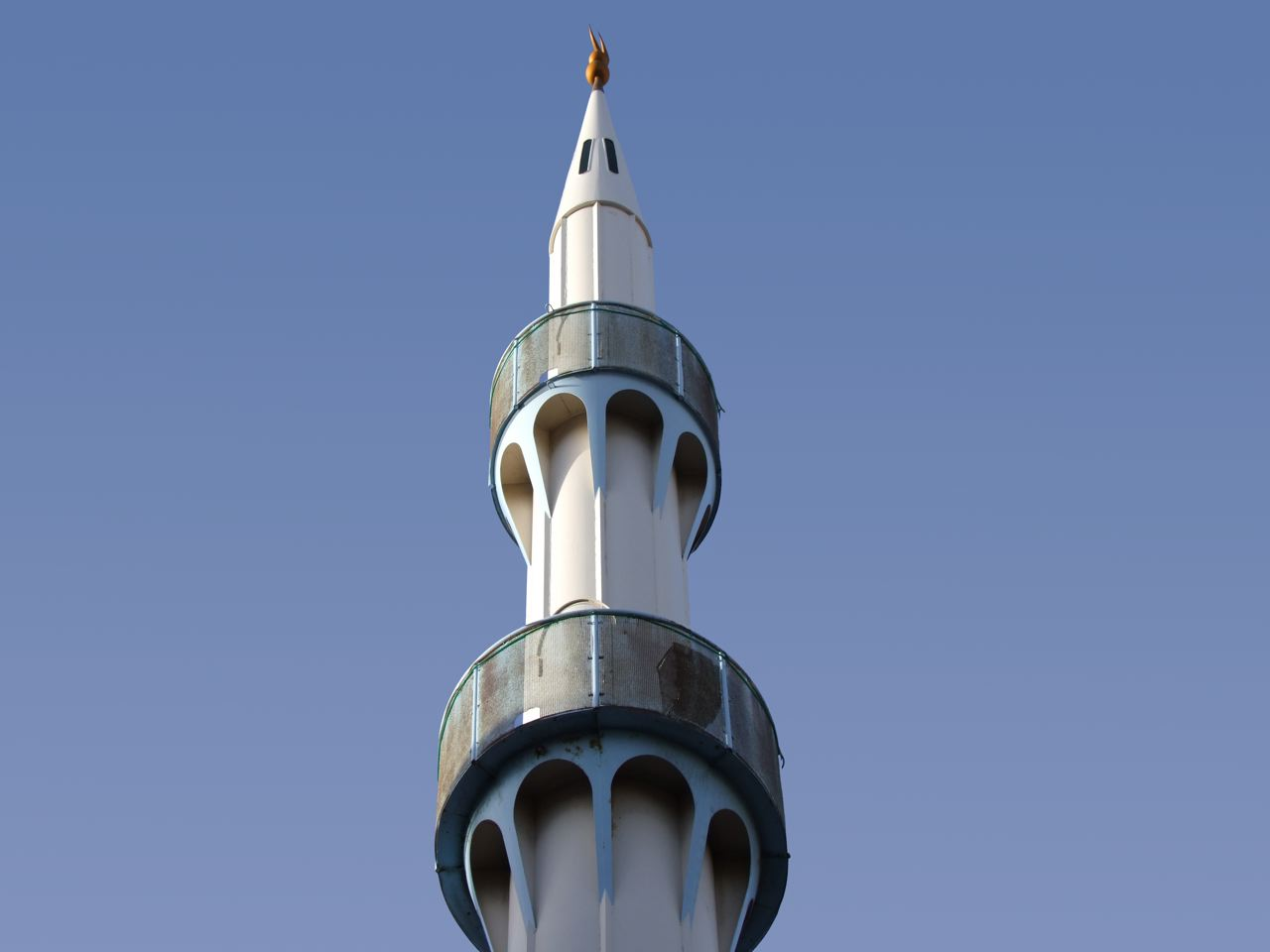
Close-up of a minaret

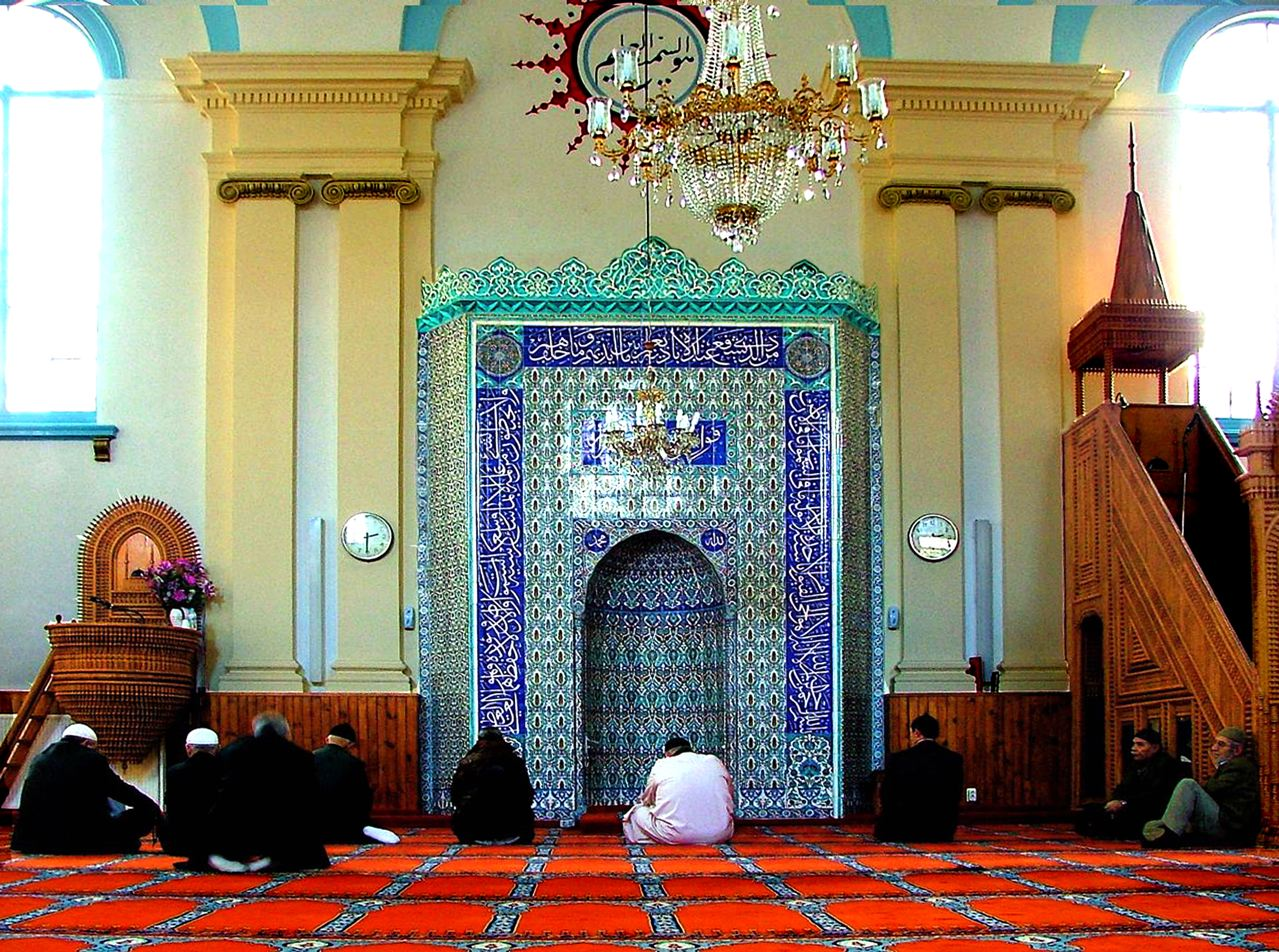
Islamic prayer, facing the mihrab

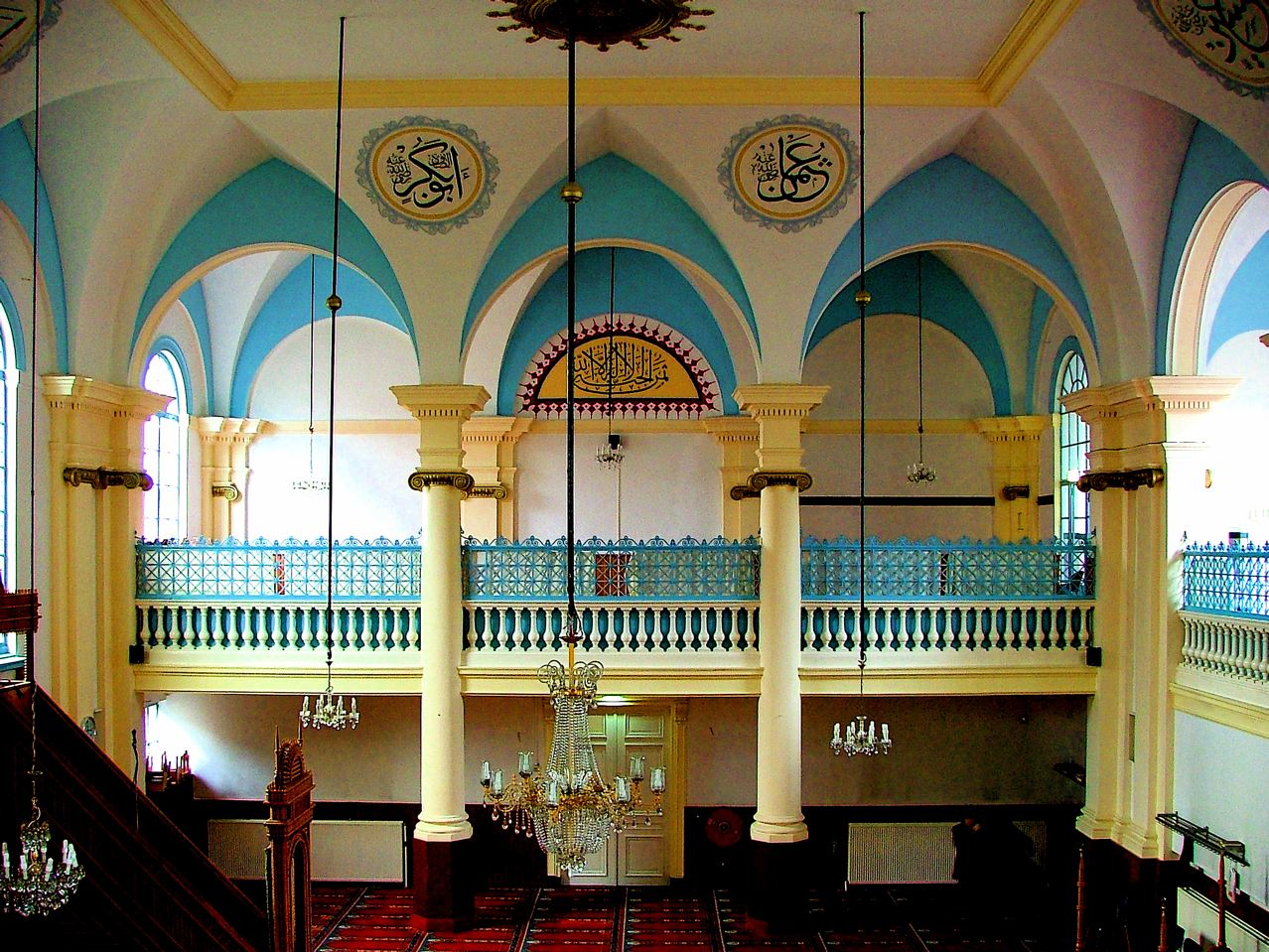
Interior view

== See also ==
- Islam in the Netherlands
- List of mosques in the Netherlands
