= Mubarak Mosque, The Hague =

Mosque in The Hague, the Netherlands

Mubarak Mosque
- Mobarakmoskee مسجد مبارک
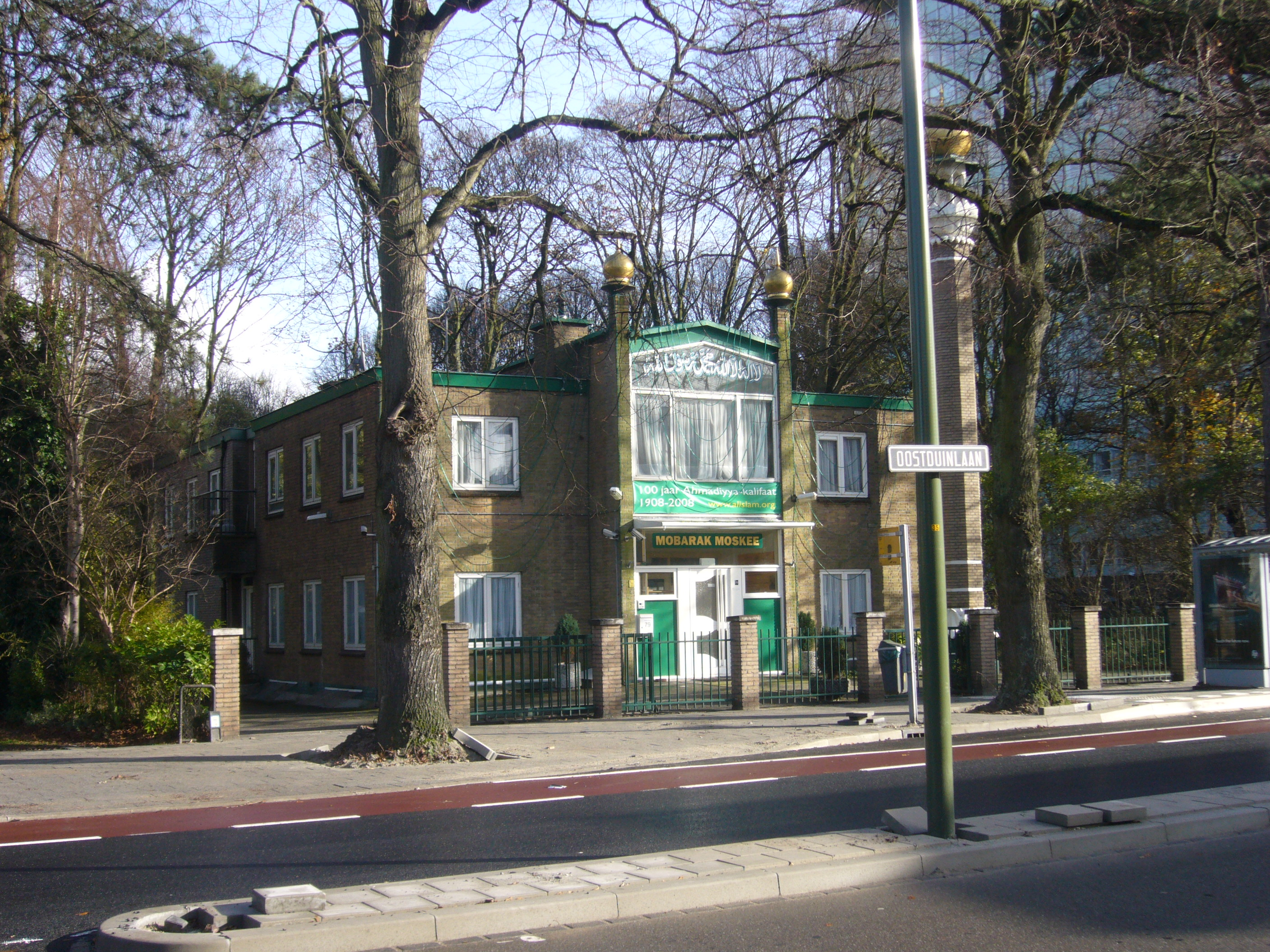

Religion
- Affiliation: Islam
- Branch/tradition: Ahmadiyya

Location
- Location: The Hague, The Netherlands
- Interactive map of Mubarak Mosque
- Coordinates: 52°05′42.7″N 4°18′46.5″E

Architecture
- Architect: Frits Beck
- Type: Mosque
- Completed: 1955

Specifications
- Capacity: 500
- Minaret: 3

The Mubarak Mosque (Dutch: Mobarakmoskee) in The Hague is the first purpose-built mosque in the Netherlands. Its foundation stone was laid by Sir Muhammad Zafarullah Khan on 20 May 1955 who later inaugurated the mosque on 9 December 1955.

== History ==
The Ahmadiyya Muslim Community came to the Netherlands in 1947 and Qudrat-Ullah Hafiz was the first missionary.

== Architecture ==
The mosque was designed by Frits Beck. In July 1963, two small gold-plated minaret-turrets rising 2 metres above the building were built after approval was granted in February 1963.

=== Vandalism ===
On the morning of 8 August 1987, the mosque was almost burnt down by someone who presented themselves as a "Sunni Muslim". The individual claimed that the mosque did not preach "true Islam" and that he felt that "something had to be done". After the fire, the mosque had dilapidated appearance and was in need of renovation.

=== Renovation ===
The community leaders approached an Ahmadi architect, Abdul Rashid from London, as he had been designing mosques for many Ahmadiyya missions around the world without charge. The municipality gave a permit on 22 February 1995 and construction began by a group of volunteers on 29 May 1996 when the foundation stone for renovation and enlargement was laid by the fourth caliph of the community, Mirza Tahir Ahmad. The extension officially opened on 30 October 1998.

Construction of the minaret started early 2005 and was officially opened on 9 December 2005.

On 3 June 2006 Queen Beatrix of the Netherlands had visited the Mobarak Mosque to commemorate the building's 50th anniversary.

== See also ==
- Ahmadiyya
- Islam in the Netherlands
- List of mosques in the Netherlands
- List of first mosques by country
