= El Tawheed Mosque =

Mosque in Amsterdam, North Holland, Netherlands

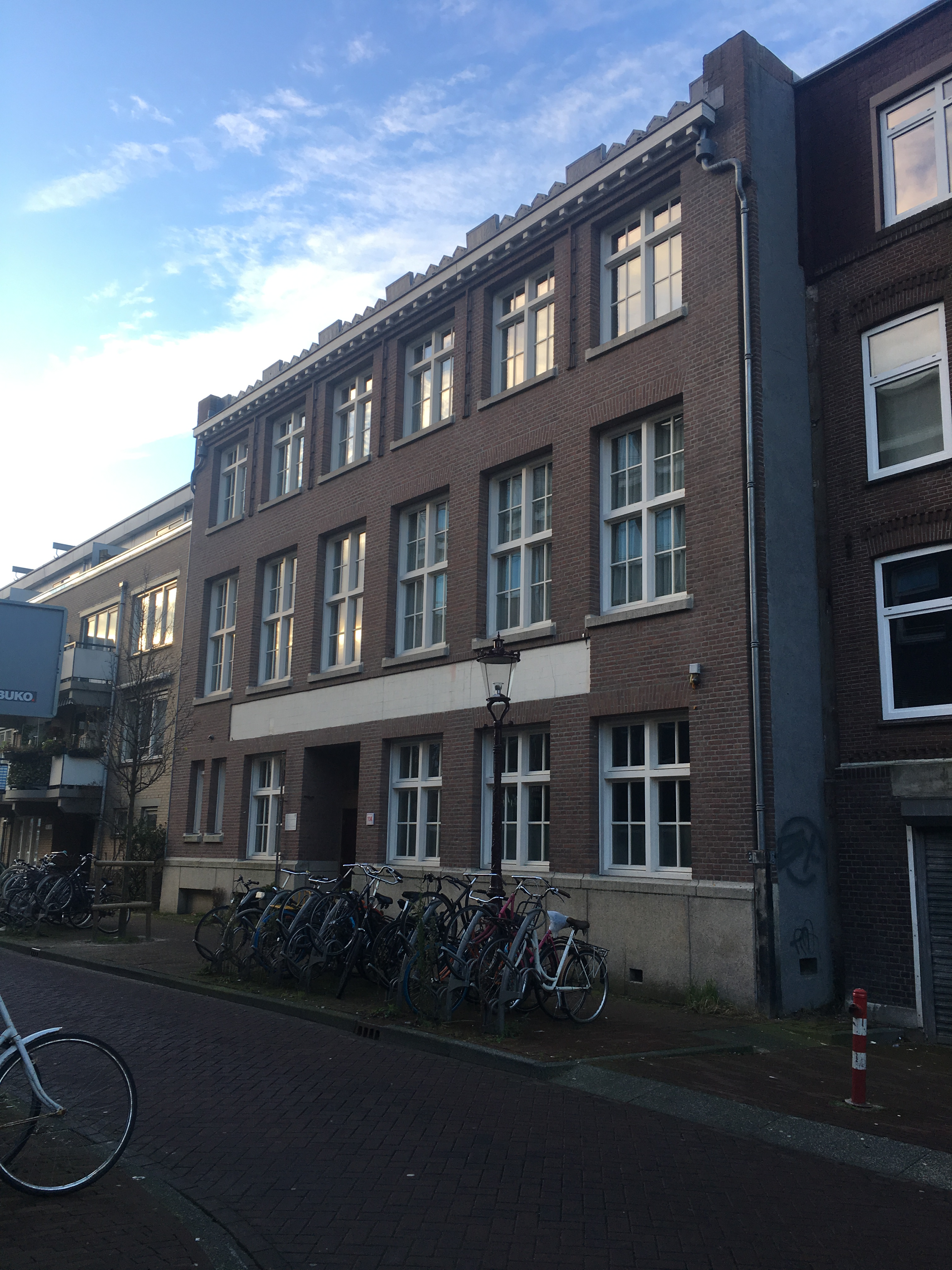

- Location within Amsterdam

Location
- Location: Amsterdam, North Holland, Netherlands
- Interactive map of El Tawheed Mosque
- Coordinates: 52°22′3″N 4°51′50″E

Architecture
- Type: mosque
- Established: 1986

The El Tawheed Mosque is a Sunni mosque in Amsterdam, Netherlands.

The mosque is on Jan Hanzenstraat in the Old-West section of Amsterdam. Aside from its normal function, the mosque is used for social work, and for lessons in the Arabic language. It also houses a book store and a publisher of religious videos and DVDs.

The mosque was in-part funded by the Saudi non-governmental organization al-Haramain Foundation.

== History ==
The mosque was established in 1986.

== Islamism association ==
The mosque at one time had been cited by the Dutch government as a potential propagator of extremism. Mohammed Bouyeri the killer of Dutch film director Theo van Gogh attended the mosque.

== See also ==
- List of mosques in the Netherlands
- Tawhid
