= Comana Pontica =

Ancient city of Pontus

Coordinates: 40°21′27″N 36°38′19″E

- Κόμανα Ποντική (Ancient Greek)
- Komana Pontika
- Location within West and Central Asia
- Interactive map of Comana Pontica
- Type: Settlement
- Associated with: Ottoman Empire, Byzantine Greeks, Roman Empire, Greeks
- Location: Tokat, Black Sea Region, Turkey
- Region: Pontus, ancient Pontus, Anatolia

History
- Built: c. 281 BC

Site notes
- Discovered: 2009

Comana Pontica (Ancient Greek: Κόμανα Ποντική, romanized: Komana Pontika), was an ancient city located in ancient Pontus, on the river Iris, at modern Gümenek near Tokat in Turkey.

== History ==
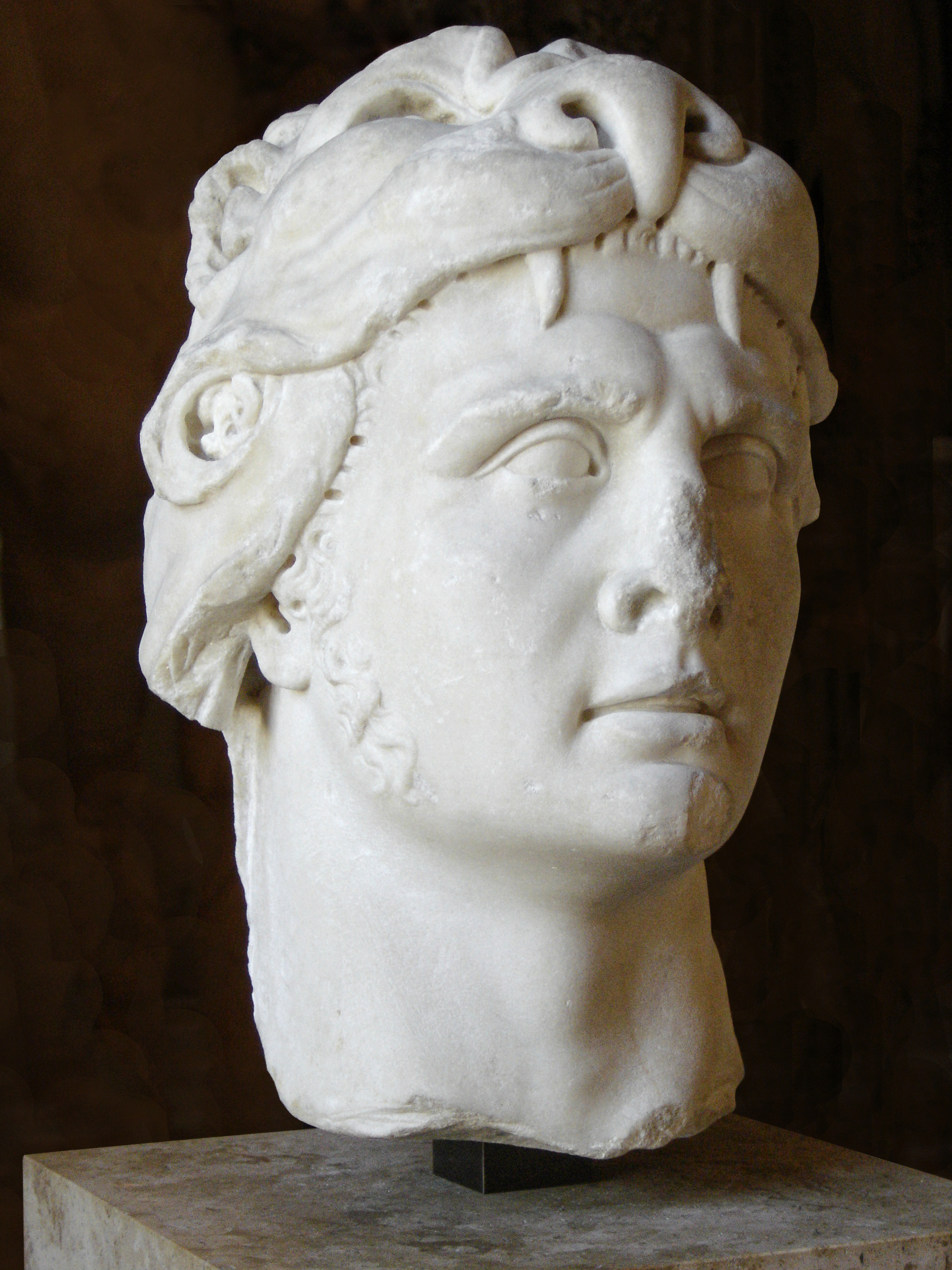
Bust of Mithridates VI from the Louvre

Comana Pontica was located in the region of Pontus (now part of modern Turkey). It was located in 2009 by the use of ground-sensor radar and excavation on the outer walls soon began. The Middle East Technical University (METU) located in Ankara, Turkey, undertook control of the diggings. Translate page KARP - Komana Arkeolojik Araştırma Projesi. Of four locations chosen, three proved to be sites of city settlements. As each layer was removed, beginning with the outer city walls, artifacts as well as skeletal remains revealed the presence of the Ottoman Empire, the Byzantine Greeks, the Roman Empire, and the Greeks. With each subsequent layer, it is hoped that proof of the Assyrians, the Hittites, the Lydians, and the Cimmerians presence will be authenticated. In this ancient city, there were regular festivals during which women residing at Komana during the Hittite period performed sacred prostitution.

The Pontic region was self-governing as the Kingdom of Pontus from 281 BCE with the ascension of Mithridates I of Pontus (Persian Mithridatic dynasty) until 63 BCE when Mithridates VI of Pontus was defeated at the Battle of the Lycus by Roman General Pompey. Mithridates VI committed suicide by poison rather than be captured and brought to Rome in a cage. The territory of the Kingdom of Mithridates VI of Pontus, Comana Pontica was a large temple-state operating in the Hellenistic period which covers ancient Greek (Hellenic) history and Mediterranean history between the death of Alexander the Great in 323 BC and the emergence of the Roman Empire as signified by the Battle of Actium in 31 BC and the subsequent conquest of the ancient Egyptian Ptolemaic Kingdom the following year. Tokat (pop. 129,879 2009 census), the capital city of Tokat province borders what once was Comana Pontica. The Hittite temple in Comana Pontica was dedicated to the goddess Ma. It was visited by the geographer Strabo and Julius Caesar. Large tracts of land around Mabed (site of the temple) was ceded to the temple by the King of Pontus. The land was cultivated and the temple claimed all profits for its maintenance. The temple was tended by 6,000 serfs (vassals/servants/slaves), many of whom were Persian (Strabo 12.3.34).

Governing Comana Pontica was by the Chief Priest who was second in line behind the King of Pontus. Mithridates VI claimed to be a direct descendant of Alexander the Great and had fought against the Roman Generals: Sulla, Lucullus, and Pompey. According to Strabo (12.3.32), the Comana Pontica temple was a replica of the temple in Cappadocia and the methods of celebration were the same. The territory of Comana expanded under the rule of the Pontic Kings and throughout the Roman Empire periods. Pompey in Rome added 2 schoeni or 60 stades (11,100 meters) to the temple land. As a result, the area of the city reached a diameter of about 4 km (Magie 1950, 371, Wilson 1960, 229). Caesar or Antony, from the Roman emperors, gave four more schoeni (22,200 meters) worthy soil to the Comana Temple Priests (Wilson 1960, 229). These new lands are likely to have been added to the eastern, southern and western sides of the city. These areas are known as Zelitis and Megalopolitis. On the north side, it can be assumed that the cities of Magnopolis and Neocaesareia are very near, so that they are limited. It is known that during Augustus the area of the city had expanded to reach the size of civitates (City-State) in the region. Komana M.S. When Pontus was added to Galaticus territory in 34–35, Magnopolitic city was most likely included in Komana Pontika (IGR III, 105; Waddington et al. 1904, 109).

The city was known both as Hierocaesareia and Komana until the time of Titus (39–81 CE) (IGR III, 105,106). The collapse of the temple accelerated the spread of Christianity. The name was Romanized from Komana Pontika to Comana Pontica. The surrounding lands were included in a much smaller but central settlement, Daximon. The martyr Basiliscus of Comana, who was executed around 310 AD, was bishop of Comana. Saint John Chrysostom died in Comana in 407 AD in the Presbyterium or community of the clergy belonging to the church of Saint Basiliscus.

Ma, the main goddess of the temple state, has been on the coin since the time of the official emperor Caligula. The only available data for the architectural image of the temple is Caracalla, Septimius Severus, and later Trajan cocci (Fig. A tetrastil temple is depicted on these coins. It is thought that 8 gray columns used in the construction of Ali Pasha's Mosque in Tokat province center may belong to the temple. It is also possible that the columns and column headings used in the Ulu Mosque in Utrecht, Netherlands were also brought from the ancient city of Komana.

Strabo locates Comana on the river Iris upstream from Dazimonitis (Kazova), the plain named after the city of Dazimon (Ottoman Dazmana, present-day Akçatarla, 8 km NE of Turhal). Anthony Bryer and David Winfield suggested that Comana, which disappears from the historical record in Byzantine times, must have moved either to the adjacent site of Tokat, which offered better protection against Persian and Arab raids, or to Dazimon, which they identify with some Hellenistic tombs in the vicinity and consider the Hellenistic forerunner to Roman Comana. However, Dazimon and Comana lie on the opposite ends of the Kazova plain (the site of the Battle of Anzen in 838). As Paul Wittek points out, Dazimon and Tokat are both mentioned in the 13th century by Ibn Bibi and Komana is recorded separately in 1347 as Komada (Κόμαδα). The name Komada corresponds to the historical Turkish form Qōmanāt (compare the derivation of Tokat from Dokeia, late antique Eudocia), which is attested in the 14th-century works of Hamdallah Mustawfi and ʿAzīz b. Ārdaşir Āstarābādī, and in publications as late as 1919/20. From this comes the present name Gümenek.

== Geography ==
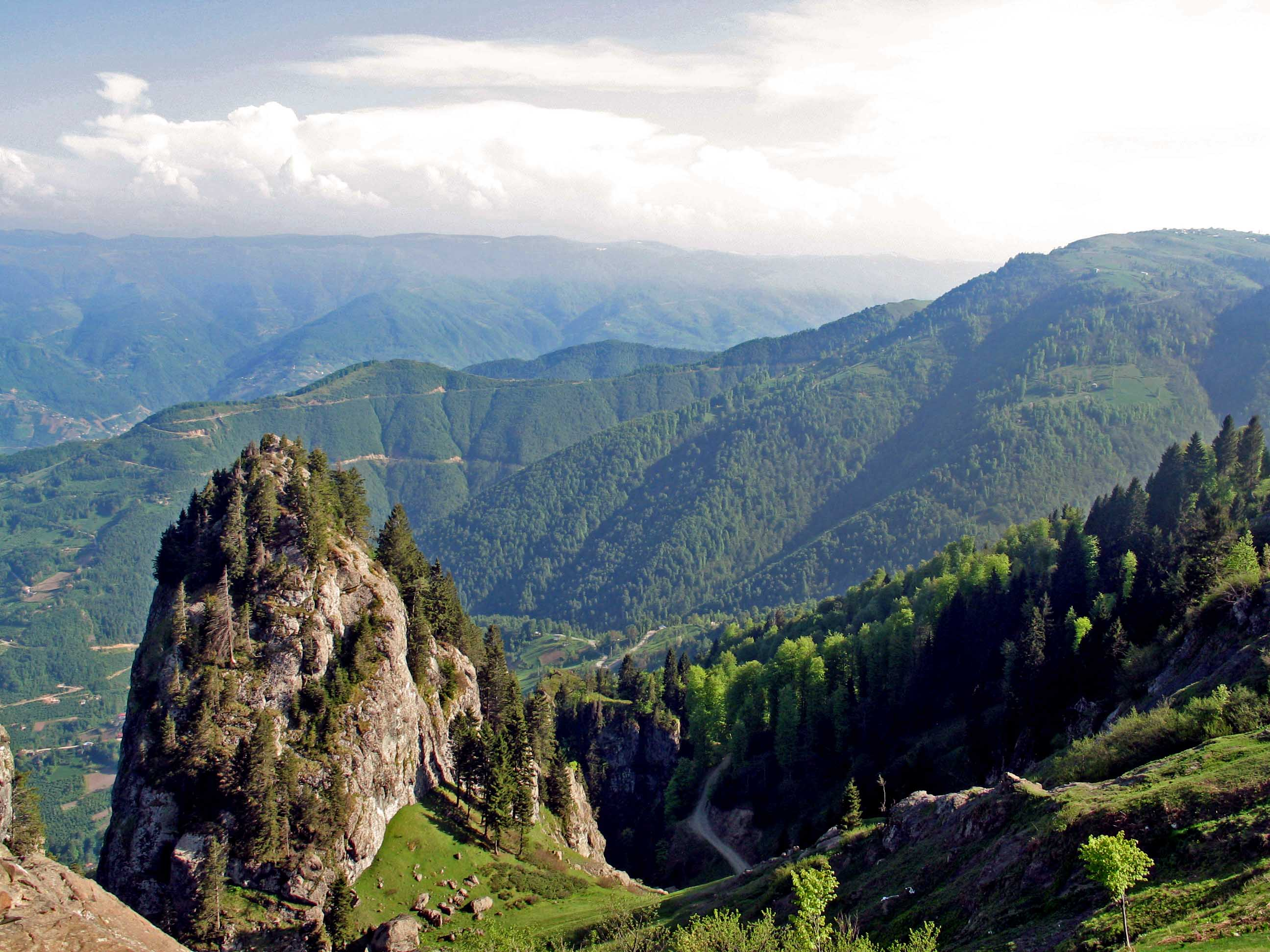
The Pontic Alps which divided the kingdom

Komana is located on a natural hill just south of the Gümenek village, on the west bank of the Yeşilırmak (ancient Iris), 9 km northeast of Tokat on the road towards Niksar (ancient Neokaisareia) (Proc.Pers.i.17.14). It is predicted from the remains of the wall on the hill where this large hill dominates the productive ovine in the region of the city. It is thought that the walls of these small and formless stones may have brought the inner filling of the foundation of the temple wall of the temple to the square. It was thought that the temple was connected to the other side of the River Yeşilırmak River by a lost bridge today and it was found during the researches of 2004 in the water regulator of the bridge. The fertile lands around the hill must have played an important role in the economic structure of the temple state (Strabo 12.3.34). Unfortunately, the site was damaged by modern irrigation channels and a newly constructed highway.

== The Anderson Expedition (1896–99) ==
During the latter half of July 1899, J. G. C. Anderson, Fellow of Christ Church, Oxford University, England, explored the central and eastern district of Asia Minor, travelling through Pontus. Detail typographical maps were constructed using ancient Persian and Roman maps that took them along roadways that followed valleys through the Pontus Mountains, constructed initially by Persian King Darius I (c. 549–486) BCE), and maintained by the Romans until the emergence of the Kingdom of Pontus. After the death of Mithridates VI, the region came under Roman and Byzantine control. With the defeat of the Byzantines and the fall of Constantinople, the Empire of Trebizond was formed under the Komnenos dynasty until the Ottoman Empire seized it. After the Romans relinquished control of the area, road maintenance was nearly non-existent. In 1899, Anderson travelled in an oxcart throughout the Pontic region where most original road still existed. He located and noted possibly sighting of castles, bridges and temples. His fellow traveler, J. A. R. Munro together with D. G. Hogarth published a book entitled, Modern and Ancient Roads in eastern Asia Minor that included a chapter on Roads in Pontus, Royal and Roman. Their maps proved that the original roads were still in use after two thousand years with some variances due to erosion. They came upon an Armenian monetary in Bizeri, Tokat, Turkey approximately 15 miles from Comana Pontica. Stones identified as being from a dark marble quarry in Comana were found in abundance. At Comana, a mound was found near a bridge that crossed the Iris. An inscription identifies Comana as the site.

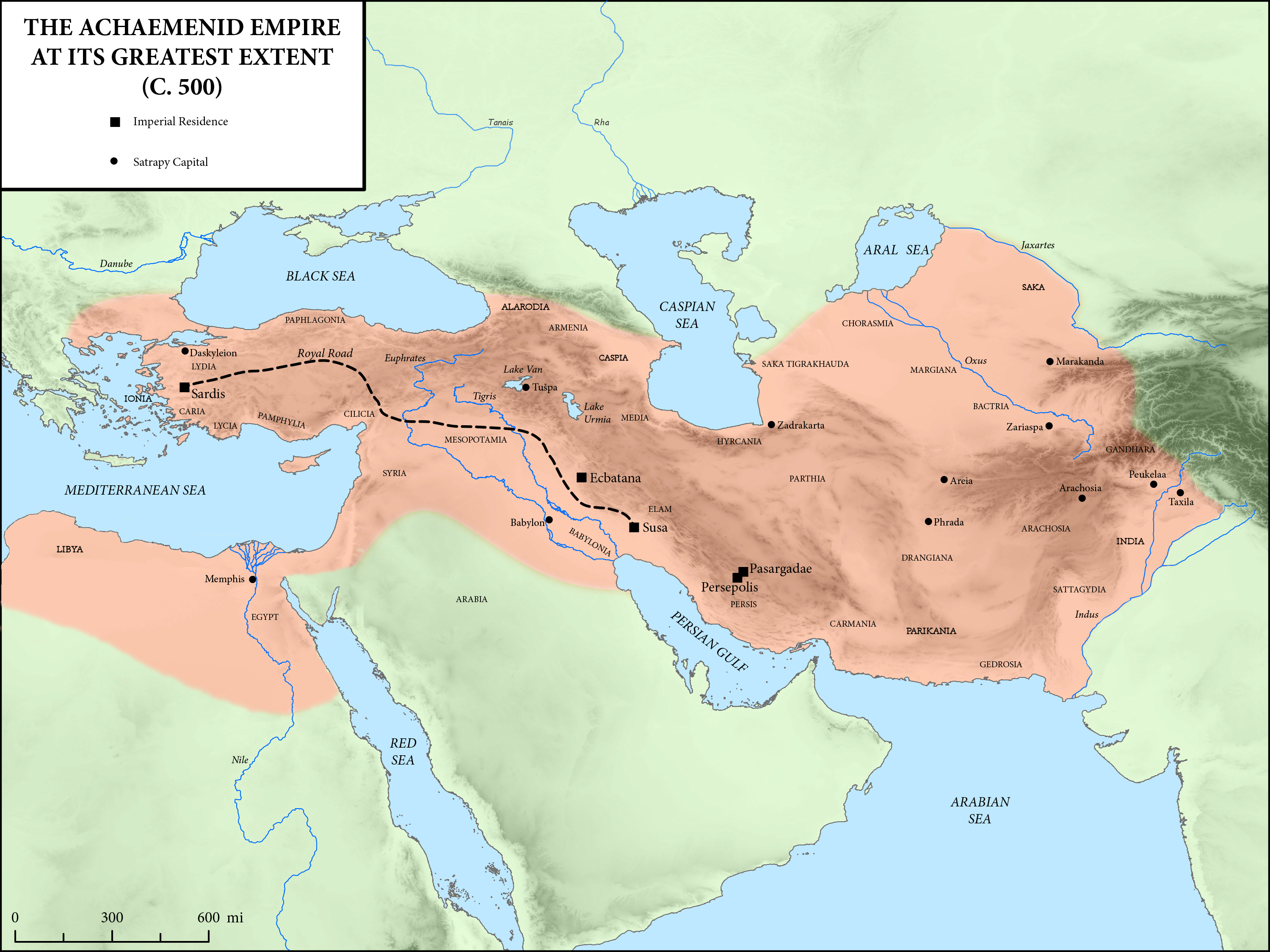
The map of Achaemenid Empire and the section of the Royal Road noted by Herodotus

== See also ==
- Ethnarchy of Comana
