= Jamia Taibah Mosque Amsterdam =

Mosque in Amsterdam, the Netherlands

Taibah Jama Masjid Mosque Amsterdam, Netherland
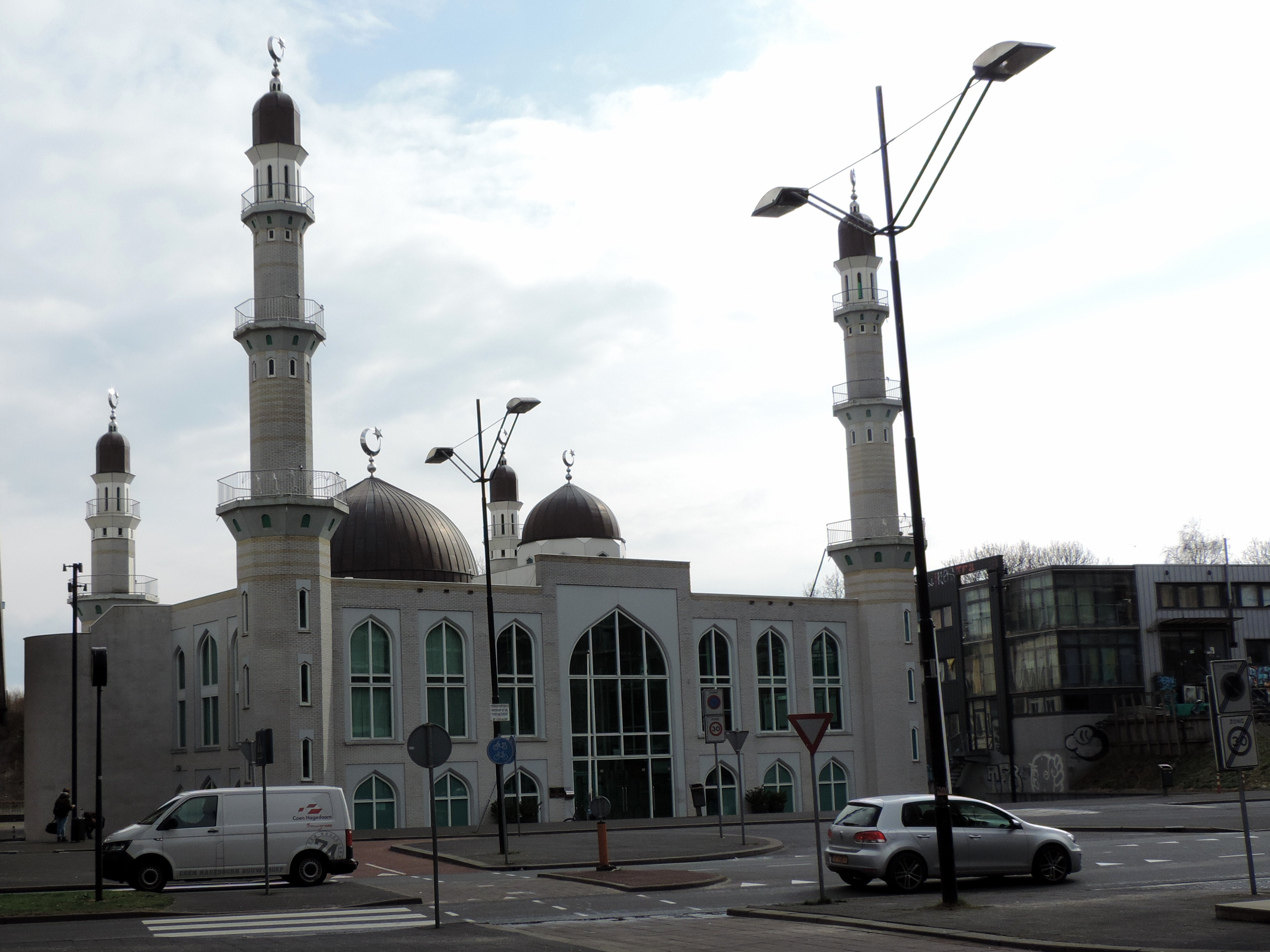

Religion
- Affiliation: Sunni Islam Barelvi
- Leadership: Hazrat Allama Mufti Shafiq-ur-Rehman Mishabi Noorani

Location
- Location: Amsterdam Zuidoost (Southeast), Netherlands
- Interactive map of Taibah Jama Masjid Mosque Amsterdam, Netherland
- Coordinates: 52°18′56.52″N 4°58′47.28″E

Architecture
- Founder: World Islamic Mission
- Groundbreaking: January 19th, 1985
- Completed: 2000

Specifications
- Capacity: 2,000 (including women and Children)
- Dome: 2
- Minaret: 4

Website
- www.masjidtaibah.nl/duurzaam-en/

The Taibah Mosque is a (Indo-Surinamese) mosque in Amsterdam, the Netherlands. It is affiliated with World Islamic Mission and subscribe to Sunni Barelvi ideology of Islam. It has Jamia Madinatul Islam as center of Islamic learning. In state of Noord-Holland, it is located on Karspeldreef south of Kraaiennest metro station. There is a name which also mentioned in this mosque that is H.E Shah Ahmad Noorani Siddiqi, a prominent figure and leader of World Islamic Mission who help spread Islamic teachings in several parts of Europe and in south Asia. mission.

The mosque was founded by Surinam born Muhammad Yunus Gaffar (1940-2020) and designed by architect Paul Haffmans. The mosque is mainly attended by people of Surinamese, Indian and Pakistani descent.

The building is adorned with round domes and high minarets. The building is a combination of foreign Islamic features and modern materials and forms. The mosque was designed by the Dutch architect Paul Haffmans and was completed in 1985. Many visitors and residents are proud to call the building and therefore 'the pearl of the Bijlmer‟. Haffmanns combined a traditional mosque building (with minarets, dome and mihrab) with modern building materials. Hazrat Allama Mufti Shafiq-ur-Rehman Mishabi Noorani, a Barelvi graduate from Jamia Ashrafia, Mubarakpur is prayer leader (Imam) of the mosque.

== See also ==
- World Islamic Mission
