= Al-Fourqaan mosque =

Mosque in Eindhoven, North Brabant, Netherlands

Al-Fourqaan Mosque
- Al-Fourqaanmoskee

Location
- Location: Eindhoven, Netherlands
- Interactive map of Al-Fourqaan Mosque
- Coordinates: 51.453429°N 5.469222°E

Architecture
- Type: Mosque
- Established: 1990s

The Al-Fourqaan mosque is a Salafi Islamic mosque in which is part of Al-fourqaan Islamic Center in Eindhoven, Netherlands, established in the 1990s.

== Notable events ==
The mosque was established by the Moroccan community.

From late 2001 or early 2002, the mosque was under observation by AIVD, the Dutch intelligence service, after links were reported with the perpetrators of the September 11 attacks, including Mohammed Atta.

According to Lorenzo Vidino and Erick Stakelbeck of The Investigative Project on Terrorism, writing in 2003, the mosque had held seminars on Islamic law organized by the Saudi-based al-Waqf al-Islami Foundation. The mosque, under the leadership of Sudanese imam, Eisha Bersham, became the centre of the foundation's activities.

The mosque was attended by two Dutch Moroccan youths killed in Kashmir in an alleged suicide attack on Indian troops. They were Ahmed El Bakiouli and Khalid El Hassnoui or el-Hasnoui, who according to an opinion piece on the de Volkskrant blog were reportedly recruited by Algerian terrorist group Groupe Salafiste pour la Prédication et le Combat and killed in Kashmir fighting a separatist war against India.

In 2003, a school connected to it, the Tarieq Ibnu Zyad Islamic primary school, was attacked, and then in 2004 bombed as part of a wave of attacks on Dutch mosques in the wake of the murder of film-maker Theo van Gogh.

The mosque received media attention since 2005 for its jihadist imam Eisha Bersham from Bosnia. AIVD classified him as a threat to national security, and minister for integration and immigration Rita Verdonk responded by banning him from the country as an 'unwanted foreigner' one of three imams at the mosque so designated. Initially, an Amsterdam court ruled that the imam could stay, but on 27 April 2007 the Council of State finally ruled Bersham would be banned from the Netherlands for the next ten years.

In 2015, seven imams due to speak at a conference the mosque was hosting were banned by Eindhoven mayor Rob van Gijzel after consulting the counter terrorism watchdog NCTV.

In 2019, the anti-Islam organisation Pegida demonstrated outside the mosque during Ramadan, leading to violence and the arrest of ten counter-protestors including three under-age teenagers, of whom two were released for lack of evidence and one charged with insulting the police. Pegida vowed to return repeatedly. A year later eleven men were sentenced to several hours of community service, and two were acquitted.
