= Rusthof cemetery =

Cemetery in Oud-Leusden, Netherlands

Coordinates: 52.1295°N 5.3757°E

Rusthof cemetery (Dutch: begraafplaats Rusthof) (Note: "Rusthof" means "place of rest".) is located at the Dodeweg 31 in Leusden, the Netherlands. It is the largest cemetery that services the nearby town of Amersfoort.

== People ==
It is a partly civilian, partly military cemetery. In the military sections are the graves of World War II victims, including 238 soldiers and pilots killed in action from the British Commonwealth, Poland, Belgium and France, also World War II military victims from Yugoslavia, Greece, Hungary, Romania, Portugal, Czechoslovakia and Italy (World War I and II), as well as 865 soldiers from the Soviet Union. A number of Soviet victims came from the nearby Kamp Amersfoort, including 101 Central Asian prisoners. Most of them were Uzbeks or citizens of Samarqand, and were executed in woods near the camp, in April 1942. The Soviet soldiers were eventually reburied in 1947/1948 in what is called "the Russian Honor Field" or "the Soviet Field of Glory".

Joan Röell (1844–1914), who served as Prime Minister of the Netherlands from 1894 to 1897, is buried there.

== See also ==
- Battle of Smolensk (1941)
- Operation Barbarossa
- German mistreatment of Soviet prisoners of war
