= Mevlana Mosque, Rotterdam =

Mosque in Rotterdam, South Holland, Netherlands

Mevlana Mosque
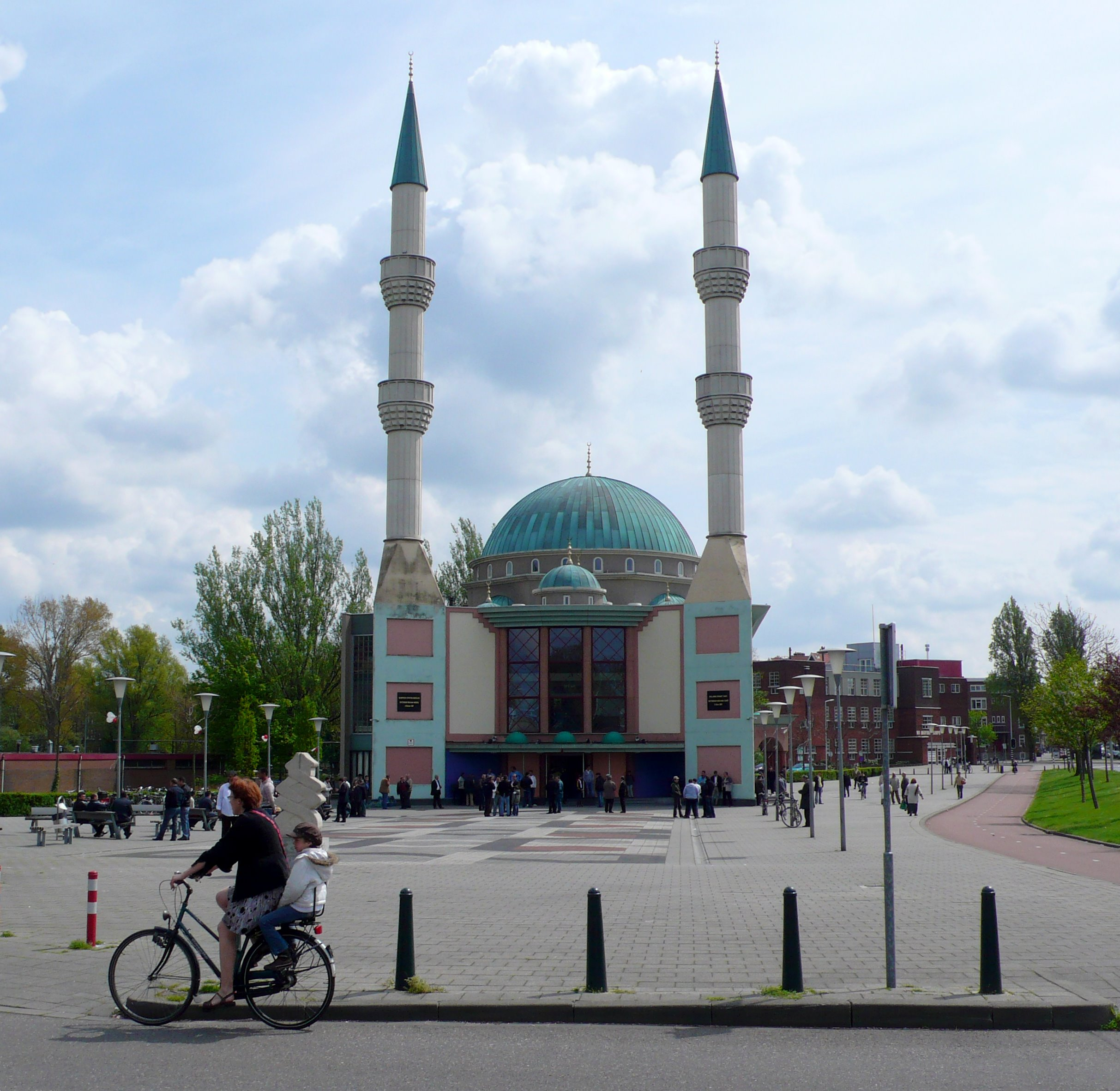

Religion
- Affiliation: Sunni Islam

Location
- Location: Rotterdam, Netherlands
- Interactive map of Mevlana Mosque
- Coordinates: 51.9212°N 4.4416°E

Architecture
- Type: Mosque
- Style: Moorish Revival architecture/Vernacular architecture
- Completed: 2001

Specifications
- Minaret: 2
- Minaret height: 33,8m

The Mevlana Mosque (Dutch: Mevlanamoskee; Turkish: Mevlana Camii) is a mosque in northwestern Rotterdam, Netherlands which serves mainly Turkish-Dutch Muslims. The mosque, named after Rumi, was built in 2001 and has two minarets. The mosque was voted as Rotterdam's most attractive building in 2006.

== See also ==
- List of mosques in the Netherlands

== Bibliography ==
- Knippenberg, Hans (2005), The changing religious landscape of Europe, Het Spinhuis, ISBN 90-5589-248-3.
- Ulzen, Patricia van (2007), Imagine a Metropolis: Rotterdam's Creative Class, 1970-2000, 010 Publishers, ISBN 978-90-6450-621-5.
