= Ulu Mosque (Utrecht) =

Mosques in Utrecht, the Netherlands

Ulu Cami (tr.: "Grand Mosque")
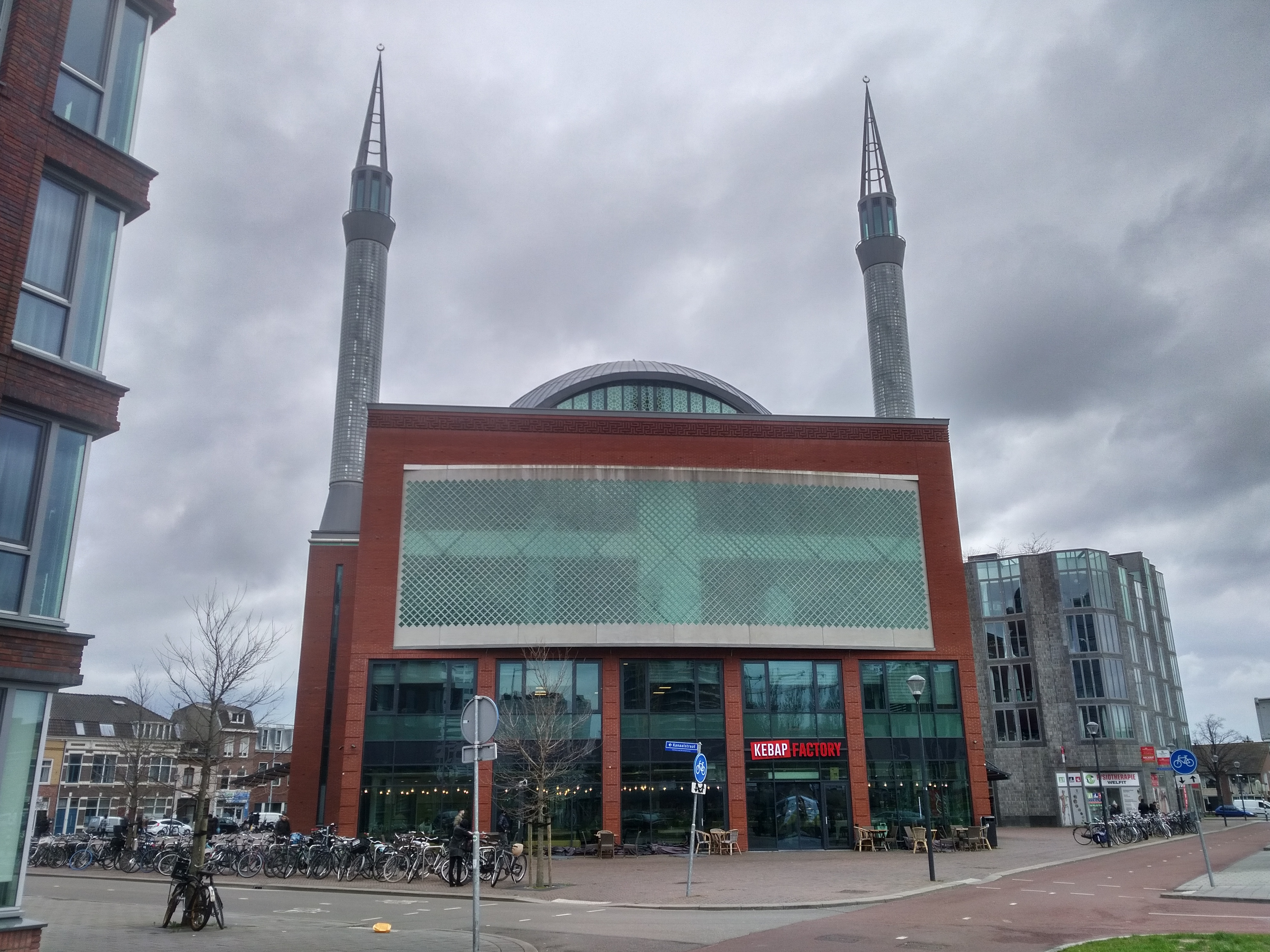

Religion
- Affiliation: Islam

Location
- Location: Utrecht, Netherlands
- Interactive map of Ulu Cami (tr.: "Grand Mosque")
- Coordinates: 52°5′31.05″N 5°6′15.05″E

Architecture
- Architect: Ishak Önen
- Style: Postmodern architecture
- Completed: 2015
- Construction cost: 11.5 Million Euro

Specifications
- Capacity: 1200
- Dome height (outer): 44 m
- Minaret: 2
- Materials: brick, glass, steel

The Ulu Mosque in Utrecht is located at the Mosque square; the first square or street in the Netherlands named after an Islamic religious building. Besides the Islamic prayer hall, the building also host a room for contemplation for people from any other denomination. The board of the mosque decided to create such a room, unique in the world, since the neighborhood surrounding the mosque has also a substantial Christian and Jewish population. There are some shops at ground floor level. The mosque is maintained by the Islamitische Stichting Nederland (a branch of the Sunni-Turkish directorate Diyanet). Funding is however based on donations from the Turkish communities in the Netherlands, Belgium and Germany. The main prayer room is at the second floor, and has two large balconies for women. The glass brick minarets are lighted with light after sunset. The mosque was formally opened in October 2015.
