= 2019 Utrecht tram shooting =

Mass shooting in Utrecht, Netherlands

Utrecht tram shooting
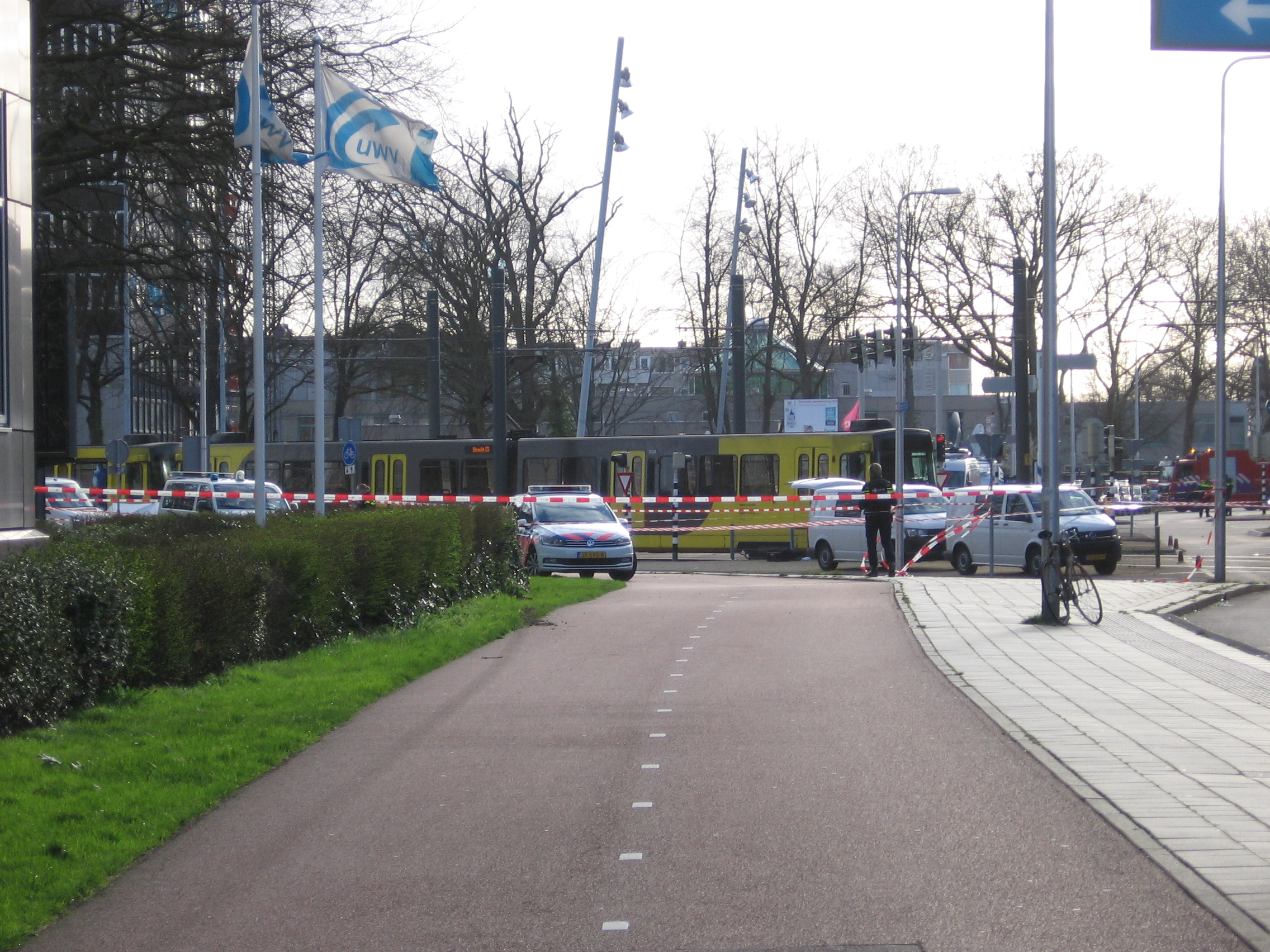
- The tram after the attack

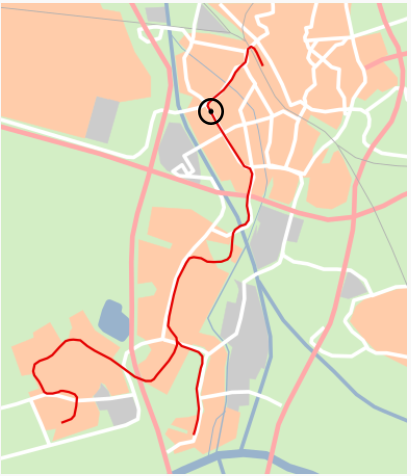
- Location of the shooting
- Location: 52.0807°N 5.0914°E; 24 Oktoberplein, Utrecht, Netherlands
- Date: 18 March 2019; 10:41 (CET)
- Target: Civilians
- Attack type: Mass shooting, Islamic terrorism, mass murder
- Weapon: Pistol with silencer
- Deaths: 4
- Injuries: 6
- Perpetrator: Gökmen Tanis
- Motive: Islamic extremism, possible retaliation to Christchurch mosque shootings
- Verdict: Life imprisonment
- Convicted: Murder with terrorist intent (4 counts); Attempted murder with terrorist intent (3 counts); Terrorism (17 counts)

On the morning of 18 March 2019, four people were killed and six others were injured in a mass shooting on a tram in Utrecht, Netherlands. One of the injured died of his injuries ten days later. Gökmen Tanis, a 37-year-old Turkish Dutch citizen (before being stripped of citizenship in 2022), originally from Turkey, was arrested later that day following a major security operation and manhunt. He was later convicted of murder with terrorist intent and sentenced to life in prison. The shooting was considered an act of Islamic extremism.

== Attack ==
The shooting took place on a light railway near the 24 Oktoberplein junction. On the day of the shooting, Gökmen Tanis walked from his mother's house to the tram station. He carried a pistol equipped with a silencer underneath his jacket and several rounds of loose ammunition. Tanis stood at the station's platform until a tram arrived. At 10:41:00 CET (09:41:00 UTC), Tanis entered the rear car of the tram. As the tram departed from the station, 17 passengers, including Tanis, were inside the rear car of the tram.

In the tram, Tanis pulled out his pistol and walked to the front of the car. At the front of the car, Tanis aimed his pistol at the back of a man's head. He pulled the trigger but the gun malfunctioned. Tanis walked back towards the rear of the car. At the halfway point of the car, Tanis drew his pistol and tried to fire at a woman twice. The gun malfunctioned in both attempts. At 10:41:35, Tanis took a step forward and aimed his pistol at a different woman sitting opposite to the woman he had just tried to kill. This time, he fired his first shot into the woman's chest, killing her. Tanis aimed his pistol back at the woman he previously failed to shoot. She was now holding up a bag to protect herself. Tanis shot her in the torso, wounding her.

At this point, the passengers in the tram car began to panic and ran to both the front end and back end of the car. After shooting the women, Tanis aimed his pistol at another person who quickly ducked out of the way. Tanis walked to the front end of the car. At the front end of the car, four passengers, including 49-year-old Rinke Terpstra, were trying to open the doors. Tanis aimed his pistol at Terpsta and fired twice at him. Terpsta quickly raised his bag to protect himself, blocking both bullets. Terpsta pulled the tram's emergency brakes, causing the vehicle to stop. Tanis turned around and fired twice at a man who was still sitting in his seat, killing him. After killing the man, Tanis walked to the rear end of the tram car. As he walked to the rear of the car, Tanis fired another shot into the woman he had previously killed, causing her body to fall out of her seat.

At the rear end of the tram car, a passenger managed to break open one of the doors. Eight of the passengers jumped out of the broken doors. One of the passengers injured herself as she fell out of the tram, causing her to struggle to stand up just outside the tram. A couple and their baby were the last people to escape through the doors. They left their stroller wedged between the set of doors, blocking it. Tanis walked up to the doors and fired a shot into the back of the woman who was struggling to stand up, leaving her further injured. After shooting the woman, Tanis removed the magazine from his pistol to inspect it. Tanis then walked back to the front end of the tram car while loading cartridges to his magazine.

At the front end of the tram car, a passenger managed to kick out a window of one set of doors. Tanis slid the magazine back in his pistol and approached the passengers. Six of the passengers jumped out of the broken door window in a line, with Terpsta being the last person to jump. Just after Terpsta was able to jump out of the tram, Tanis walked up to the door with the broken window and fatally shot Terpsta. After killing Terpsta, Tanis sat down on a seat to load more cartridges into his magazine. He sat near the dead body of one of his victims. After inserting his loaded magazine back into his pistol, Tanis approached the broken door window and stepped out of the tram at 10:43:09.

Outside of the tram, a crowd of people were trying to carry one of the injured women to the cars stopped at a traffic light in Beneluxlaan. Tanis approached the group and fired at them, hitting no one. The group left the injured woman on the street. Tanis approached a person who was hiding behind a car. He aimed the pistol at them but decided to spare them. Tanis continued walking towards the cars at the traffic light and fired a single shot, hitting a person's car. Tanis stopped in front of two different cars. He pointed his weapon at the drivers of both of the cars before deciding to shoot the driver to his right twice. The driver was mortally wounded and would die of his injuries days later. After shooting the driver, Tanis entered an abandoned Renault Clio and drove towards Pijperlaan. He swerved around the tram and briefly slowed down past a bus stop in Pijperlaan. As he slowed down, he fired several shots at the people outside, hitting no one, before driving away.

=== Arrest ===
The shooter fled in a car, leading to a large scale police manhunt, which lasted for much of the day. Several hours later, the police arrested Gökmen Tanis, a 37-year-old man born in Turkey. In addition, two further arrests were made in connection to the shooting. Police impounded a red Renault Clio in connection with the attack.

Initially, it was reported that one of the women shot may have been the target due to "family reasons" and other passengers coming to her aid were then also targeted. However, law enforcement later announced there was no evidence of any connection between Tanis and the victims. Instead, a note found in the getaway car hinted at terrorism being the motive. Throughout the attack, Tanis also shouted "Allahu Akbar" several times.

== Victims ==
Three people were killed immediately and seven others were injured, three severely. The injured were taken to the University Medical Center Utrecht. The three people killed were identified as two men from Utrecht aged 49 and 28, and a 19-year-old woman from the nearby city of Vianen. A neighbour of the murdered 19-year-old started a crowd-funding action to cover the costs of her funeral, reaching the target within hours. It received so many donations that it was turned into a fund for all of the victims of the attack. The 49-year-old victim, Rinke Terpstra, broke a window in the tram which allowed at least five people to escape. Terpstra was posthumously awarded the Erepenning voor Menslievend Hulpbetoon for his actions.

A 74-year-old man injured in the shooting died of his injuries on 28 March, bringing the death toll to four.

== Perpetrator ==
Gökmen Tanis from Utrecht was arrested after a manhunt on the day of the attack.

Tanis was born on 2 July 1981 in Yozgat Province, Turkey, and came to the Netherlands in 1993 with his parents and two brothers, due to political instability. His parents divorced in 2008 and since then he had lost contact with his father. Until 2017, he lived mainly with his mother. In the Utrecht neighborhood Kanaleneiland, Tanis is known for his hair color as 'De Rode Turk' or 'Lokman'.

As of 2011, Tanis has been intermittently addicted to hard drugs. According to his family and local residents, he was very aggressive when he used drugs, and, apart from his interactions with other drug users, he was almost always seen alone. In the periods between his addictions he focused more on his Sunni faith. At the time of his arrest, Tanis was about to be evicted due to rent arrears, while he also had outstanding fines. He lived alone at the time, but was engaged and had wedding plans.

In Turkish media, it was sometimes reported that Tanis was a supporter of Kaplanism and by extension the Caliphate State, an Islamist movement designated a terrorist organsiation by Turkey. This was based on a report of the NCTV, which linked someone in Tanis' environment to Kaplanism. Said individual was the brother of Tanis, but it was noted that Tanis himself appeared to have no affiliation with the movement, with his drug addiction making it unlikely that he followed the movement's particularly stringent rules.

=== Prior criminal record ===
Tanis was a known repeat offender, with six arrests between 2012 and 2018, from minor offences such as insulting, driving under the influence, bicycle theft, burglary, and urinating in a police jail cell, to serious crimes like rape and assault with a deadly weapon.

In August 2011, Tanis and another man were recorded verbally harassing Chantal Hanse, then a reporter for GeenStijl, during a street interview by the Oudegracht. The video was popularly shared on the Dutch-language video site Dumpert.

On 7 December 2013, Tanis was arrested in Kanaleneiland after firing 10 shots at an apartment building with a 9mm Beretta while under the influence of alcohol. He was convicted of illegal possession of weapons & sentenced to 150 days in prison, 49 of which were conditional.

On 11 July 2017, Tanis raped a woman with whom he was acquainted through their joint cocaine addiction. On the day of the incident, Tanis had gone to her residence while drunk, then briefly left to assault and rob a teenage boy in the neighbourhood. Upon his return 20 minutes later, Tanis was also under the influence of narcotics and proceeded to rape and beat the victim. Tanis was arrested and indicted, claiming to police that the encounter had been consensual. Tanis faced trial for the rape two weeks before the tram attack. Two days before the shooting, he was released after a two-week sentence at Lelystad prison, where he had reportedly been further radicalised and was known for attacking guards with headbutts. He was due to serve four months in prison for a burglary committed in September 2018.

=== Legal proceedings and developments in prison ===
On 22 March 2019, Tanis confessed to being the sole perpetrator of the shooting. Another suspect was arrested but then released. A letter found in the hijacked car the suspect fled in suggested terrorist motivations; some witnesses claimed they heard the suspect say "Allahu akbar". The public prosecutor charged the suspect with four counts of murder with a terrorist motive.

On 1 July 2019, the contents of the found letter were made public. The letter read: "I am doing this for my religion. You people are killing Muslims and want to take our religion away from us. You will not succeed in that. Allah is great." (Dutch: "Ik doe dit voor mijn geloof. Jullie maken moslims dood en willen jullie ons geloof van ons afpakken, maar gaat niet lukken. Allah is groot.") Additionally, the silencer attached to the handgun used in the killings was inscribed with "texts referring to Islam", apparently emulating the writings on one of the rifles and its magazines used in the Christchurch mosque shootings three days earlier. In court, Tanis represented himself after denying his right to a court-appointed legal defence. He stated that he committed the shooting in retaliation for the killing of Muslims abroad, telling the judge "I wanted to show you people that you are not made of diamond and that we are not made of sand" ("Ik wilde laten zien dat jullie niet van diamant zijn en wij niet van zand.")

On 20 March 2020, Tanis was sentenced to life in prison. He was also convicted of the 2017 rape charge, but due to already getting a life sentence, no additional prison term was added. Instead, Tanis was required to pay the requested compensation of €30,000 to the victim.

On 17 February 2021, Tanis attacked two guards while incarcerated at De Schie prison in Rotterdam. One guard was stabbed with a home-made stabbing weapon in his face and neck. His minor injuries were treated in the hospital. A second guard had a pan of hot oil thrown at him, but was not injured. Tanis also destroyed gym and cooking equipment in the recreational room.

In March 2022, he was stripped of his Dutch citizenship and lost his passport.

In November 2024, Tanis was convicted of attempted murder, attempted severe assault and vandalism after a retrial for his 2021 assault case. No punitive measures had been imposed during a first trial, but an appeal was entered by the public prosecutor's office, arguing that even if a sentence would likely only be symbolic, crimes committed during incarceration by those with life sentences should still be punished. He received an additional 7 years imprisonment, which would be served in case of early release.

== Aftermath ==
After the attack, the threat level in the province of Utrecht was unprecedentedly raised to level 5, the highest level. After the suspect was caught, it was reduced to Level 4. Police presence was increased at railway stations, including Amsterdam, Rotterdam, The Hague, and Utrecht, and at the country's airports. Tram services in the city were cancelled. Elite police forces carrying semi-automatic weapons guarded Jewish community buildings. Mosques in the city were evacuated, and those elsewhere in the country were given increased security, likely due to the recent mosque shootings in New Zealand.

The day after the shooting, all national flags on government buildings in the Netherlands and at Dutch diplomatic posts were flown at half-mast on request of Prime Minister Mark Rutte. Dutch royal residences flew a black banner, symbolising mourning, alongside the customary royal standard.

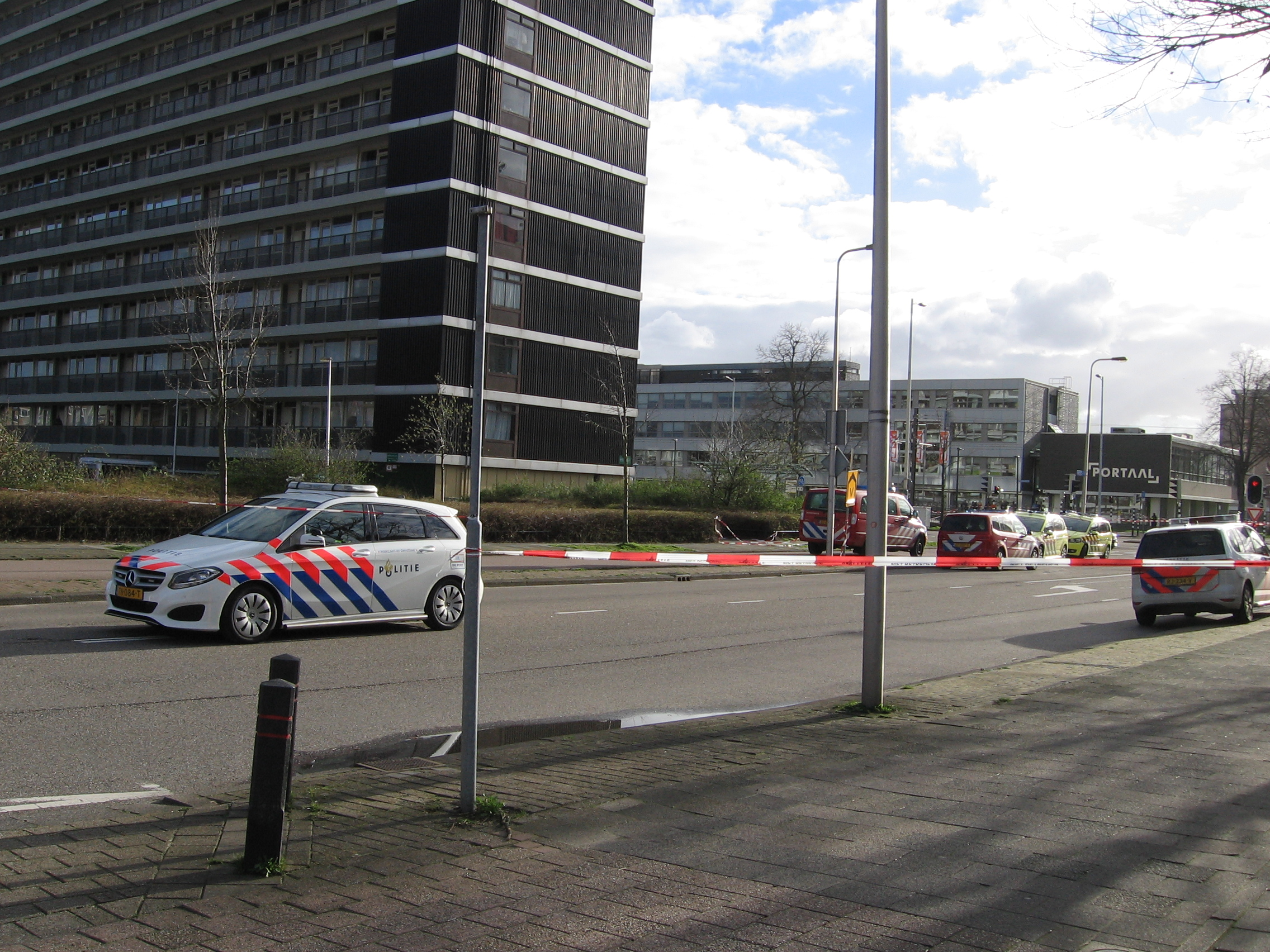
Police cars at the cordon near the 24 Oktoberplein, Utrecht, 18 March 2019.

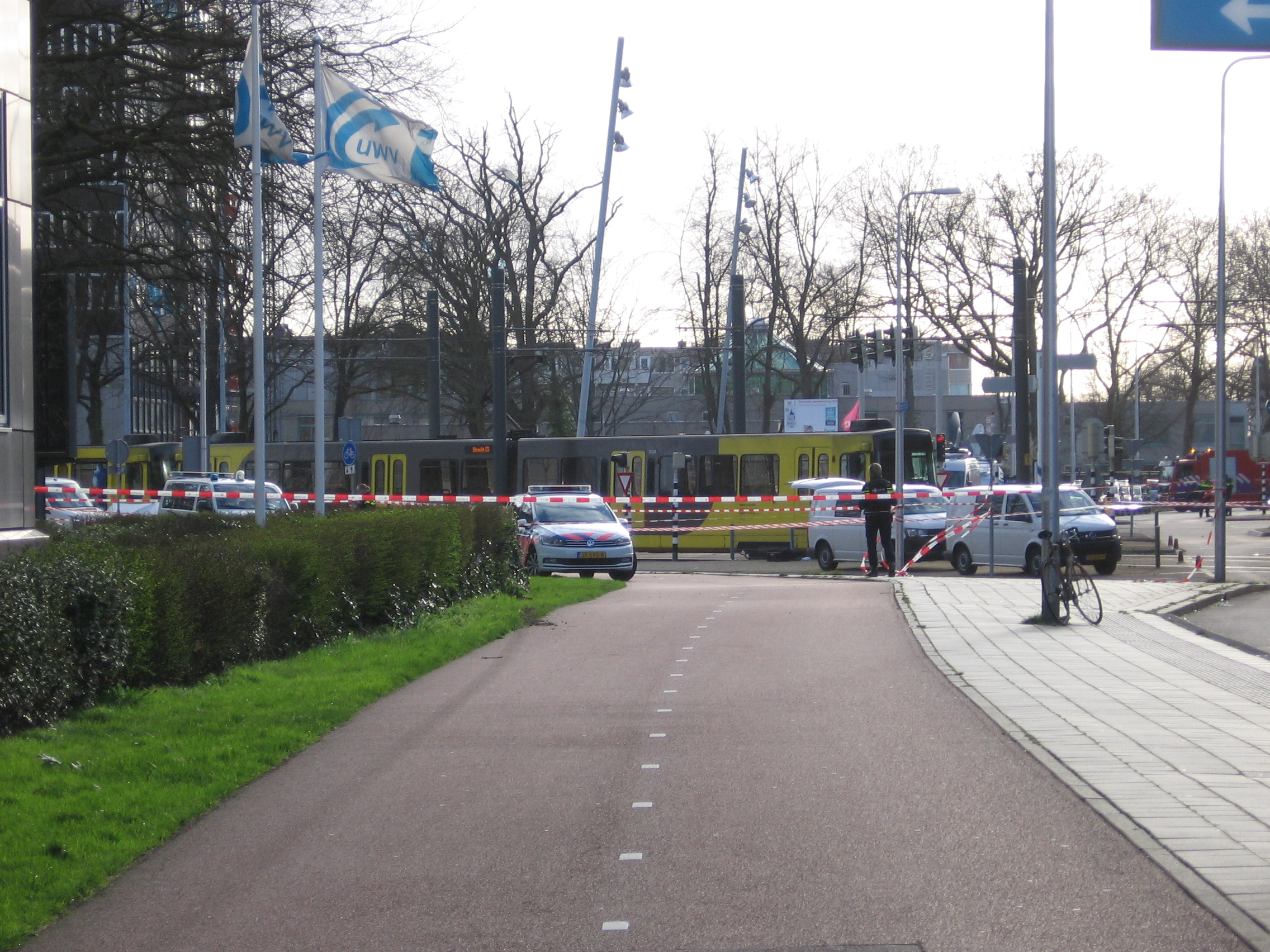
Cordoning of 24 Oktoberplein, Utrecht, 18 March 2019

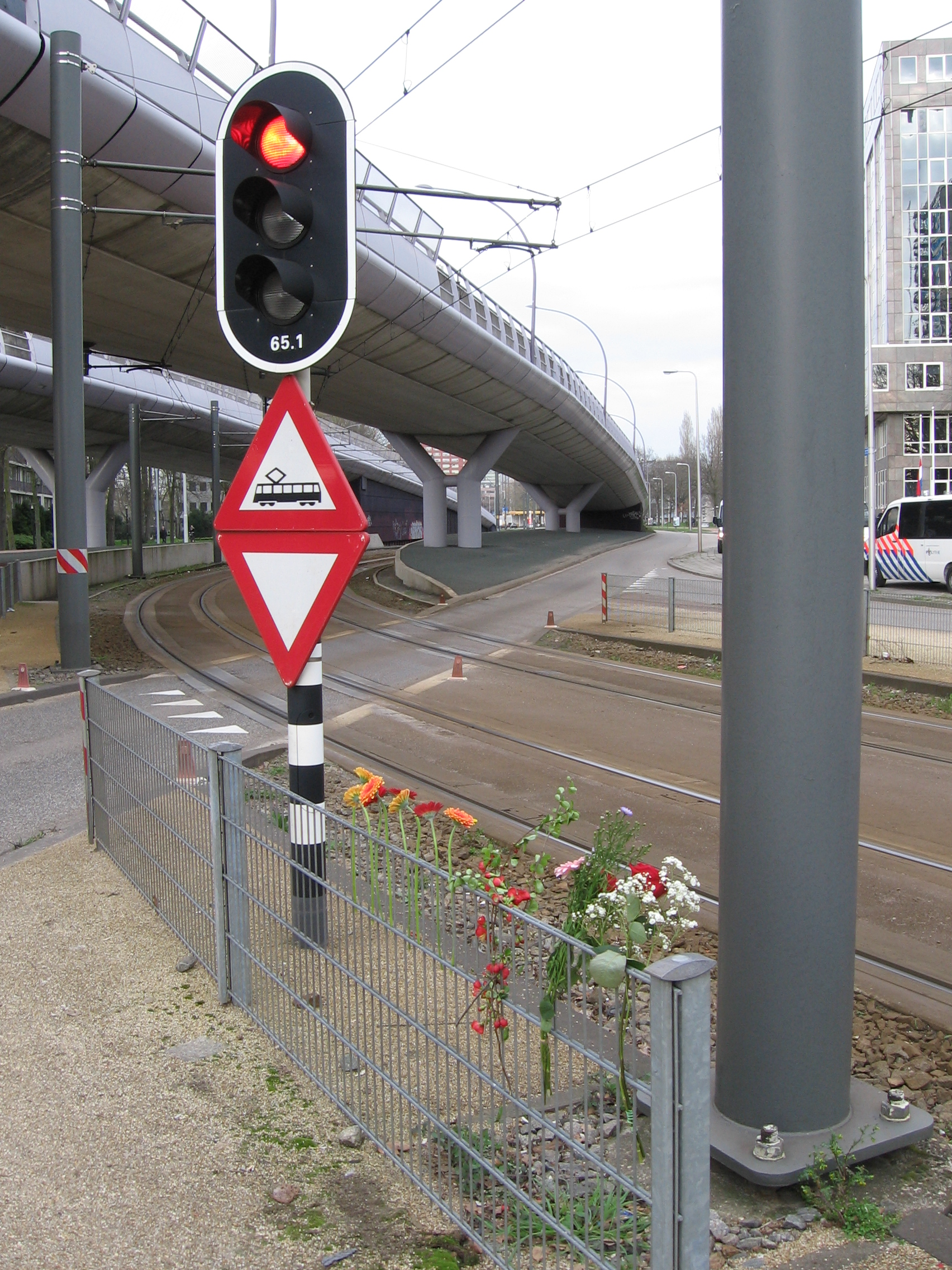
Flowers to commemorate the victims of the tram attack on 18 March 2019 at the 24 Oktoberplein, Utrecht

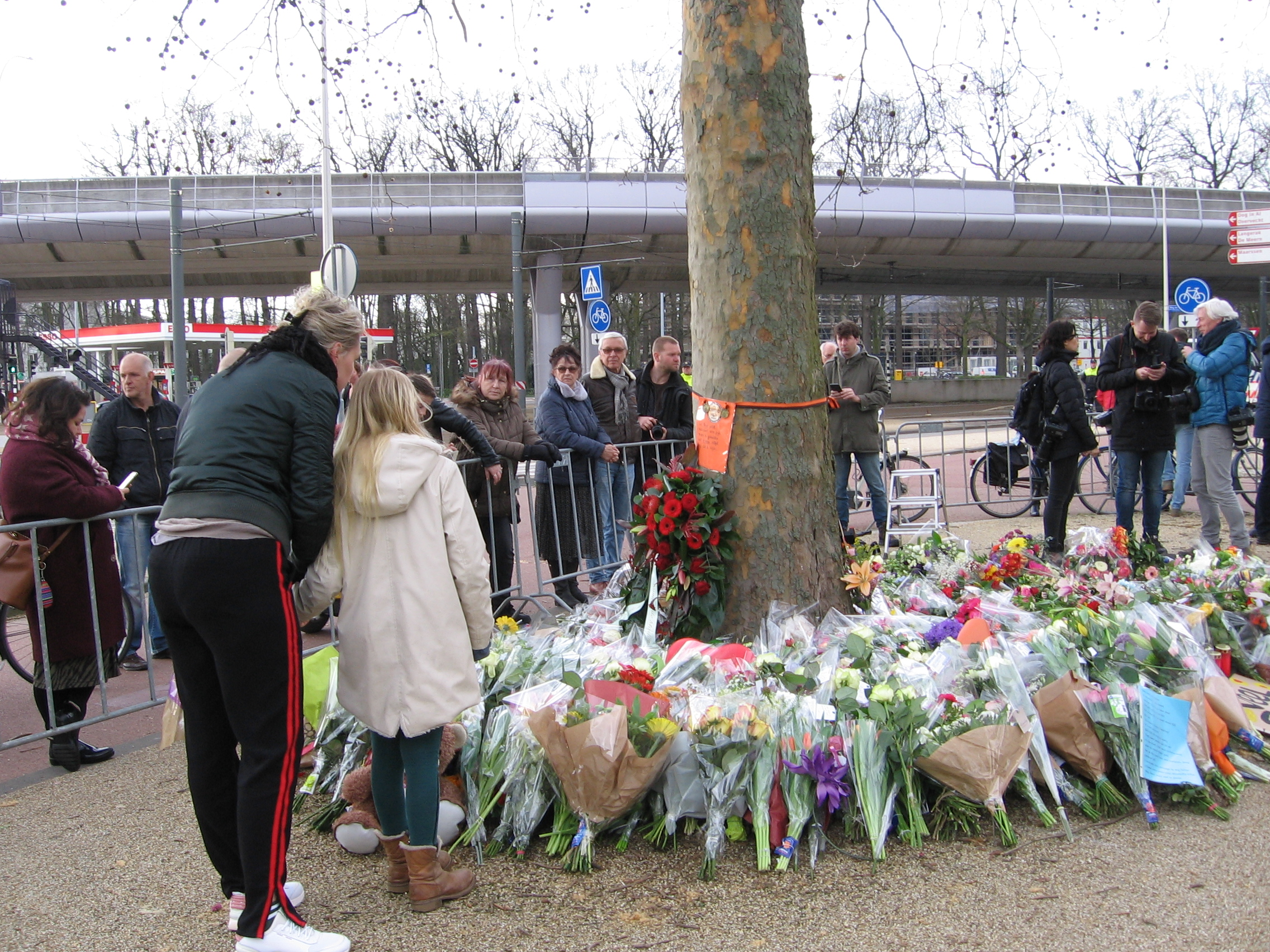
Local residents bring flowers to commemorate the victims of the tram attack

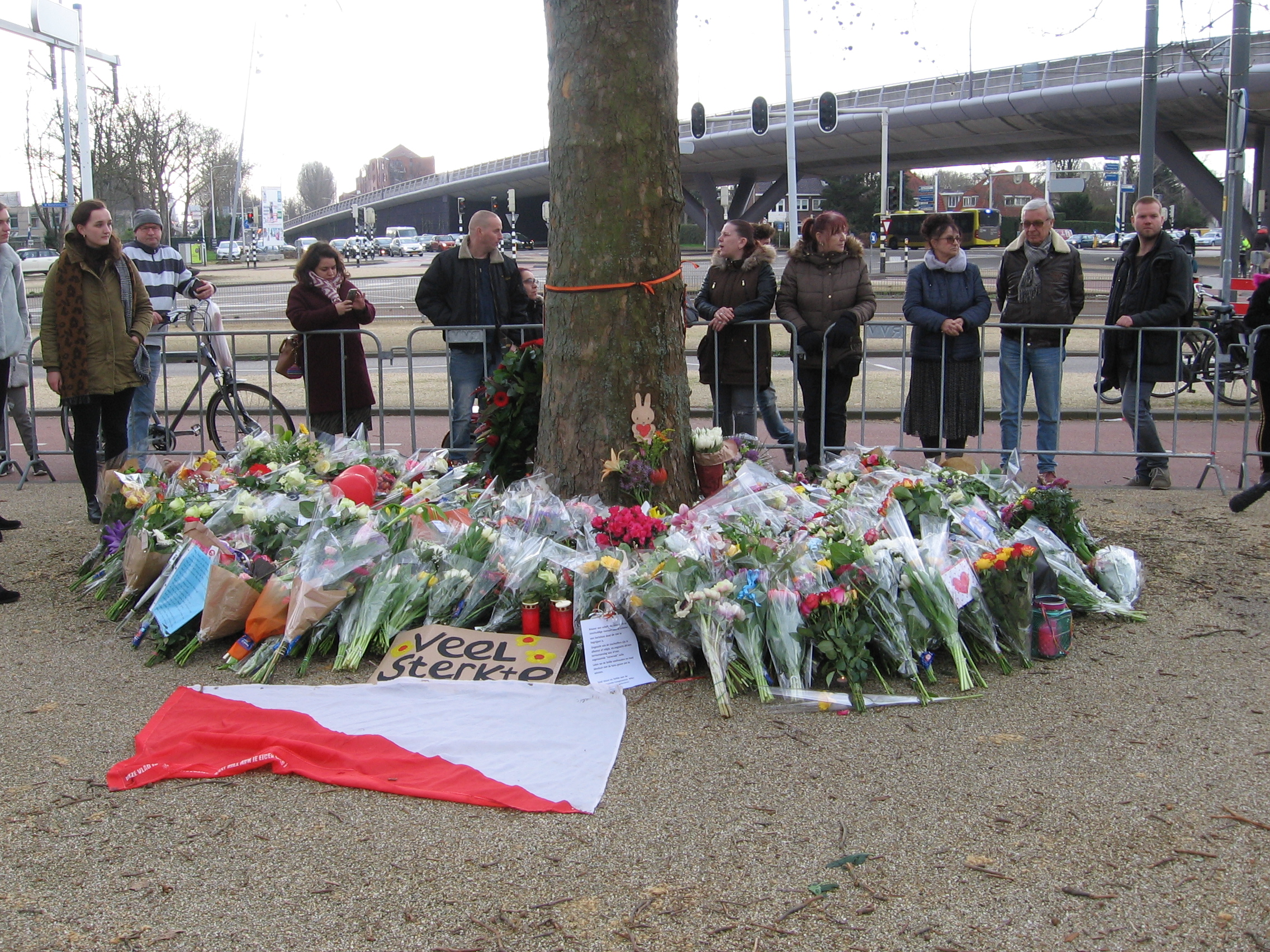
Local residents have brought flowers to commemorate the victims of the tram attack. City flag of Utrecht

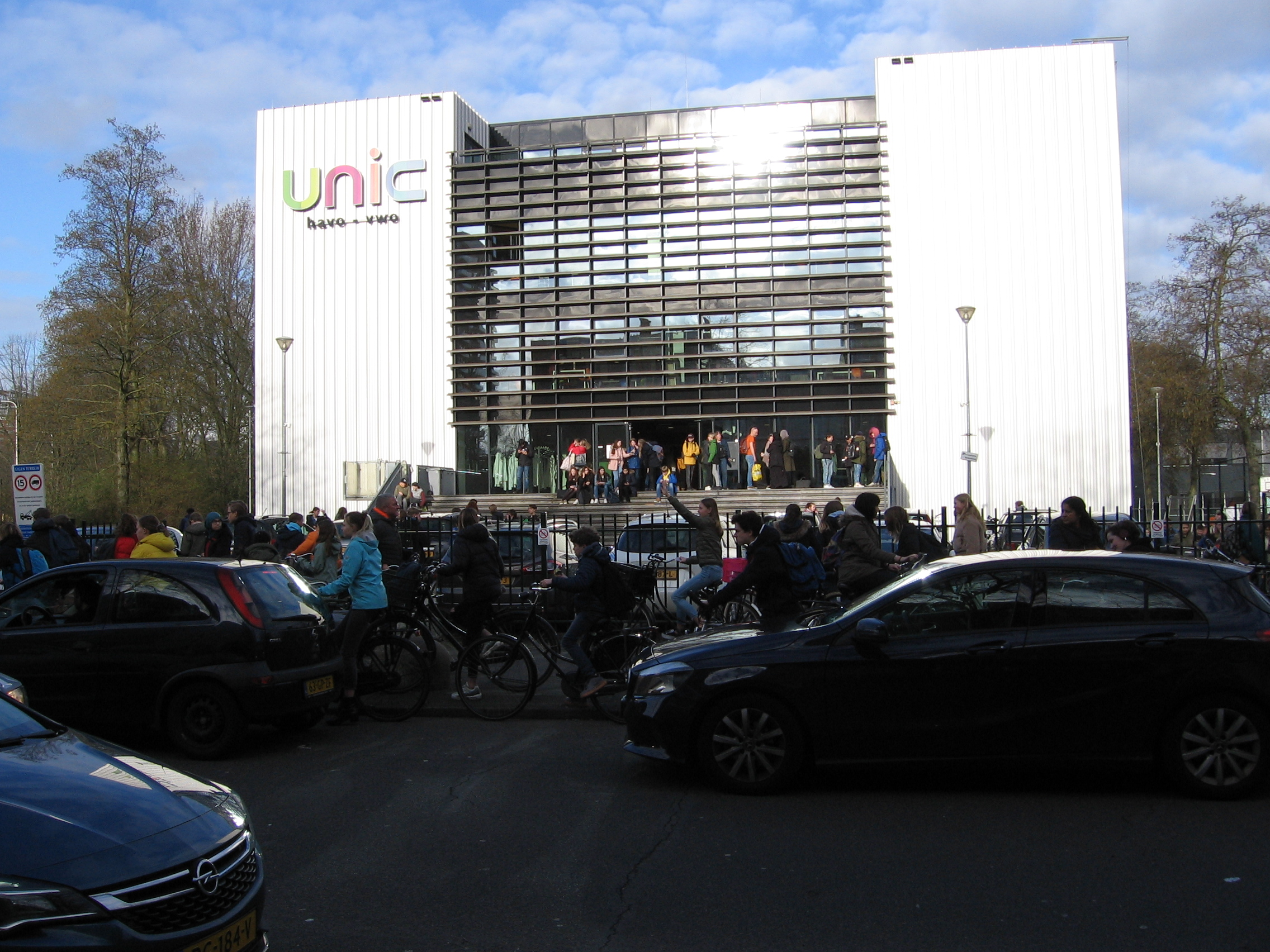
School children of UniC and the International School of Utrecht, Utrecht are allowed to go home after the alert for the tram attack 18 March 2019 afternoon

== 2023 commemoration ==
On 18 March 2023 the 2019 shooting was publicly commemorated by a speech by Mayor Sharon Dijksma near the location of the shooting. Flowers were laid down, and a special poem by city poet Ruben van Gogh was inaugurated. Due to the COVID-19 pandemic, no yearly commemorations were held in previous years. Dutch Minister of Justice and Security Dilan Yeşilgöz-Zegerius was present at the ceremony.

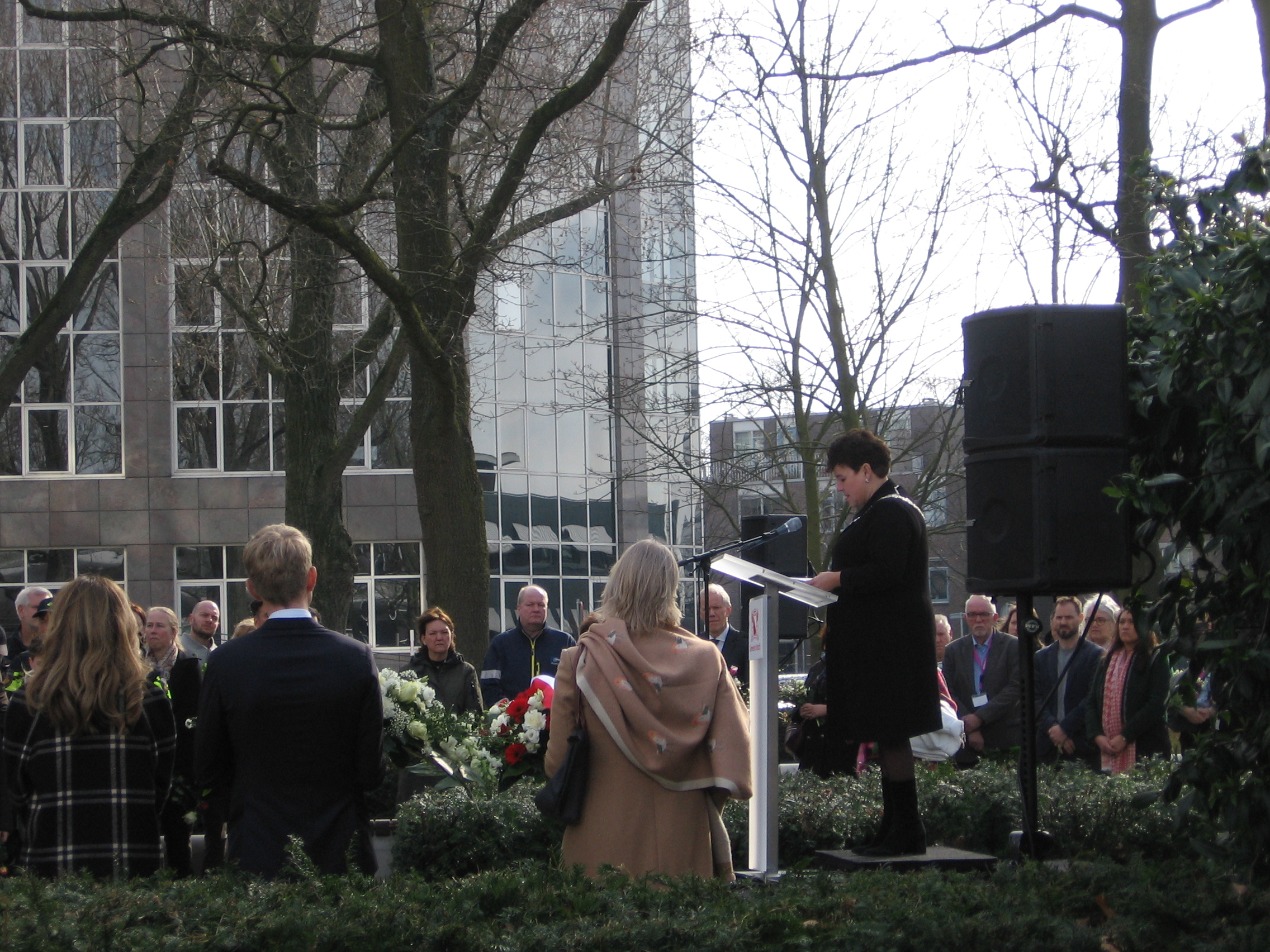
Speech by Utrecht Mayor Sharon Dijksma

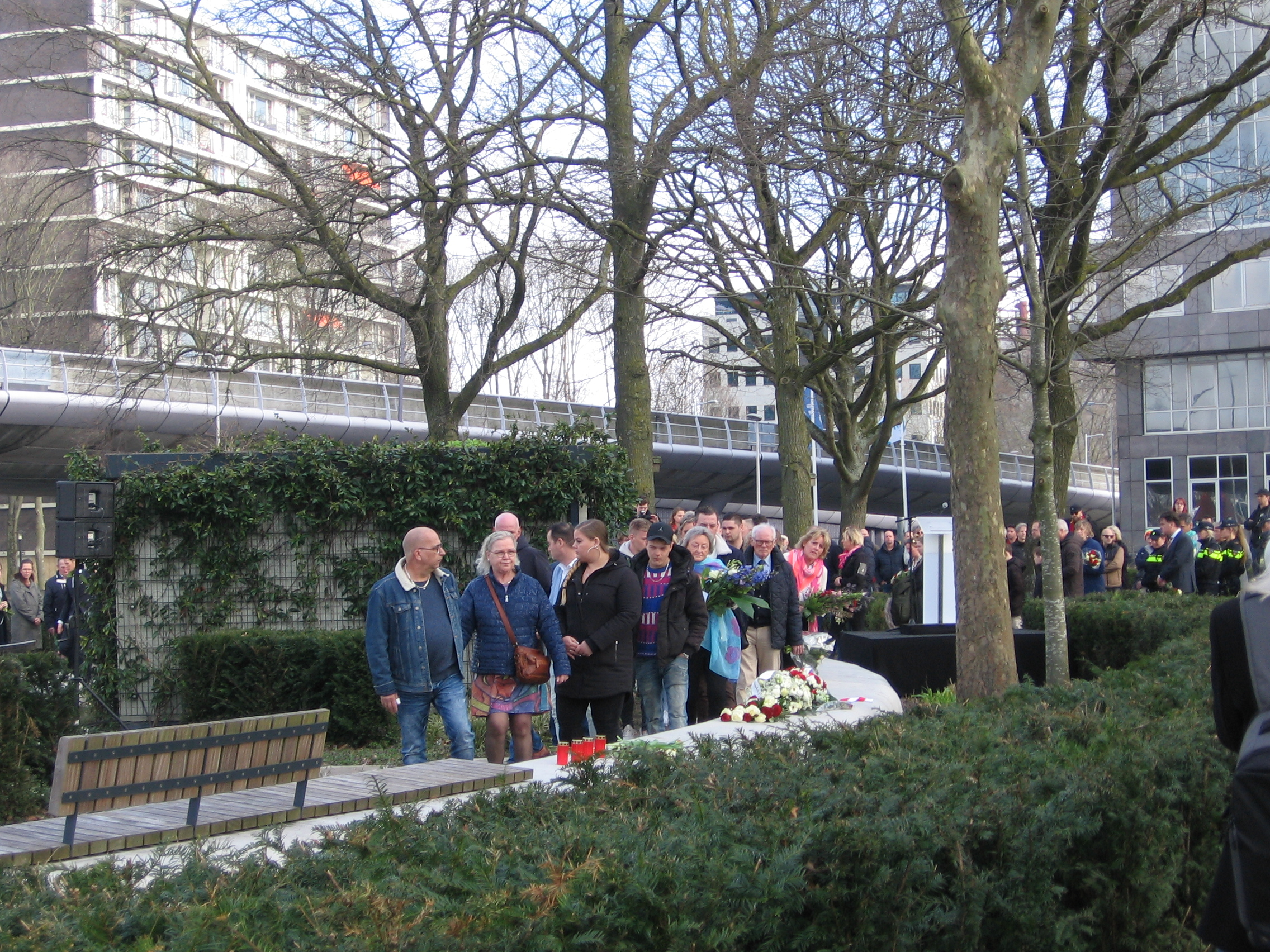
The public laid down flowers

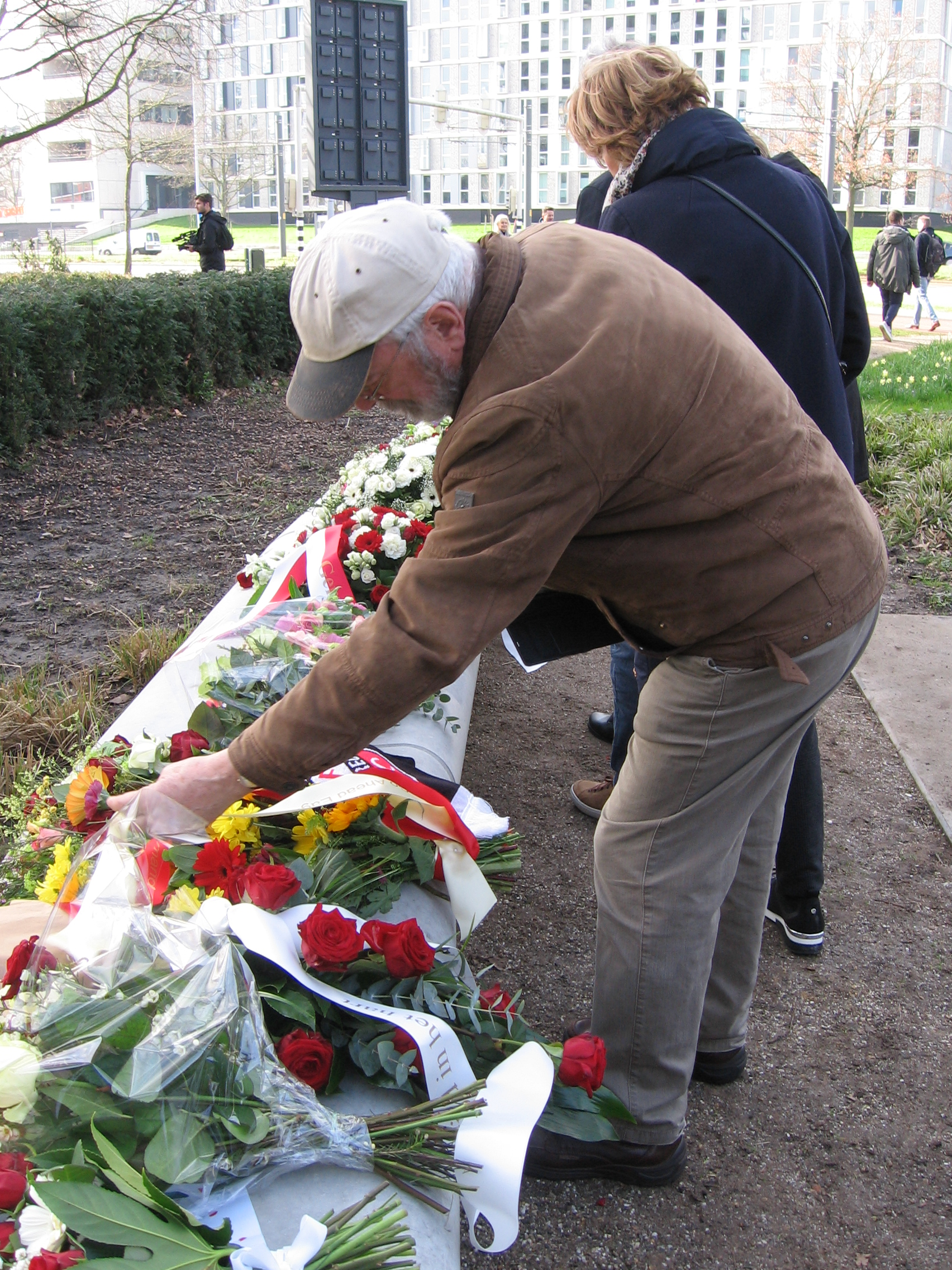
A participant adjusted the flowers

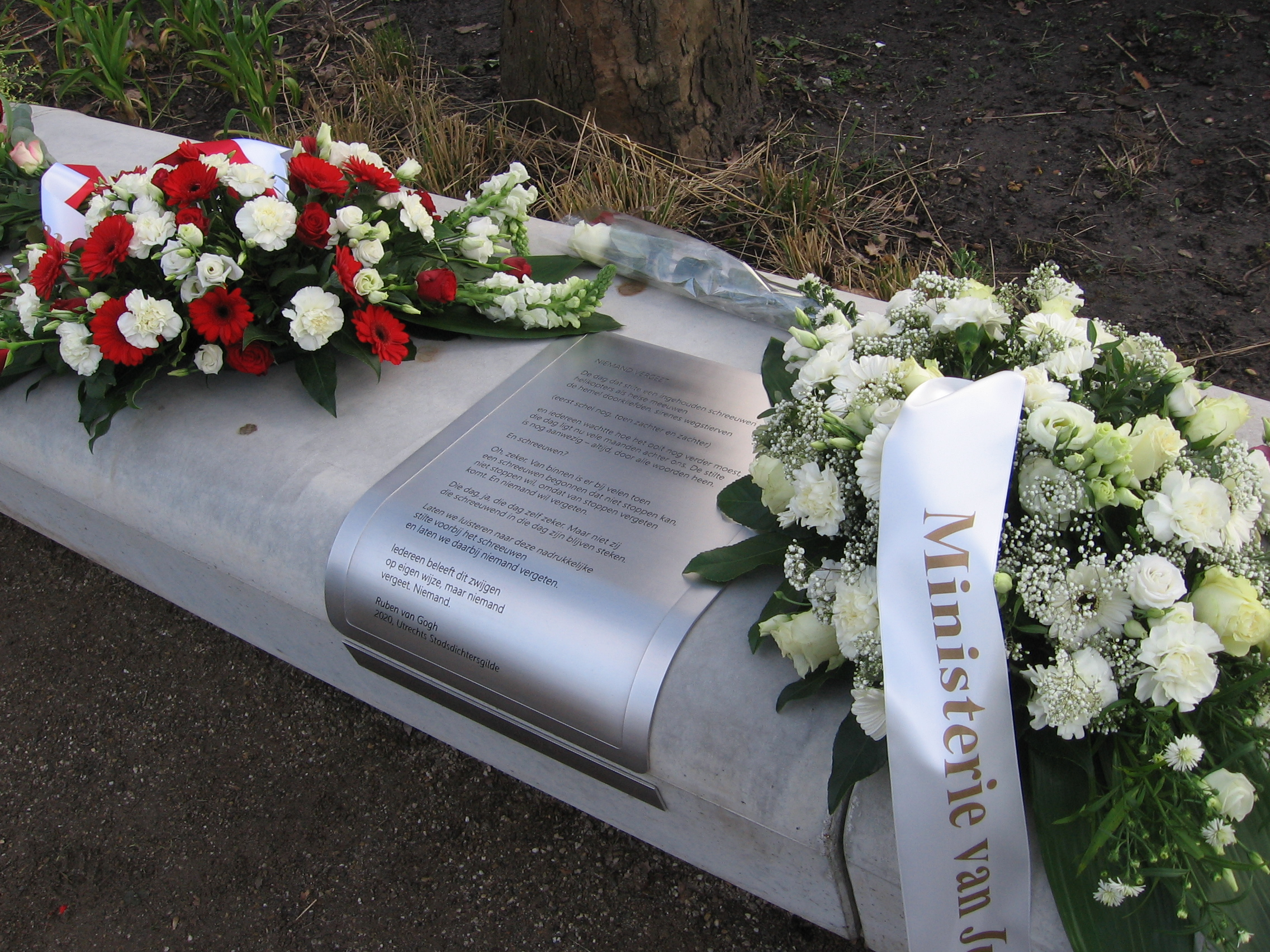
Poem by Ruben van Gogh

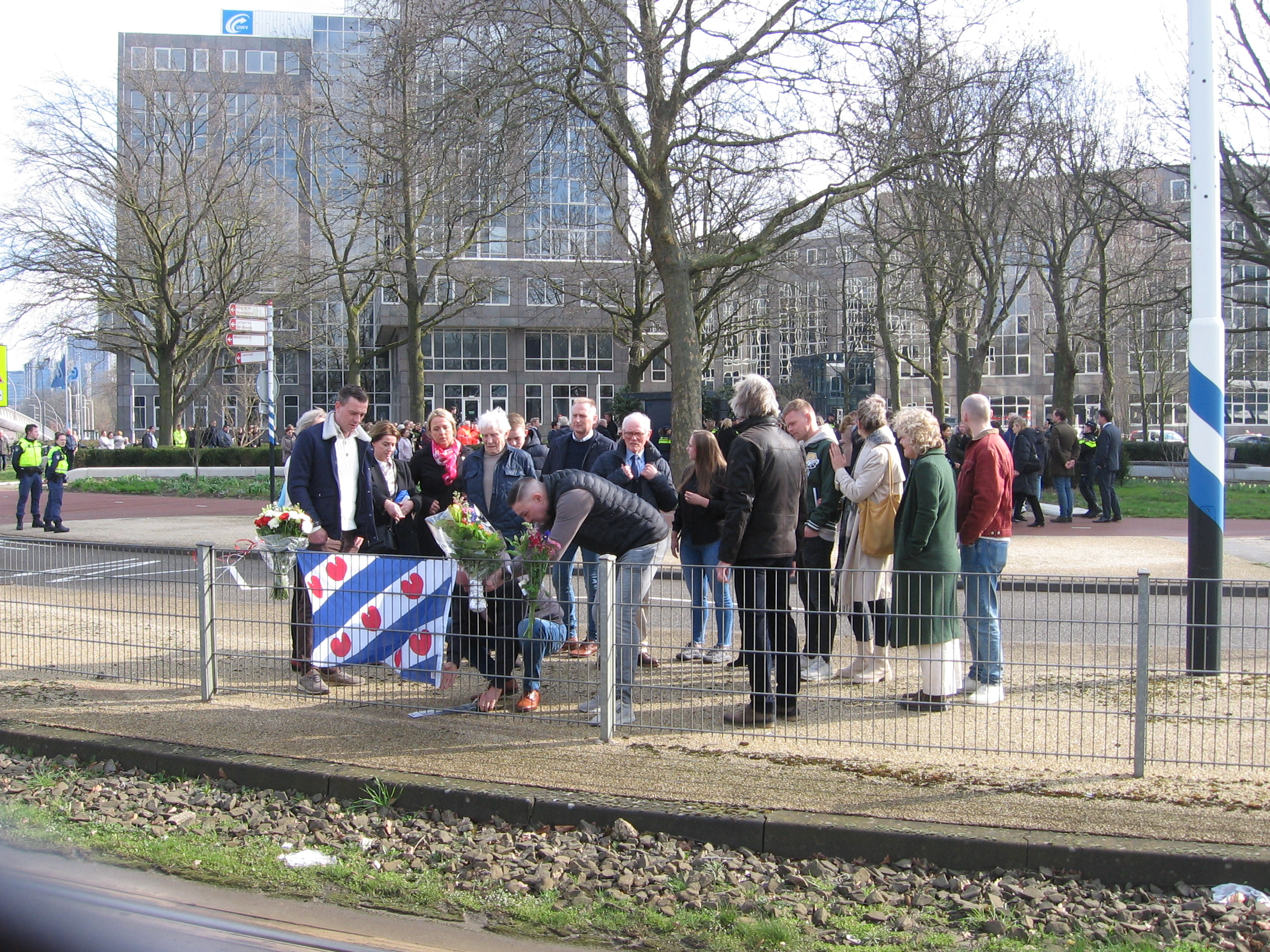
Family and friends attach flowers for a Frisian victim to the tram track fence

== See also ==
- Alphen aan den Rijn shopping mall shooting (2011)
- 2018 Amsterdam stabbing attack
- 2023 Rotterdam shootings
- 2025 Amsterdam stabbing attack
