= 2018 Amsterdam stabbing attack =

Terrorist attack in the Netherlands

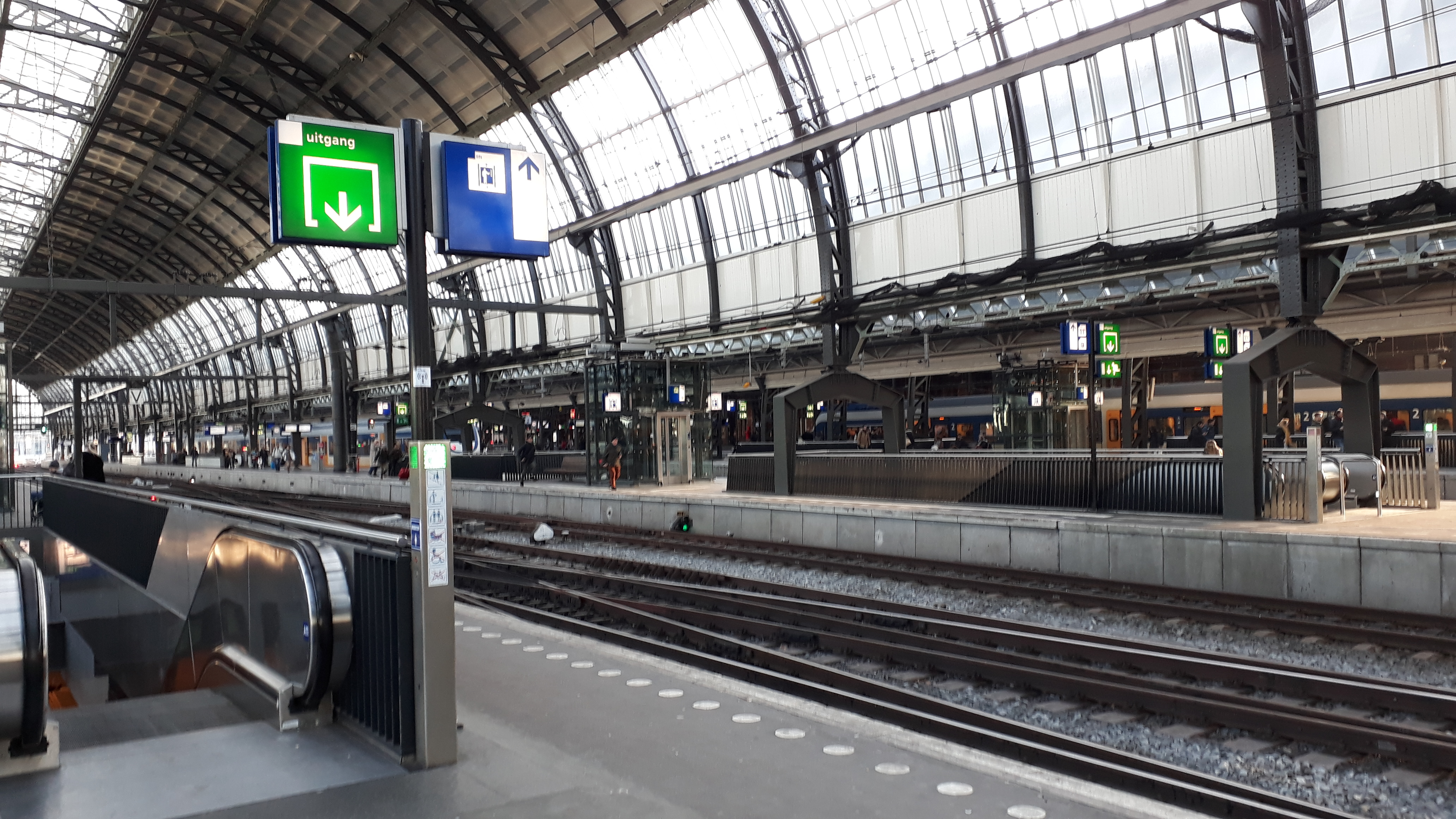
- Amsterdam Centraal
- Location: Amsterdam, Netherlands
- Date: 31 August 2018; 12:10 (CET)
- Target: Dutch citizens
- Attack type: Knife attack, Islamic terrorism
- Weapon: Knife
- Deaths: 0
- Injuries: 3 (including the perpetrator)
- Perpetrator: Jawed Sultani
- Motive: Islamic extremism, retaliation against "insults to Islam" in Netherlands
- Verdict: Guilty
- Convictions: Two counts of attempted murder with terroristic intent Threatening police (overturned)

On 31 August 2018, a knife attack occurred in Amsterdam Centraal station. Two American tourists were stabbed and injured in the station's western pedestrian tunnel before Amsterdam Regional Police shot and incapacitated the perpetrator, 19-year-old Afghan asylum seeker Jawed Sultani.

Authorities suspected an Islamist motive, later confirmed by questioning of the perpetrator, who admitted that the attack was a retaliatory act for disparaging statements against Islam by Party for Freedom leader Geert Wilders. In October 2019, Sultani was sentenced to 26 years and eight months imprisonment and required to pay €3,000,000 to the victims.

== Incident ==
At around 12:10 local time (CET) a man who had recently arrived by train was observed by security staff in the west side tunnel of Amsterdam Centraal Station. While they were discussing how to approach him, the man pulled out a knife and stabbed one tourist in the back, then attacked a second tourist.

Police officers were 20 m away drew their weapons, and when the perpetrator ran towards another potential victim one of the officers opened fire and brought him down.

The attack lasted nine seconds until the attacker was shot by police. Witnesses reported hearing two gunshots. Policemen ordered the suspect to "stay down" in English. The victims, who were "very badly injured" according to a police spokesman, and the suspect were taken to hospital.

== Aftermath ==
Train services were interrupted and the station, which was very busy on a Friday with many travellers from Amsterdam Schiphol airport, was temporarily closed.

As a result of this attack, on 28 September 2018, the United States Department of State raised its travel advisory for the Netherlands from Level 1 to Level 2.

== Victims ==
The victims were Americans with an Eritrean background who were in the country for a few days with their wives. They released a message of thanks via the US Embassy in Amsterdam. They thanked the Dutch police at the scene for their quick actions and for saving their lives as well as later support they received from police units and hospital staff. The US Embassy asked that the privacy of the victims be respected.

== Suspect ==
The attacker was identified as 19-year-old Jawed S. by Dutch authorities, in accordance with European privacy laws. The United States Department of State named him as "Jawad Sultani" following the trial. He had immigrated to Germany from Afghanistan in September 2015 and received a residence permit. The Federal Office for Migration and Refugees had rejected his application for asylum, which he had appealed. He resided in Ingelheim at the time of the attack, having travelled from there to Amsterdam the day of the attack.

Dutch police were in close contact with their German counterparts in regards to the suspect's background. A police spokesman initially stated that Amsterdam police were "seriously taking into account" "a terrorist motive", and this motive was later confirmed by the authorities. Dutch authorities said that he was aggrieved against Netherlands and believed that "the Prophet Muhammad, the Quran, Islam and Allah are repeatedly insulted" in the country, specifically referring to Geert Wilders. Sultani stated that he held all Dutch people accountable for the remarks.

== Trial ==
The public prosecutor demanded 25 years imprisonment for two attempted murders with terrorist intent. Describing the attacks as ‘shocking’, the public prosecutor said that the impact had been enormous. ‘The random choice of victims is especially frightening,’ he said. ‘He has not shown any remorse and would even appear to be a little proud of what he did.' 'But I assure you', he continued, 'the Dutch government will never give in to terrorism. In this country, discussions are conducted with words, not with knives.’

"The appeals court calls it a cowardly attack,'' it said in a statement, adding that "it is thanks to the very fast response of the police that there weren't more victims."

The Amsterdam District Court found Jawed Sultani guilty of two attempted murders with terrorist intent and threatening three police officers, and sentenced him to 26 years and eight months imprisonment.

The court said he took a train from Germany to the Dutch capital to avenge what he perceived as insults to Islam and did not know his victims were Americans.

The attacker is said to have only expressed remorse during his appeals case, but judges were unconvinced by his sincerity and "saw it as a way to reduce his sentence".

The two American victims were able to follow the appeals hearing via a video link.

The attacker was ordered to pay them a total of nearly €3 million euros in damages.

In November 2020, the court resentenced Sultani to 25 years imprisonment, as it was found that he had not actually threatened the arresting officers before his arrest.

== See also ==
- Utrecht tram shooting
- 2025 Amsterdam stabbing attack
