= Killing of Lisa from Abcoude =

2025 killing of a Dutch teenager

- Location: Duivendrecht, Netherlands
- Date: 20 August 2025
- Attack type: Stabbing
- Victim: Lisa
- Accused: 22-year-old man

The killing of Lisa refers to the violent death in Duivendrecht, Netherlands of a 17-year-old girl named Lisa from nearby Abcoude. As she was a minor at the time, her surname has been withheld for legal reasons.

She was attacked in the early morning hours of 20 August 2025, while cycling home after a night out in Amsterdam. A man who was also a suspect in at least one other sexual assault case was subsequently charged with murder by the prosecutor's office. The case received widespread national attention and sparked public debate around women's safety in public spaces at night.

== Attack ==
In the early hours of 20 August 2025, at around 3:30 AM, Lisa headed for her home in Abcoude on her electronic bicycle from the Leidseplein area, an approximate 14 kilometer (or 8.7 miles) bikeride. At 4:07, as she was traveling along the Holterbergweg in Duivendrecht she alerted emergency services following an attack by a man on a bicycle.

Police found her body at approximately 04:15 along the water's edge on Holterbergweg. She was killed by stab wounds.

Lisa's emergency call was confirmed by police, though they did not disclose details of the conversation. Surveillance footage captured much of her route, except for the final seven minutes. Investigators requested witnesses and dashcam footage from the area, especially from individuals in three specific vehicles seen between 04:10 and 04:30 on Holterbergweg: a scooter, a light-colored van, and a Birò vehicle.

== Legal proceedings ==
A suspect was arrested in a temporary asylum shelter in Amsterdam-Zuidoost the day after the killing. Initially, he was detained for a separate sexual assault case that happened at Weesperzijde five days before the attack on Lisa. The following day, suspicions were expanded to include involvement in Lisa's death. As of 29 August the identity of the man remained unclear, with conflicting reports regarding his age and nationality.

On 1 September 2025, the suspect was expected to appear in the judge's chambers for a procedural hearing regarding potential extension of pre-trial detention. The prosecution stated that more details would likely be revealed once facts had been firmly established.

The first pro-formal court session was held in Amsterdam on 25 November 2025. The suspect's identity remained unclear to the Public Prosecution Service as of that date. The investigation has not yet completed therefore the suspect has to appear in court pro forma every three months. On 2 February, the suspect was also charged with attempted rape, the incident allegedly taking place on 10 August of the previous year, allegedly punching a woman and telling her not to scream.

On 17 February 2026, the 22-year-old suspect confessed to the killing in court, along with the other incidents of rape and attempted rape.

== Impact ==
=== Public and societal response ===
Lisa's death sparked a national outcry and reignited discussions about women's safety in public spaces, especially at night. Feminist activist group Dolle Mina organised nationwide protest bike rides in at least 19 cities, including Amsterdam, Rotterdam, and Groningen. The events were aimed at reclaiming unsafe routes and drawing attention to societal responsibility for safety, particularly for women.

On Leidseplein in Amsterdam, a digital billboard displayed the message Wij eisen de nacht op ("We reclaim the night") in memory of Lisa. The campaign encouraged broader conversations about shifting responsibility for safety from potential victims to society at large.

=== Technological impact ===
In the days following the incident, over 85,000 people downloaded the Dutch emergency mobile app 112NL. The app, which allows for silent communication with emergency services and automatic location sharing, saw a 20% increase in downloads.

=== Community action ===
In Baarn, a local initiative was launched to improve nighttime safety for cyclists. A community-driven mobile app is in development to provide better protection for night cyclists, allowing users to share routes, alert each other, and connect in case of emergency.

=== Family response ===
Lisa's family, through the victim support organisation Namens de Familie, expressed deep grief and gratitude for the national support. They requested privacy to mourn the loss of their daughter and highlighted the widespread solidarity from friends, neighbors, and the broader community.

=== Significance ===
According to Marieke Liem, professor of safety and interventions at Leiden University, Lisa's death was highly unusual. Her research covering the period from 2015 to 2024 showed no other known cases in the Netherlands in which a minor girl was killed by an unknown assailant. Typically, perpetrators in cases of female homicide are known to the victim, such as partners or family members.
