= 2025 Amsterdam stabbing attack =

Mass stabbing in the Netherlands

- Location: Sint Nicolaasstraat, Amsterdam, Netherlands
- Date: 27 March 2025 c. 15:19 (CET)
- Attack type: Mass stabbing
- Weapon: Knives
- Deaths: 0
- Injuries: 6 (including perpetrator)
- Motive: Under investigation
- Accused: Roman D.
- Charges: Five counts of attempted homicide with terrorist intent

On 27 March 2025, a stabbing attack took place in the Sint Nicolaasstraat area in the vicinity of Dam Square in central Amsterdam, Netherlands, resulting in at least five injuries.

== Stabbing ==
The attack occurred shortly before 15:20 local time in the Sint Nicolaasstraat near Dam Square, one of Amsterdam's main tourist attractions. Initial reports received by police characterized the event as a potential robbery. Witnesses in the area described hearing "piercing screams" followed by momentary confusion among pedestrians and visitors. Several bystanders observed people rushing toward the scene where the attack occurred, while others fled from the area in panic. Police were called at around 15:30.

The victims are a 67-year-old woman and a 69-year-old man with American nationality, a 26-year-old man with Polish nationality, a 73-year-old Belgian woman and a 19-year-old local Dutch woman from Amsterdam.

The attacker fled the scene over Gravenstraat. On Nieuwendijk, the suspect was stopped and held down by a bystander. Video documentation of the incident revealed a man, later identified as a British tourist, restraining the suspect by applying pressure to his back while controlling his arm until police personnel arrived at the scene. Several other bystanders physically confronted the suspect, with one witness describing that "some guy kicked him and broke his ankle" when he attempted to flee. The same witness indicated that the suspect may have sustained facial injuries during the citizen's intervention. The tourist who managed to citizen's arrest the suspect has been given a hero's badge by Mayor Femke Halsema. The mayor stated that the British citizen preferred to remain anonymous, characterizing him as "very modest" with no desire for public recognition.

== Response ==
Amsterdam police mobilized significant resources following notification of the attack. The emergency response included approximately 14 police vehicles, motorcycle units, multiple ambulances, and a medical helicopter that landed directly on Dam Square. Authorities established extensive cordons across both Sint Nicolaasstraat and throughout Dam Square itself. During the immediate aftermath, law enforcement requested the public to avoid the vicinity to facilitate emergency operations and investigation procedures.

== Arrest of suspect ==
A suspect was arrested by police. Police appealed for bystanders to send them video or photos of the attack. The suspect was later identified as a 30-year old Ukrainian citizen from Donetsk referred to as "Roman D.". Police stated that they had difficulty verifying his identity as he carried several identity cards with different names, and refused to cooperate with law enforcement regarding his identity.

Prior to the attack, Roman D. was reportedly staying at the Delta Hotel located on the Damrak, approximately several hundred meters from where the stabbings occurred. Investigations determined that he had equipped himself with multiple knives, suggesting premeditation. Initial investigations suggested the victims were selected randomly, with no apparent targeted motivation. According to witness accounts provided to media outlets, the suspect attempted to flee the scene following the stabbings but was prevented from escaping by bystanders.

Following his arrest, he was transported to receive medical treatment for leg injuries sustained during his apprehension. As of 29 March, he was detained in the medical section of a correctional facility in Scheveningen. A court date was set for 1 April 2025 regarding his future in detention, and is being investigated by the National Police Corps on acts of terrorism.

In June 2025, it was established that Roman D. was a former Ukrainian Navy serviceman who enlisted in 2019 and participated in the Battle of Vuhledar during the Russo-Ukrainian war as part of the 503rd Separate Marine Battalion. Former colleagues stated that he appeared to have experienced a mental decline in 2023, having become moody and combative following a head injury during his station in Vuhledar. He reportedly switched between withdrawn and confrontational and had developed an obsession "over topics like Elon Musk, radical Islam, and cryptocurrency".

After his unit was merged into the 38th Marine Brigade, Roman D. told other military personnel, including his superior officer, that he fantasised about being imprisoned in Europe, mentioning Norway in particular, believing that he would "be cared for for the rest of his life". He studied the laws of various countries to figure out how to get a life sentence and voiced a willingness to commit murder for his goal. Roman D. deserted in January 2025, after he was granted leave, claiming he wanted to visit his mother in the Czech Republic. He instead travelled directly to the Netherlands via Poland. The forged documents on his person reportedly bore the names of five members of Roman D.'s unit. In January 2026, it was revealed that hotel staff at Delta Hotel had discovered Roman D.'s real passport, identity card, and credit card hidden in a wardrobe during cleaning in December 2025.

Roman D. refused to give a motive for the attack and failed to attend all four of his preliminary hearings the District Court of Amsterdam. While it was noted by others in Roman D.'s unit that he had started reading the Quran and often mentioned Allah, former fellow soldiers mentioned that he remained "very active in encouraging the LGBT community" and that they did not believe he held any extremist beliefs. On 12 January 2026, Roman D. was questioned for a second time after he made a potentially relevant statement about the motives during a psychiatrist session in jail, but he continued to refuse cooperation with authorities on the matter. It is still belived that Roman D.'s intent behind the stabbing was to "instill fear", due to which the terroristic charges remain. As of January 2026, he was being observed at the Netherlands Institute for Forensic Psychiatry and Psychology, with the possibility of committal to Pieter Baan Centrum for further examinations if Roman D. remains uncooperative.

== See also ==
- Killing of Lisa from Abcoude in Duivendrecht, 6 km southeast of Amsterdam’s city centre, six months later
- Utrecht tram shooting
- Ukrainian refugee crisis
- Terrorism in Europe
