= Kaplanism =

Islamic extremist ideology

Kaplanism (Turkish: Kaplancılık) is an Islamic ideology based on the thoughts of Mufti Cemaleddin Kaplan.

== Ideology ==
Cemaleddin Kaplan was once a member of the MSP before getting sent to Germany at the request of Necmettin Erbakan. There he received political asylum and joined the "Association of the New World View in Europe e.V." (AMGT), a Millî Görüş organization. In 1983, Cemaleddin Kaplan left the wider Millî Görüş movement due to its efforts to come to power through politics and elections. Kaplan then had his supporters distribute a 17-page announcement in front of the Barbaros Mosque in Cologne. Kaplan hated anything which he interpreted as Turkish nationalism, and had many disagreements with the AMGT over Turkish nationalism, patriotism, and the Turkish state, where he accused the AMGT of tolerating nationalism, and at times he had physically assaulted many AMGT members before leaving the organization. Around half of the AMGT associations and mosques also left and pledged allegiance to Kaplan.

Kaplanism is based on Islamic fundamentalism, Islamic extremism, Jihadism, and a staunch opposition to any and every forms of Turkish nationalism. Kaplanists claim that a jihad against Turkish nationalists is necessary for dissolving Turkey and establishing the "Caliphate State" as an official state. Cemaleddin Kaplan stated that Turkey was created by the Jews and the Freemasons, and claims that Turkey's existence harms Islam. Cemaleddin Kaplan was greatly inspired by Ruhollah Khomeini's victory in the Iranian Revolution, and visioned himself doing the same in Turkey. Kaplan then declared himself caliph-in-exile by gathering a shura, and announced his wishes of dissolving Turkey and forming a Sharia-ruled caliphate, and his followers became Kaplanists. He then formed the Caliphate State. During his stay in Europe he refused to associate with any Turkish establishment which is linked to the Turkish state, such as DİTİB or any Millî Görüş organization, and he was also hostile to other religious Turks whom he accused of sympathising with Turkey. Metin Kaplan declared himself caliph after his father Cemaleddin's death, and he then declared Turkey to be Dar al-Harb, later launching a series of failed attacks.

In 2004, it was stated that there was around 500 Kaplanist Turks in France.
