= Metin Kaplan =

Turkish Islamist (born 1952)

Metin Kaplan (born 14 November 1952) is a Turkish Islamist and the leader of the extremist movement Kalifatsstaat ("Caliphate State") which is based in Cologne, Germany.

== Kalifatsstaat ==
Kaplan was born in the Turkish province of Erzurum. Kaplan, who was prosecuted as an enemy of the state in Turkey and faced the death penalty, sought political asylum in Germany and traveled there in 1983 as a refugee, together with his father, Cemaleddin Kaplan (also known as Cemaleddin Hocaoğlu), who was a leading figure in Islamist circles among Turkish diaspora in Germany. His father ran two publications: "Tebliğ" and "Ümmet".

After his father's death in 1995, Metin Kaplan became leader of the Caliphate State.

The movement's stated goal is to overthrow the government of Turkey and establish an Islamist state in the country. The movement was previously known as the "Union of Islamic Associations and Communities" and is on Turkey's official list of terrorist organizations as "Hilafet Devleti" (literally: "Caliphate State"). The self-styled "Caliph of Cologne" chose the city of Cologne as his residence. After being closely watched by the German Verfassungsschutz for several years, the movement was outlawed in 2001.

The movement has published a text called "The New World Order" which contains:

Our goal is the control of Islam over everyday life. In other words, the Koran should become the constitution, the Islamic system of law should become the law, and Islam should become the state... Is it possible to combine Islam with democracy and the layman's system on which it is based? For this question only one answer exists, and that is a resounding "NO!"

== Arrest ==
His rival İbrahim Sofu was murdered in 1997. Kaplan was convicted by a German court of solicitation of murder and spent four years in jail.

In May 2004, after reassurances that he would not be tortured if he was extradited to Turkey, a German court rescinded his refugee status and authorised his extradition to Turkey. Shortly after the court's decision, before German police could arrest him, Kaplan disappeared from Cologne. After the court decision was temporarily suspended, Kaplan reappeared on 31 May, claiming to have been sick during his disappearance.

On 12 October, the Verwaltungsgericht of Cologne decided that Kaplan could be extradited despite a pending appeal to the Bundesverwaltungsgericht in Leipzig. He was arrested in an internet cafe in Cologne and brought to the Düsseldorf airport, where a chartered Lear Jet took him to Istanbul. On arrival he was immediately arrested by Turkish police and taken to prison. This extradition case is unusual because governments usually refuse to extradite people to face trial for political crimes such as treason and espionage.

Kaplan's trial started on 20 December 2004. In 2005, Kaplan was convicted of attempting to overthrow the constitution and treason. He was sentenced to aggravated life imprisonment. During the trial, Kaplan was confined to the high security prison of Tekirdağ. Turkish authorities have accused him of plotting a terrorist attack against the Turkish government in 1998 and a plot to attack the Anıtkabir by flying a Cessna laden with explosives into it. Kaplan conceded that he believes the state of Turkey should be replaced with an Islamist state, but denies ever having planned to resort to violent means.

== Release from prison and acquittal after retrial ==
Kaplan's sentence was reduced to 17.5 years in prison in 2010, and he was released from prison in November 2016. He was ultimately acquitted after a retrial on 16 February 2021.
