= Caliphate State =

Turkish Islamist group based in Cologne, Germany

Caliphate State Hilâfet Devleti Kalifatstaat
- Leader: Metin Kaplan
- Founder: Cemaleddin Kaplan
- Founded: 1984
- Banned: 2001
- Headquarters: Cologne, Germany
- Ideology: Sunni Islamism; Kaplanism
- Religion: Sunni Islam

Caliphate State (Turkish: Hilâfet Devleti; German: Kalifatstaat) is a Turkish Islamist group based in Cologne, Germany. It was banned by the German government in 2001.

== History ==
The Caliphate State was founded in 1984 as the "Union of Islamic Community and Associations" in Cologne by Cemalettin Kaplan after he left a Millî Görüş organization due to ideological disagreements. It started to use the name "Anatolian Federated Islamic State" in 1992 and then changed it to "Caliphate State" in March 1994. It is strongly against the Republic of Turkey and aims to dissolve it. It also views Diyanet and DİTİB as unauthentic and corrupt due to them being part of the Turkish government. The group had over 7,000 members in the early 1990s, mostly in Germany, but also in the Netherlands and Turkey. The Caliphate State sent a delegation to Al-Qaeda and established connections to Osama bin Laden in Afghanistan.

With the death of Cemalettin Kaplan in 1995, his son Metin Kaplan took over leadership of the organization. Metin Kaplan, who led the organization during its attempted attack on Turkish Republic Day, was arrested in Germany in 2000, and was extradited to Turkey in 2004. Metin Kaplan plead his innocence despite concurrently praising the attack as a Jihad. Some members of the organization were arrested as a result of the operations carried out by Turkish police units on October 28, 1998 during the attempted Turkish Republic Day attacks.

The Caliphate State is a designated terrorist group in Turkey.

The group had an estimated 1,300 members at their peak, and its stronghold was in Cologne and other parts of North-Rhine Westphalia.

A weekly newspaper of the organization called Ümmet-i Muhammed was also published.

=== Ban and legal actions ===
In 2001 the German government announced a ban of the organisation after it had been on the Federal Office for the Protection of the Constitution watchlist for many years.

Caliphate State challenged this decision in Federal Constitutional Court in 2003, which rejected the application, finding that the militant nature of the group made it unconstitutional and a threat to democracy. Caliphate State appealed to the European Court of Human Rights, however the appeal was dismissed, with the court ruling that "banning of associations...deemed as a concrete and current threat to the principles and fundamental rights of the democratic constitutional order and to the rule of law is legitimate."

The banning order stated that the group "violates the principle of democracy since it demands the primacy of the Sharia law over democratic institutions."

In 2022 the Landeskriminalamt raided 50 locations, seized firearms and €270,000 in cash and arrested three individuals in connection with the activities of the organisation.

== See also ==
- Turkish Islamic Jihad
- İBDA-C
