= Kanaleneiland =

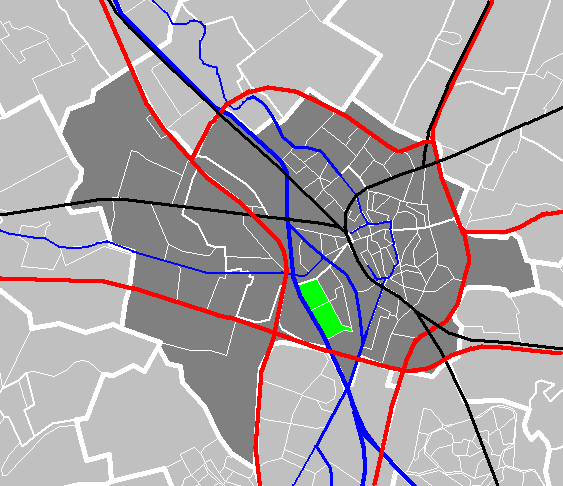
- Kanaleneiland within Utrecht

- Location within Netherlands
- Country: Netherlands
- Province: Utrecht
- City: Utrecht

Area
  - Total: 1.27 km^{2} (0.49 sq mi)

Population (2007)
  - Total: 15,614
- Website: Southwest district (in Dutch)

Kanaleneiland (Dutch pronunciation: [kaːˈnaːlənˌɛilɑnt, -ləˌʔɛi-], Utrecht dialect: [kɑːˈnɑːlə(n)ˌailænt]) is a district within the southwestern section of the Dutch city of Utrecht, adjacent to the Amsterdam-Rijnkanaal. It is divided into two sections, Kanaleneiland-Noord and Kanaleneiland-Zuid.

== Social conditions ==
In 2005 Kanaleneiland was listed as one of 40 "problem neighborhoods" that required extra attention by the Dutch Ministry of Housing. Kanaleneiland's residents have low levels of employment, health, and education. Approximately 76% of the population have at least one parent who was not born in the Netherlands, most of them being of (partial) Moroccan background. This unique political climate is one that shaped the views of one of its ex-residents, national politician Geert Wilders of the PVV, who lived in the area in the late 1990s. During his time in Kanaleneiland, Wilders lived in an apartment complex on the Marco Pololaan, a busy street overlooking the Columbus park. This apartment complex is located above a Lidl supermarket, and has seen an increase in popularity among right-wingers.
