= Estrima Birò =

Small-sized, electronic vehicle

Birò

Overview
- Type: microcar
- Manufacturer: Estrima
- Production: June 2009–present

Body and chassis
- Class: electric light quadricycle mopeds

Powertrain
- Electric motor: two brushless 48V

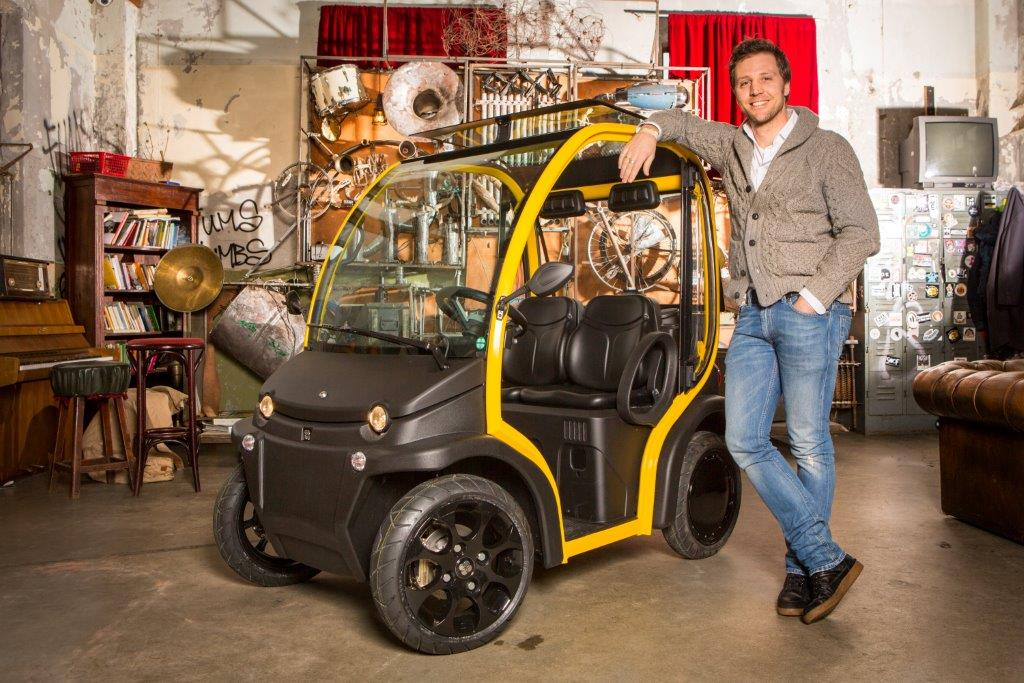
Matteo Maestri, CEO of Estrima, and a Birò microcar

Birò is a brand of four-wheeled electric micro vehicles with two side-by-side seats. It is produced and distributed by Estrima, an Italian company located in Pordenone. It falls within the category of electric mopeds, specifically light quadricycle mopeds.

In some countries it is legally comparable to a 50 cc (3.1 cu in) moped: its maximum speed is 45 km/h (28 mph) and can go up to 55 km/h (34 mph) with a minor controller update.

== History ==
Estrima was founded in 2008 by its president, Matteo Maestri, as a startup company. Maestri intended to introduce the family corporation Brieda Srl. into emerging sectors. Estrima's mission is to reduce urban mobility problems such as traffic congestion and pollution by introducing the smallest four-wheel micro electric vehicle to the market, the Birò. Vehicle production started in June 2009. In 2010 and 2011 Birò was the most registered electric vehicle in Italy among two, three, and four wheel categories. At the end of 2012, Red Circle Investments, the company of the Rosso family, acquired 30 percent of the shares of Estrima.

== Features ==
=== Aesthetic ===
Birò is the smallest four-wheel electric vehicle available; it is 1.03 m (41 in) wide and 1.74 m (69 in) long. The vehicle has a reinforced dark-green roof and rear glass, a compartment, a headrest, and an armrest. The roof can be opened for ventilation. Available accessories are kit doors, radio pre-installation and an external trunk trolley.

The Birò has larger windows than other microcars, resulting in better visibility for the driver.

The structure of the Birò is made of 3mm thick tubular steel, protecting the driver and the passenger.

=== Technical ===
The very low centre of gravity of Birò ensures stability and good road grip.

The Birò is driven by two brushless 48V electric motors, mounted directly in the rear wheels, producing a total of 4 kW of power. Thanks to the electric motors it has great pickup power that can be further increased by pulling the "boost" lever.

For the Birò two different kinds of batteries are available, a pure lead battery and a lithium battery. Depending on the type of battery, the Birò has a range of about 40 or 70 km, varying according to temperature, driving style, travel type and weight.

=== Consumption ===
1. On a low-range or urban cycle, with many start-stop process, the Biro uses 78 Wh/km.
2. On a mid-range or combined usage, mixing urban traffic and driving open roads, consumption decreases to 64 Wh/km.
3. On a maximum-range, or extra-urban trip, with open roads, including hills, provided the "Boost" function is not used it can achieve 55 Wh/km.

On the maximum range, if a consumption indicator has been installed, the Ah consumed is the same as the kilometres travelled (25 Ah = 25 km).

=== Power ===
The current used by the Birò for normal operations is restricted to a maximum of 80 A with a voltage ranging from 36 V to 53 V.

A so-called boost function can be selected for uphill driving. When this function is used the current can temporarily be increased to a restricted maximum of 130 A.

1. The "boost" function is restricted as the normal current by the temperature sensor on each motor and by the "36V" low alert voltage.
2. At 36 V, the Biro controllers restrict the current to "stay at 36V" ... the speed and torque decrease dramatically (it's not a "reserve indicator").
3. The "reserve" way of the Biro it's more like you feel a low torque because of the decrease of the voltage of the battery.

During normal operation the "in drive" voltage is 48 V (in 80 A mode) or 46 V (in 130 A mode).

On "reserve" range, the voltage is 45 V (80 A) and 43 V (130 A) so, at that point, one must find a way to quickly reach a point of recharge.

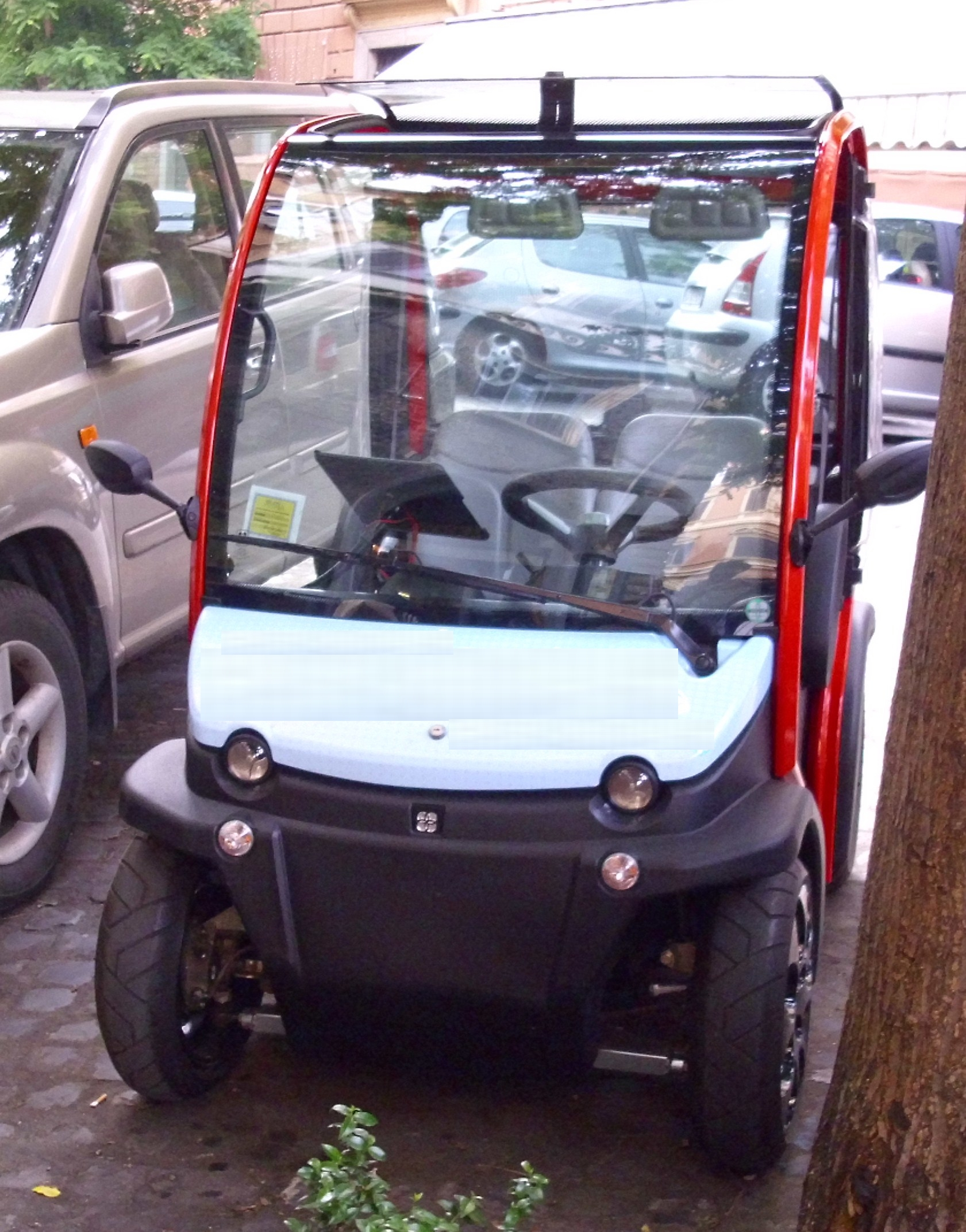

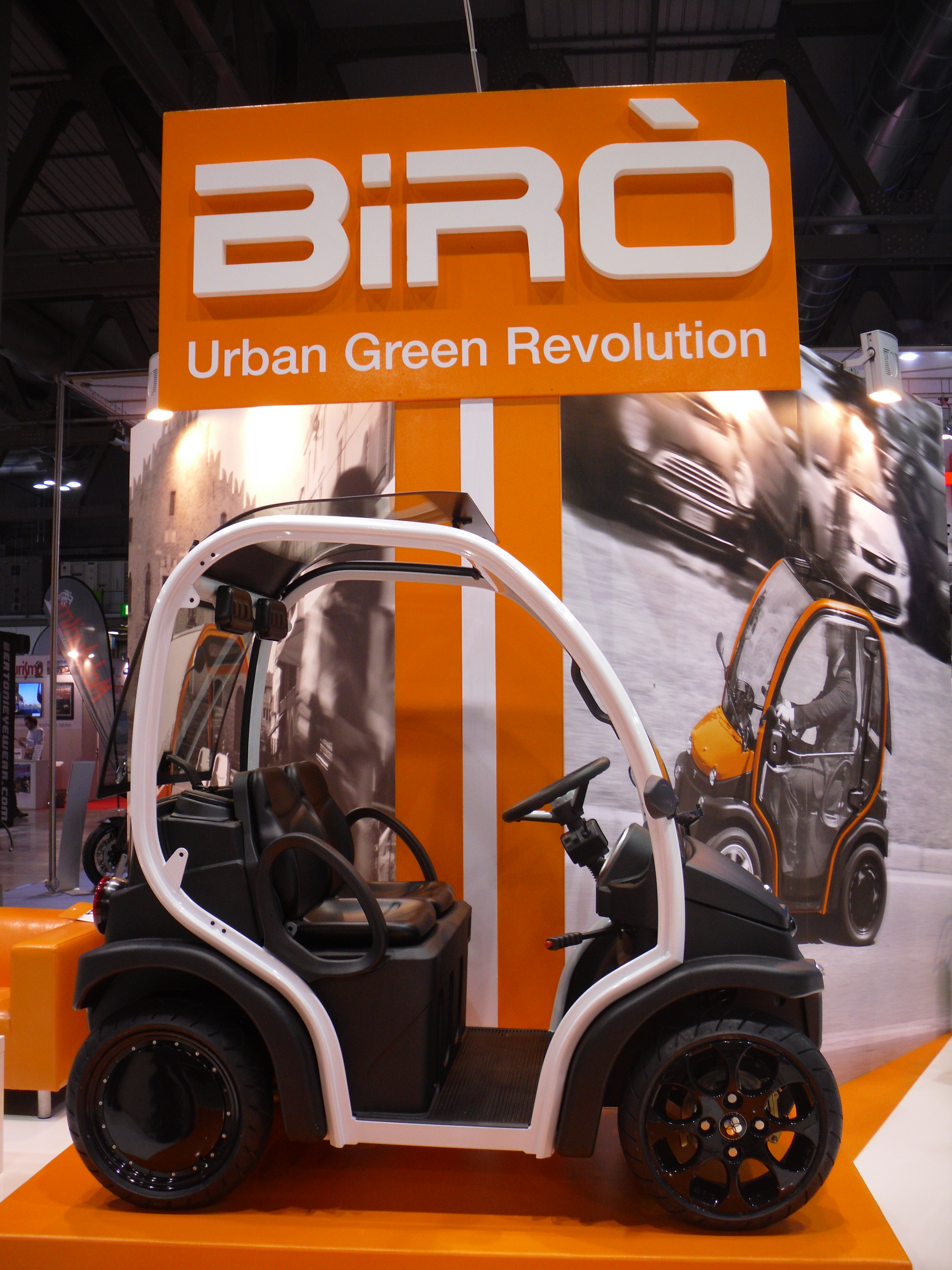

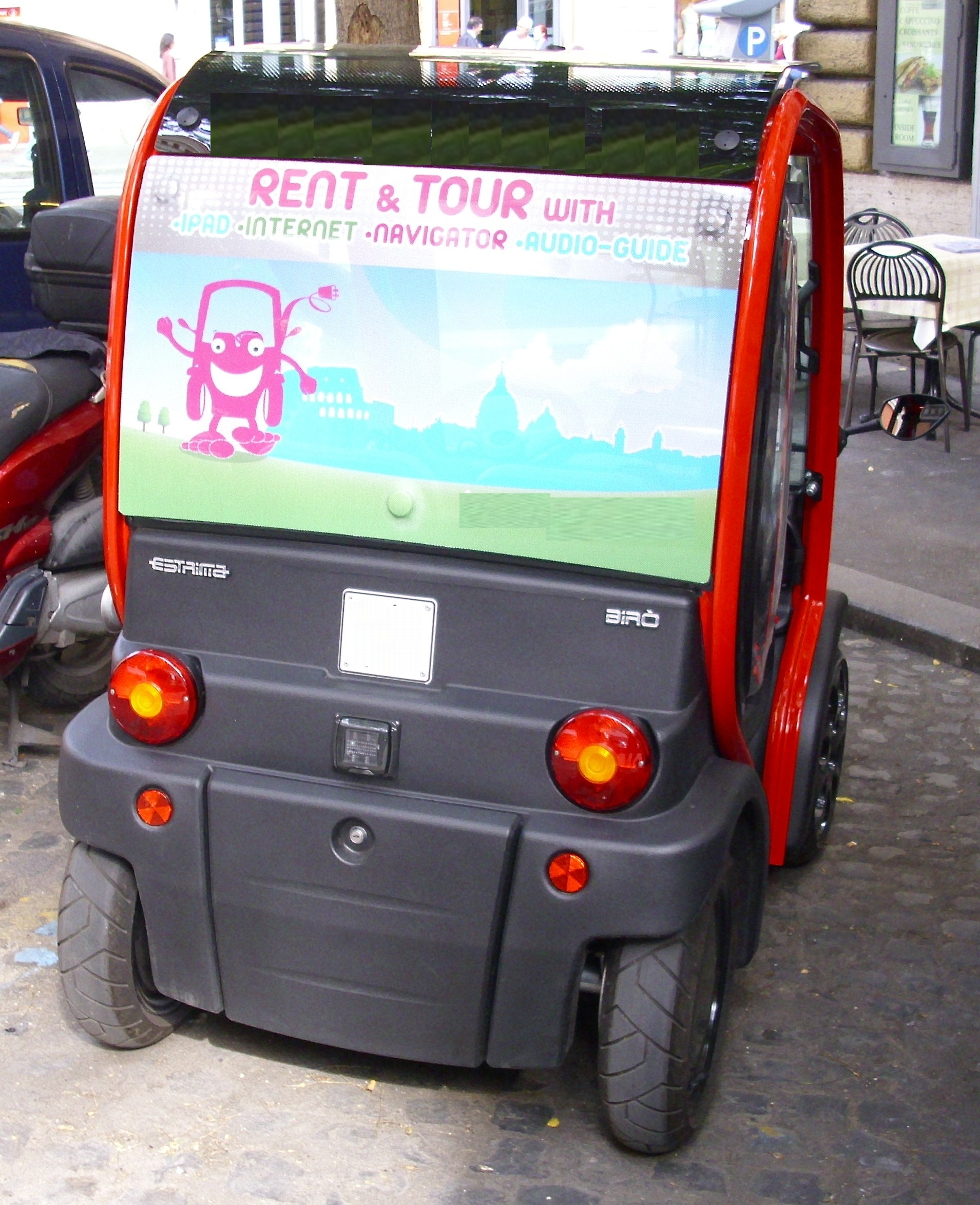

Click on images to enlarge
