= Turkish Islamic Jihad =

The Turkish Islamic Jihad (TIJ) was an Islamic Jihad organization. The group has never publicly given a specific ideology, but their name implies a fundamentalist Islamic orientation. In their only public statement, the group claimed to oppose the efforts of both the United States and Egypt at the Madrid Conference of 1991, whom they accused of attempting to “divide up the Middle East." In 1992 the Turkish Islamic Jihad claimed responsibly for the murder of an Israeli diplomat and the bombing of an Istanbul synagogue. They are also believed to be responsibly for a series of murders against Turkish journalists.

== Background ==
Although they have not claimed an attack since 1996, the Turkish Islamic Jihad was mentioned in the Iranian press as late as 2000 as one of a number of groups continuing to "carry out clandestine political and military activities." The group is thought to be inactive; however the Islamist movement continues to present a threat to Turkey. In Turkey in 1991 a car bomb occurred killing one US Air force sergeant and severely injured an Egyptian diplomat. In Aug. 19, 1991, a British executive with a Turkish-British insurance company was assassinated as he was riding in the Istanbul office elevator. Dev Sol and the Turkish wing of Islamic Jihad both claimed credit.

== See also ==
- Islamist terrorism
- Religious terrorism
- Islamic Jihad Movement in Palestine
