= 1998 Anıtkabir and Fatih Mosque attack attempts =

Attempted terrorist attack in Turkey by the Caliphate State

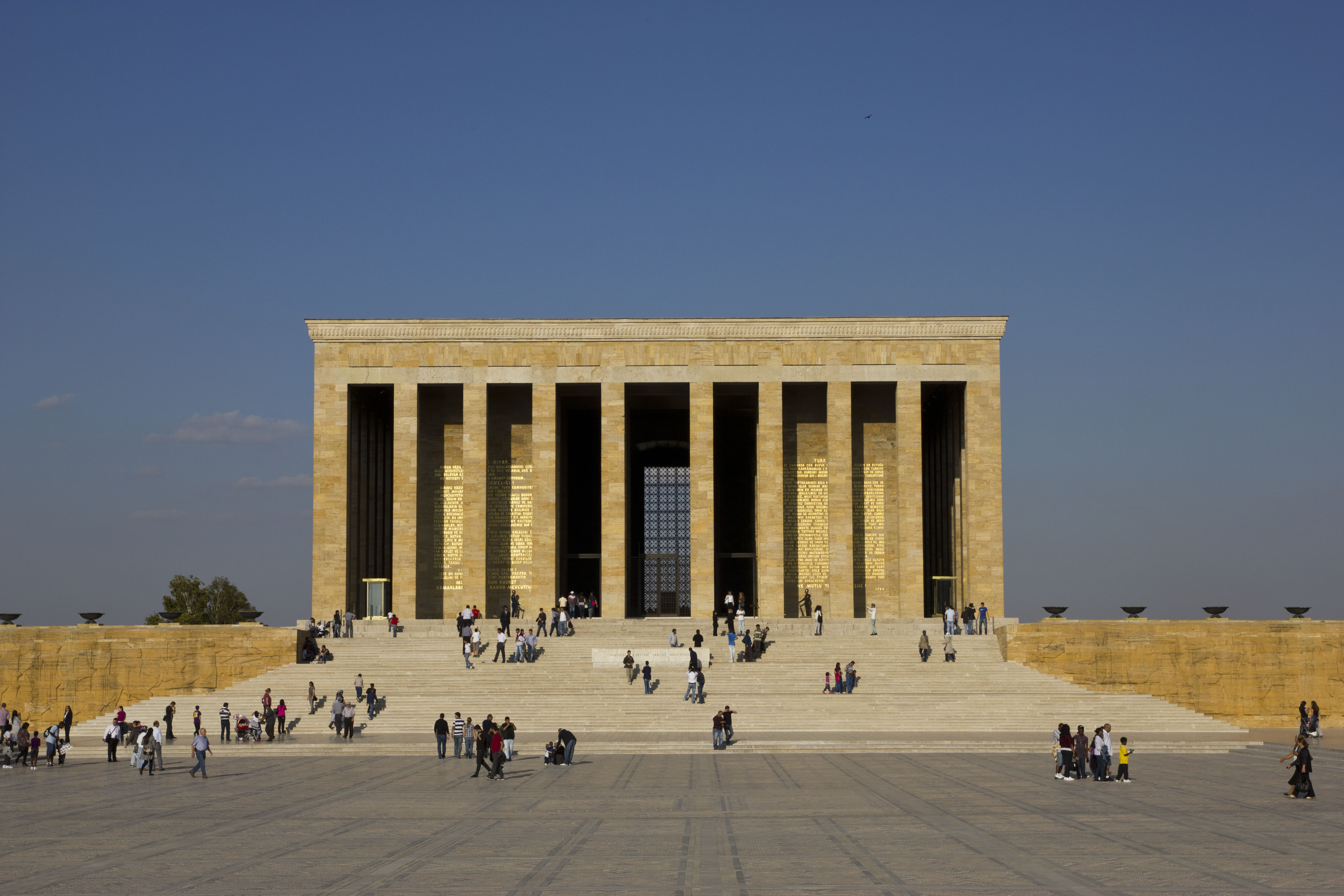
Anıtkabir

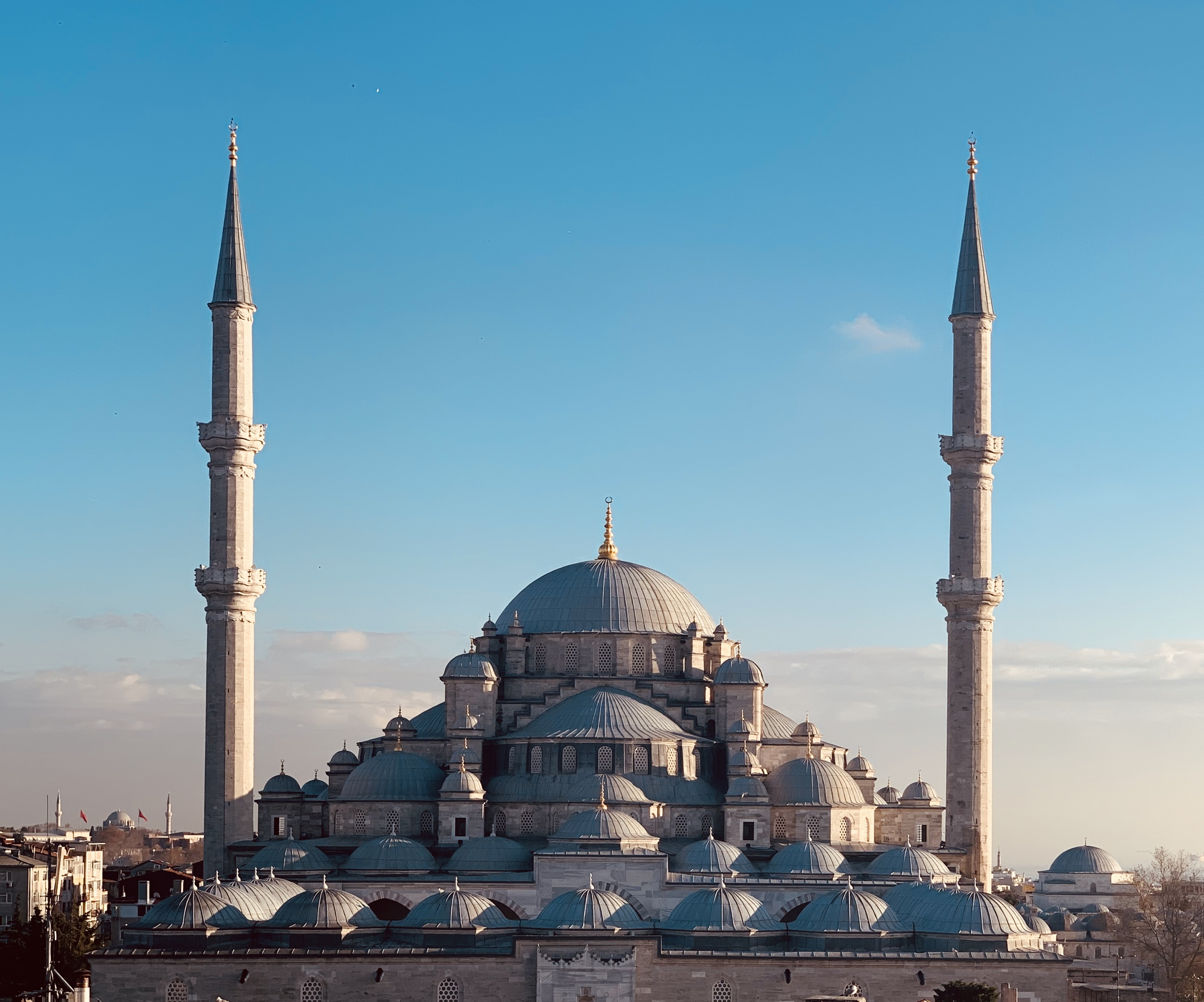
Fatih Mosque

On 29 October 1998, members of the Germany-based Turkish Islamist terrorist group, the "Caliphate State", led by Metin Kaplan, planned to carry out a series of attacks on Anıtkabir in Ankara and the Fatih Mosque in Istanbul during the Republic Day celebrations. On October 28, the Turkish police heard of it and stopped the planned attack before it was carried out. People who were involved with the planned attack were arrested.

== Background ==
At the end of April 1998; various bases used by the Caliphate State, based in Cologne, Germany, were searched by the police. At a meeting held in Cologne on May 3, 1998, which coincided with both Hijri new year and the 5th anniversary of the establishment of the Caliphate State, Metin Kaplan, the leader of the Caliphate State, announced in a Fatwa that "Mustafa Kemal Atatürk and those who obeyed him are not only against the caliph, but against the entire religion, it is permissible to fight against them, and those who die while fighting Atatürk's supporters will be 'shuhada' and will be known as 'ghazi'". In the May 7, 1998 issue of the organization's newspaper "Ummeti Muhammed", the news of this meeting was given with the headline "I hope we are in Hagia Sophia next year". In an official statement of the Caliphate State on September 17, 1998, they said "The CHP, founded by Mustafa Kemal, is the number one enemy of Islam, along with the filthy Republic of Turkey, which is stinking will eventually collapse, the CHP will also be thrown into the garbage of history". The Ummeti Muhammad newspaper on October 15, 1998, stated "Let's protest the 75th anniversary of the Republic, an era of persecution and darkness!". It also said "Those who are willing to die for Islam must emerge, carry out their protests, and at the same time, reveal themselves, and finally their drops of sweat will fall to the ground and green the soil, they will shed the blood drop of martyrdom".

== Attack plan ==
Flag of the Caliphate State

After the Jihad call on May 3, 21 members of the organization left Germany for Turkey and were welcomed by 2 members of the organization there. The group, which reached a total of 23 people, dispersed to Sivas, Konya, Bursa, Istanbul and Sivrihisar under the general leadership of Mehmet Demir, the leader of the organization's Sivas wing. The attackers planned that on October 29, which was Turkish Republic Day, they would occupy Hagia Sophia or Fatih Mosque, and "get martyred" in conflict with the Turkish authorities. The attackers also saw celebrations at Vatan Street, Ali Sami Yen Stadium, and Şükrü Saracoğlu Stadium as possible targets, however later they scratched them out and focused only on Anıtkabir and Fatih Mosque.

15 of these people, who were divided into two groups and acted unaware of each other, came to Istanbul from Sivas on October 28 and rehearsed the action they would carry out at the Fatih Mosque. The first group entered the Fatih Mosque on the morning of October 29 and briefly occupied it, they took down the Flag of Turkey and hung their own flag on the Minaret and Dome of the mosque and declared it as theirs, and they also showed willingness to clash with the Turkish police if they showed up. They also buried some explosives in the garden of the Fatih Mosque, and on the side of the road on Highway 4 in Bolu. The second group planned to carry out a suicide attack on Anıtkabir with the plane they had rented. In the interrogation, which was among those who organized the plane suicide attack, they said that they rented the plane on Bursa on October 23 and made a test flight on October 28, but they could not carry out this attack because the weather conditions were inappropriate that day, and instead they postponed the attack and scheduled it on November 10, the anniversary of Atatürk's death, a day in which Anıtkabir is also full of mourners. They planned to take the plane Sivrihisar and hide it here, and they would attack Anıtkabir the next day with 200 kilograms (around 400 pounds) of explosives they would load on the plane. In the statement made by the company which rented the plane out to the attackers, it was stated that two people they talked to on the phone on October 21 had come to the company's office at the airport one day later and made a one-hour introductory flight with a pilot of the company, and once it was deemed that they had the ability to take care of it, they were allowed to rent it. The company also stated that the same people called again on October 28 to rent another plane, but that request was not fulfilled due to inappropriate weather conditions. It was planned that the explosives placed in the tubes in order to cause more damage would be loaded onto the plane on the hill opposite Sivrihisar Aviation Center and Alibey Farm.

== Investigation, detention and arrests ==
The MİT and Turkish elite units caught a courier who was a member of the organization in Istanbul, and 17 people were later caught and detained on the accusations that they were members of the Caliphate State in the secret operations they organized in Fatih, Gaziosmanpaşa, and Kadıköy in Istanbul on October 28, 1998, in line with the information obtained from the first detained person during the interrogation. As of October 31, the number of people detained increased to 23, and with the hint that some of these people were from Sivas, raids were carried out on their homes in Sivas by the police units, and the tools to be used in these raids and attacks were seized. Among these people were the organization's leaders for Sivas and Ağrı provinces, as well as those responsible for the Frankfurt and Hanover youth recruiting. Istanbul Governor Erol Çakır announced on November 2 that the necessary procedures for the extradition of Metin Kaplan to Turkey have been completed. According to the interrogations made by the detainees, the organization would also attempt to carry out attacks on many entertainment venues where New Year's celebrations were held.

While 4 of the 25 defendants who were referred to the Chief Public Prosecutor's Office of the State Security Court were released, the remaining 21 defendants were arrested on the charge of "being a member of an illegal organization" and sent to Metris Prison after their interrogations at the Istanbul State Security Court No. 2 on Duty, where they were referred on November 5. The next day, while four members of the organization were caught in the operations carried out in Erzurum, an arrest warrant was issued in absentia for Kaplan at the State Security Court on Duty. On November 12, six people who were found to have supplied weapons to those planned to carry out the attack were caught in Erzurum. On November 15; Five people in Altıntepe village of Erzurum and one person in Gelibolu were detained on the grounds that they were hiding members of the organization.

== Reactions ==
Regarding the incident, Istanbul Governor Erol Çakır said, "this is an important event in terms of showing the extent that the betrayal of the homeland, the state, and the republic is planned, the level of disrespect for human life, and the extent to which disrespect for our religion is exhibited." Regarding what happened, Mehmet Nuri Yılmaz, the President of the state-ran Directorate of Religious Affairs, said, "What Metin Kaplan and his men have done is not compatible with Islam. It's just the madness they do". Nahit Menteşe, Vice President of True Path Party, made a false accusation and stated that the Caliphate State acted jointly with the PKK. Police Chief General Necati Bilican cited the purpose of the attacks as wanting to "shake the world" and also wanting to "damage Turkey's image".

Metin Kaplan, who connected to a live broadcast on Show TV on November 4 by phone, said that he did not "send" the attackers, but he also praised them as "ones who sacrifice themselves for Islam", and he also said that Anıtkabir was an idol and he criticized the Anıtkabir visitors as pagans and polytheists. In his statement published in Milliyet on November 23, Kaplan described these attack attempts as "a legitimate human right to protest against the Republic of Turkey", although he claimed that he did not give the order for these attacks himself.
