= Turks in the Netherlands =

Ethnic group

Hollanda'daki Türkler; Turken in Nederland

Total population
- 468,726 or 2.6% (2025)

Regions with significant populations
- Rotterdam; Amsterdam; The Hague; Utrecht; Deventer

Languages
- Turkish; Kurmanji; Dutch; Dutch dialects

Religion
- Predominantly Sunni Islam; Minority Alevism, Christianity, other religions and irreligion
- a: Data from Statistics Netherlands shows that there are 410,000 people with a migration background from Turkey, regardless of ethnicity (first and second-generation only).

Turks in the Netherlands (Dutch: Turken in Nederland; Turkish: Hollanda'daki Türkler), also Dutch Turks (Nederlandse Turken) or Turkish Dutch (Turkse Nederlanders; Hollanda Türkleri), refers to people of full or partial Turkish ethnicity living in the Netherlands. The Turks are the third-largest ethnic group in the Netherlands after the ethnic Dutch and Frisians. The majority of Dutch Turks descend from the Republic of Turkey; however, there has also been significant Turkish migration waves from other post-Ottoman countries including ethnic Turkish communities which have come to the Netherlands from the Balkans (e.g. from Bulgaria, Greece, Kosovo, North Macedonia and Romania), the island of Cyprus, as well as from other parts of the Levant (especially Iraq). More recently, during the European migrant crisis, significant waves of Turkish minorities from Syria and Kosovo have also arrived in the Netherlands. In addition, there has been migration to the Netherlands from the Turkish diaspora; many Turkish-Belgians and Turkish-Germans have arrived in the country as Belgian and German citizens.

As of 2025, there were 468,726 Turks in the Netherlands, or 2.6% of the population.

== History ==
There have been various Turkish migration waves to the Netherlands from all modern nation-states which were once part of the Ottoman Empire and which still consist of ethnic Turkish communities. The majority of Dutch-Turks have immigrated from (or descend from) the Republic of Turkey. However, there are also significant ethnic Turkish communities which have come to the Netherlands from the Balkans (especially from Bulgaria, Greece, and North Macedonia), Cyprus, the Levant (especially from Iraq), and North Africa. Due to the European migrant crisis a substantial number of ethnic Turks have also arrived from Syria and Kosovo. Moreover, many Turkish-Belgians and Turkish-Germans in the diaspora have also come to the Netherlands as Belgian and German citizens.

=== Turkish migration from the Ottoman Empire ===
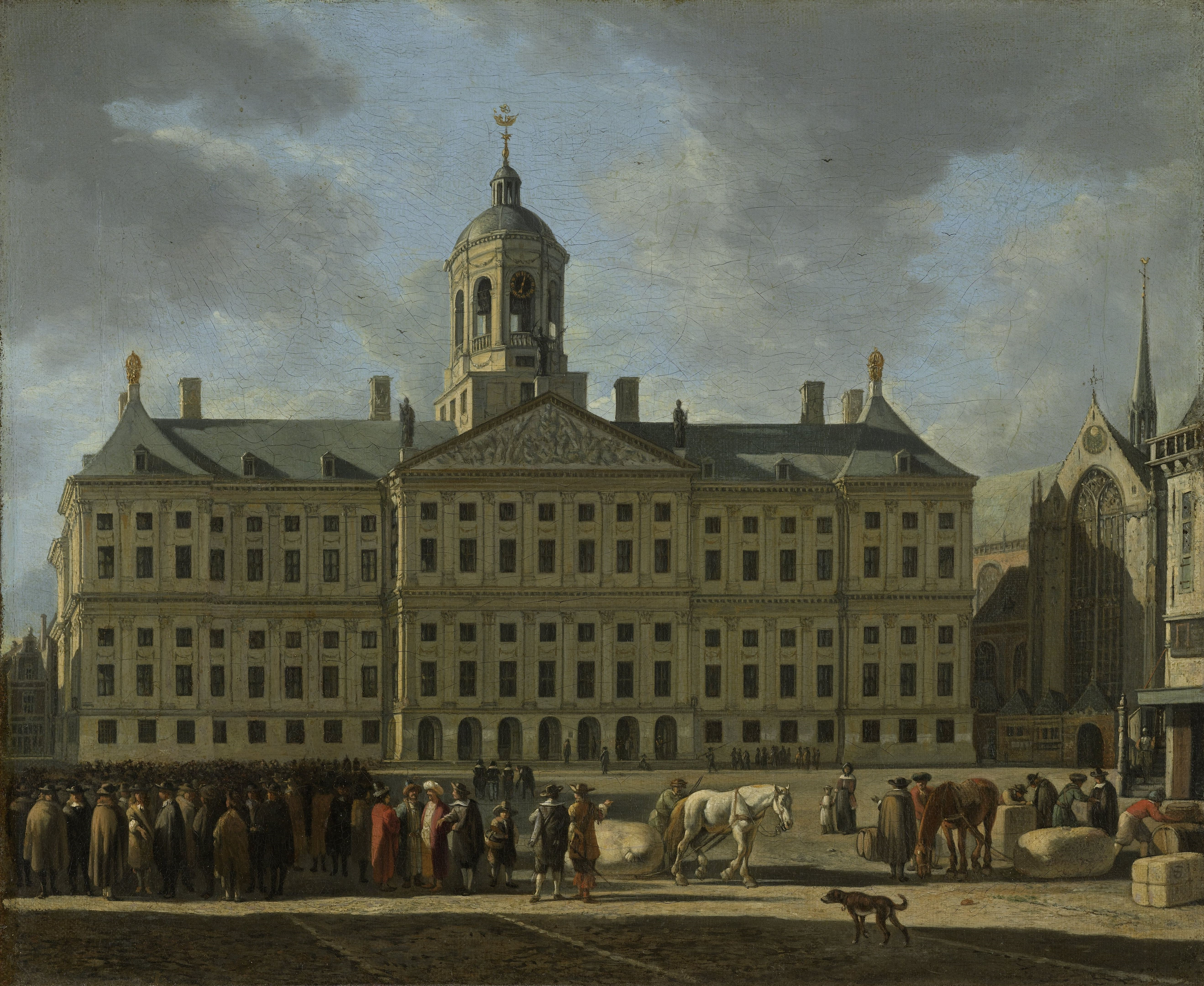
Gerrit Berckheyde's 1672 painting, The Town Hall on Dam Square, depicting a Turk in the foreground with two Jewish men and a Dutchman at the Royal Palace of Amsterdam

The first Turkish settlers in the Netherlands dates back to the 16th century, when Ottoman Turkish traders settled in many Dutch and Flemish trading towns. The English traveller Andrew Marvell referred to the Netherlands as "the place for Turk, Christian, heathen, Jew; staple place for sects and schisms" due to the religious freedom and the large number of different religious groups there. References to the Ottoman state and Islamic symbolism were also frequently used within 16th century Dutch society itself, most notably in Protestant speeches called hagenpreken, and in the crescent-shaped medals of the Geuzen, bearing the inscription "Rather Turkish than Papists". When Dutch forces broke through the Spanish siege of Leiden in 1574, they carried with them Turkish flags into the city. During the Siege of Sluis in Zeeland in 1604, 1,400 Turkish slaves were freed by Maurice of Orange from captivity by the Spanish army. The Turks were declared free people and the Dutch state paid for their repatriation. To honour the resistance of the Turkish slaves, Prince Maurice named a local embankment "Turkeye". The Ottoman victory against the Spanish in the battle of Goleta Conquest of Tunis (1574) managed in reducing Spanish pressure on the Dutch, and leading to negotiations at the Conference of Breda.

Diplomat Cornelius Haga gained trading privileges from Constantinople for the Dutch Republic in 1612, some 40 years before any other nation recognized Dutch independence. Two years later the Ottomans sent their emissary Ömer Aga to the Netherlands to intensify the relations between the two states.

=== Turkish migration from the Republic of Turkey ===
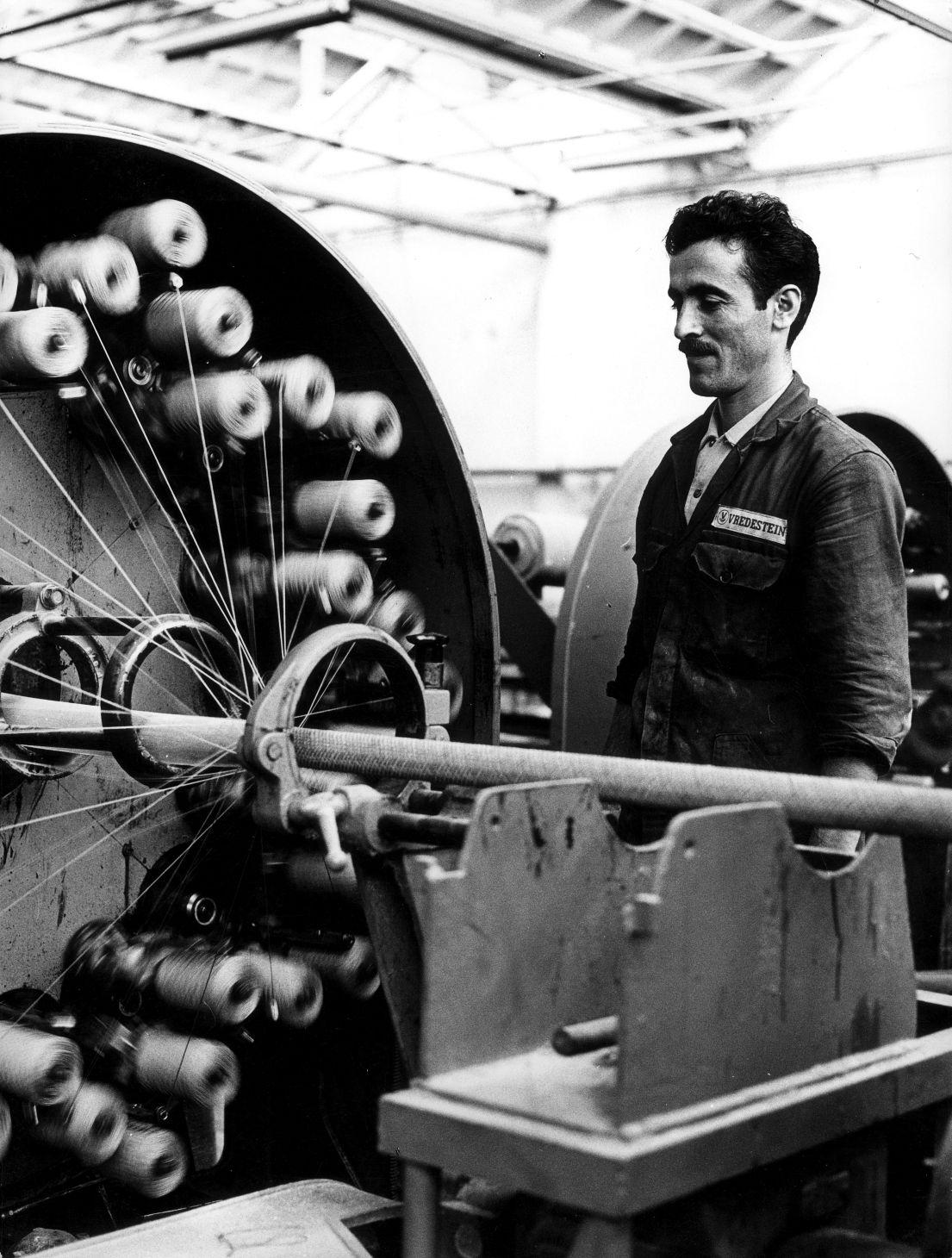
A Turkish gastarbeider at work behind a machine in the Vredestein tyre factory in Loosduinen, 1971

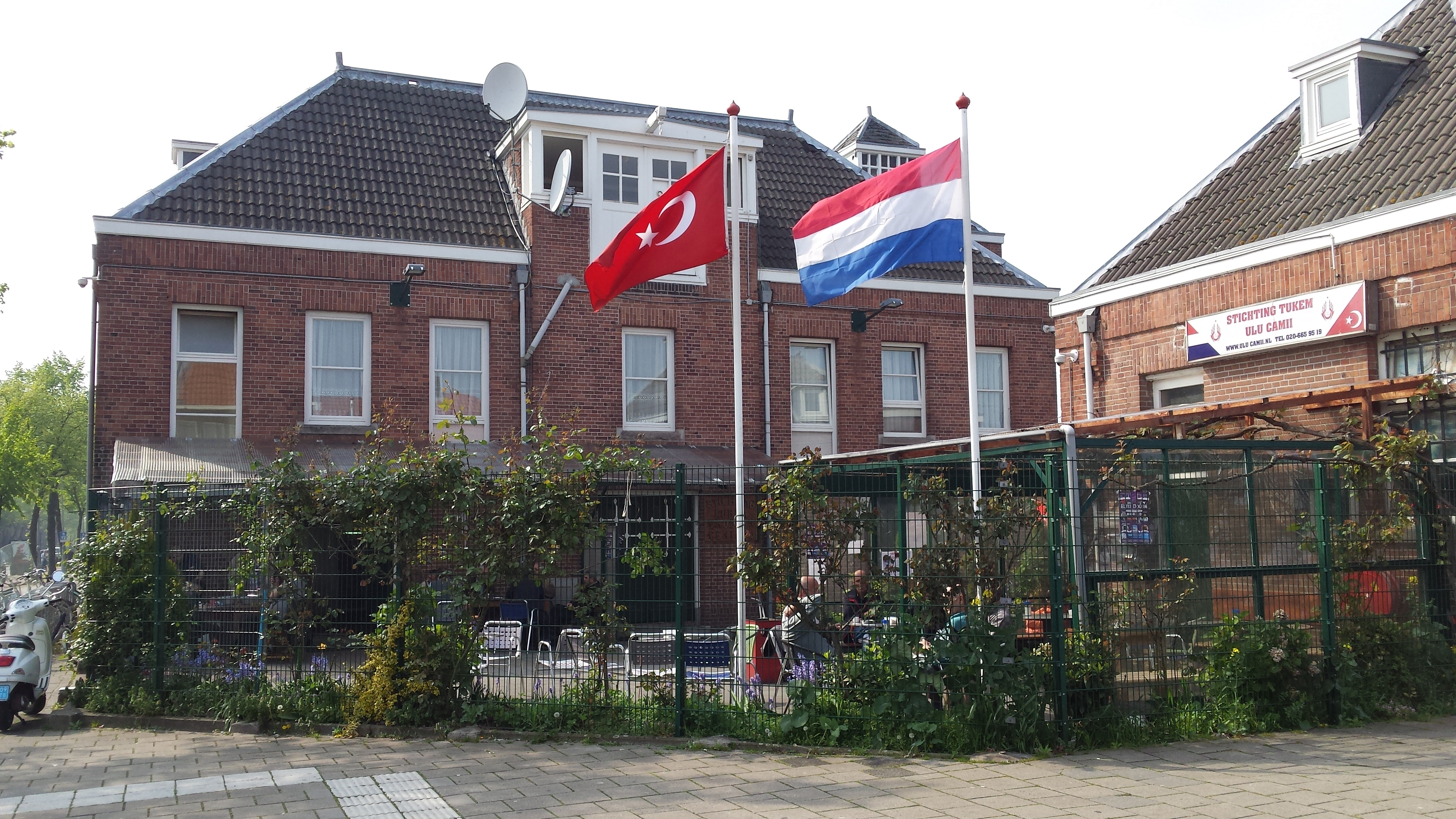
A Turkish Foundation in Amsterdam-Oost, 2014

During the 1950s, successive Dutch governments strongly stimulated emigration from the Netherlands, while at the same time the economy grew rapidly. The Netherlands began to face a labour shortage by the mid-1950s already, which became more serious during the early 1960s, as the country experienced even higher economic growth rates, comparable to the rest of Europe. At the same time, Turkey had a problem of unemployment, low GNP levels and a high population growth. So the import of labour solved problems on both ends. The first Turkish immigrants arrived in the Netherlands in the beginning of the 1960s at a time when the Dutch economy was wrestling with a shortage of workers. On 19 August 1964, the Dutch government entered into a 'recruitment agreement' with Turkey. Thereafter, the number of Turkish workers in the Netherlands increased rapidly. These were housed in residential complexes, such as Atatürk in Amsterdam-Noord.

There were two distinct periods of recruitment. During the first period, which lasted until 1966, a large number of Turks came to the Netherlands through unofficial channels, either being recruited by employers or immigrating spontaneously. A small economic recession began in 1966. Some of the labour migrants were forced to return to Turkey. In 1968, the economy picked up again and a new recruitment period, which was to last until 1974, commenced. In May 1968, new European Economic Community rules forced the Netherlands to instate a travel visa system to regulate labour immigration and from then on, the state recruited foreign workers. The peak of Turkish labour migration occurred during these years. The Turks eventually surpassed other migrant nationalities in numbers and came to represent the Dutch image of guest workers.

Most Turks came to the Netherlands in order to work and save enough money to build a house, expand the family business or start their own business in Turkey. Thus, the decision to emigrate was made primarily for economic reasons. Most of the labour migrants did not come from the lowest strata of the Turkish population, nor did emigration begin in the least developed parts of Turkey, but in the big cities such as Istanbul, Ankara and İzmir. Only later did less urbanised areas become involved with the immigration process. Ultimately, the largest numbers of Turks did come from these areas. Most Turks in the Netherlands come from villages and provincial cities in the middle of the country and on the coast of the Black Sea.

At the end of 1973, the labour recruitment was nearly brought to a halt, and the Turks were no longer admitted to the Netherlands as labour migrants. Turkish immigration, however, continued practically unabatedly through the process of family reunification. Even more Turkish men began to bring their families to the Netherlands in the 1970s. In the first half of the 1980s, the Turkish net immigration began to decrease, but, in 1985, it began to rise again. Most of them had a bride or bridegroom come over from their native land. Marriage immigration continued into the early twenty-first century, though net immigration again decreased in the 1990s. In 2004, stricter laws largely ended marriage immigration, causing in some years net emigration. After 2016, political persecution lead to an influx of Turkish asylum seekers.

=== Turkish migration from the Balkans ===
==== Bulgaria ====
In 2009 The Sofia Echo reported that Turkish Bulgarians were now the fastest-growing group of immigrants in the Netherlands. At the time, they numbered between 10,000 and 30,000. Similarly, De Telegraaf and De Pers have also reported that the Turkish Bulgarians were the fast-growing group of migrants; furthermore, the Turkish Bulgarians formed 90% of Bulgarian citizens arriving in the Netherlands. The majority, of about 80%, have come from the south-eastern Bulgarian district of Kardzhali (Kırcaali) which has a Turkish majority population.

Although Bulgaria joined the European Union during the 2007 enlargement, the rights of Bulgarian citizens to work freely as EU nationals in the Netherlands came into full effect on 1 January 2014. Consequently, there were strong indications that the migration of Turkish Bulgarians to the Netherlands (as well as other parts of Europe) would continue.

Indeed, a 2015 study by Mérove Gijsberts and Marcel Lubbers found that Turkish Bulgarians were more likely to stay in the Netherlands than ethnic Bulgarians; it also found that Turkish Bulgarians were much more satisfied with their lives in the Netherlands than the ethnic Bulgarians.

==== Greece ====
Members of the Turkish minority of Western Thrace in Greece began to migrate to the Netherlands in the 1960s, increasing further in the 1970s. Initially, these early migrants intended to return to Greece after working for a number of years in the Netherlands; however, the Greek government used Article 19 of the 1955 Greek Constitution to strip some members of the Turkish minority living abroad of their Greek citizenship. Consequently, many ethnic Turks were forced to remain in the Western European countries they had settled in, which, in turn, also established the permanent Turkish Western Thracian community in the Netherlands. By 1983, the Western Thrace Turks founded their first organisation, the Alblasserdam Batı Trakya Türkleri Cemiyeti ("Alblasserdam Western Thrace Turks Association"), in the town of Alblasserdam.

More recently, the community has increased significantly due to the large numbers of new arrivals since the twenty-first century. For many, the Greek government-debt crisis in 2007-08 was a big factor in seeking better economic opportunities in the Netherlands. In 2009 the Western Thrace Turks established the Hollanda Batı Trakya Türk Kültür ve Dayanışma Derneği ("Western Thrace Turks Culture and Solidarity Association of the Netherlands") which consists of cognates residing in different regions of the Netherlands. By 2017, the Hollanda Lahey Batı Trakya Türk Birlik ve Beraberlik Derneği ("Hague Western Thrace Turks Unity Association of the Netherlands") was established by the community living in The Hague. Many have settled in the Randstad region. After Germany, the Netherlands is the most popular destination for Turkish immigrants from Western Thrace.

Between 1970 and 2018, approximately 100,000 Western Thrace Turks have immigrated to Germany, the Netherlands and the United Kingdom.

==== North Macedonia ====
Some members of the Turkish Macedonian minority have emigrated to the Netherlands for better economic opportunities.

==== Romania ====
Since the first decade of the twenty-first century, there has been a significant decrease in the population of the Turkish Romanian minority group due to the admission of Romania into the European Union and the subsequent relaxation of the travelling and migration regulations. Thus, Turkish Romanians, especially from the Dobruja region, have joined other Romanian citizens in migrating mostly to Western European countries, including the Netherlands.

=== Turkish migration from the Levant ===
==== Cyprus ====
The majority of the Turkish Cypriots left the island of Cyprus due to economic and political reasons in the 20th century. Traditionally, most who migrated to Western Europe settled in the United Kingdom, Germany, France and Austria; however, since the 1990s, the Netherlands began to attract the bulk of Turkish Cypriot migrants.

==== Iraq ====
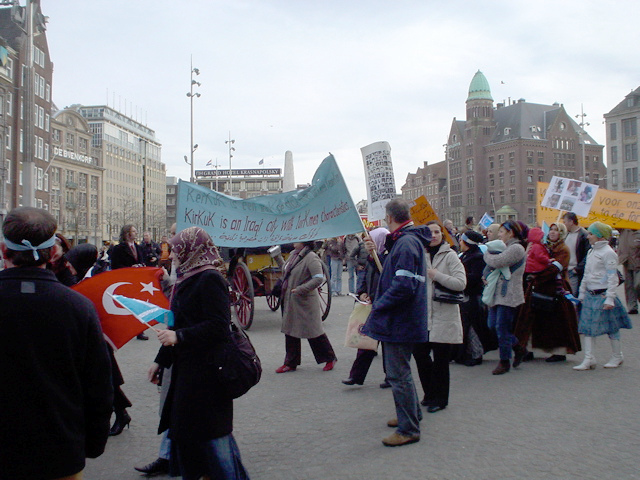
Iraqi Turks on Dam Square protest the planned Kirkuk status referendum, 2007

Significant migration waves from the Turkish Iraqi community to the Netherlands occurred during the Iran–Iraq War (1980–88), the Gulf War (1991), and the Iraq War (2003–11). According to Professor Suphi Saatçi, in 2010 the Iraqi Turks in the Netherlands numbered around 4,000. Iraqi Turks have continued to migrate to the Netherlands during the European migrant crisis (2014–19).

==== Syria ====
Due to the Syrian civil war, many Syrian Turks were forced to initially take refuge in Turkey; from there, many continued Westwards, especially during the European migrant crisis (2014–19). The majority of Turkish Syrian refugees arrived in the Netherlands via the highway through Macedonia, Serbia, Croatia, Austria and Germany.

=== Turkish migration from the modern diaspora ===
In addition to ethnic Turkish people that have migrated to the Netherlands from traditional areas of settlement in post-Ottoman modern nation-states, there has also been an increasing migration to the Netherlands from other countries in the modern Turkish diaspora. For example, members of the Turkish German and Turkish Belgian communities have also settled in the Netherlands. Most have emigrated using their EU citizenship rights (i.e. the freedom of movement) as German or Belgian nationals.

== Demographics ==
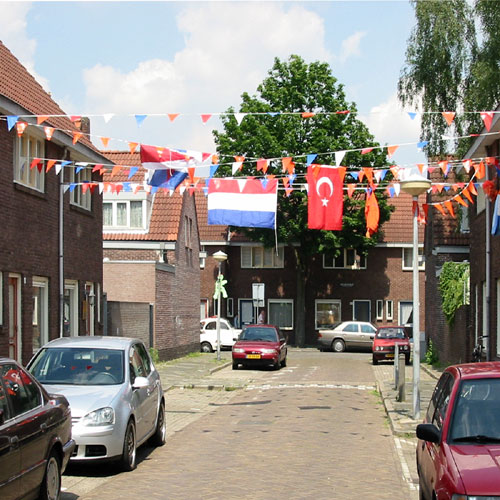
Flags of the Netherlands and Turkey hang side-by-side in Stratum, Eindhoven, during the 2008 UEFA European Football Championship

Turkish immigrants first began to settle in big cities in the Netherlands such as Amsterdam, Rotterdam, The Hague and Utrecht as well as the regions of Twente and Limburg, where there was a growing demand for industrial labour. However, not only the large cities but also medium-sized cities, and even small villages attracted the Turks.

The Turkish population is mostly concentrated in large cities in the west of the country; some 36% of Turks live in the Randstad region. The second most common settlements are in the south, in the Limburg region, in Eindhoven and Tilburg, and in the east: Turks comprise over 5% of Arnhem's population as of 2020.

Additionally, Turks comprise over 7% of the population in Deventer, as well as in Enschede. Turks comprise over 8% of the population in Almelo in the Twente region as of 2020.

Number of Turks in larger cities
| # | City | People |
| 1. | Rotterdam | 47,602 |
| 2. | Amsterdam | 44,527 |
| 3. | The Hague | 42,138 |
| 4. | Utrecht | 14,376 |
| 5. | Zaanstad | 13,128 |
| 6. | Eindhoven | 11,919 |
| 7. | Enschede | 8,712 |
| 8. | Arnhem | 8,621 |
| 9. | Tilburg | 8,431 |
| 10. | Schiedam | 8,137 |

=== Characteristics ===
Official data published by Statistics Netherlands only collects data on the country of birth and does not provide data on ethnicity. Consequently, the 410,000 people recorded from Turkey (first and second-generation only) in 2019 is problematic as a reflection of the total ethnic Turkish population. Firstly, ethnic Turks which have arrived in the Netherlands from the Balkans, Cyprus, the Levant, North Africa, and the diaspora (e.g Belgium and Germany) are recorded according to their citizenship, such as "Belgian", "Bulgarian", "Cypriot", "German", "Greek", "Iraqi", "Lebanese" "Macedonian", "Syrian" etc. rather than by their ethnicity. Although these ethnic Turkish communities have different nationalities, they might share the same ethnic, linguistic, cultural and religious origins as mainland ethnic Turks. Secondly, Statistic Netherlands does not provide any data on Dutch-born citizens of ethnic Turkish origin who are from the third generation, but the total non-western third generation is indicated as small in absolute numbers.

The percentage of first and second generation Turks marrying a bride or groom from Dutch descent has been stable at around 5-10% from 2001 to 2015.

=== Population estimates ===
The estimates on the Turkish-Dutch community have varied. Suzanne Aalberse et al. have said that, despite the official Dutch statistics, "over the years" the Turkish community "must have numbered half a million". Sometimes sources casually mention much higher estimates, equalling the official total number of non-western immigrants and their descendants.

Amount of 1st and 2nd generation Turks in the Netherlands CBS
| Year | Total | Year | Total |
|---|---|---|---|
| 1996 | 271.514 | 2010 | 383.957 |
| 1997 | 279.708 | 2011 | 388.967 |
| 1998 | 289.777 | 2012 | 392.923 |
| 1999 | 299.662 | 2013 | 395.302 |
| 2000 | 308.890 | 2014 | 396.414 |
| 2001 | 319.600 | 2015 | 396.555 |
| 2002 | 330.709 | 2016 | 397.471 |
| 2003 | 341.400 | 2017 | 400.367 |
| 2004 | 351.648 | 2018 | 404.459 |
| 2005 | 358.846 | 2019 | 409.877 |
| 2006 | 364.333 | 2020 | 416.864 |
| 2007 | 368.600 | 2021 | 422.030 |
| 2008 | 372.714 | 2022 | 429.978 |
| 2009 | 378.330 | 2025 | 468,726 |

The total amount of first and second generation Turks increased from 271.514 in 1996 to 429.978 in 2022.

As of 2025, there were 468,726 Turks in the Netherlands, or 2.6% of the population.

=== Emigration ===
According to a study by Petra Wieke de Jong, focusing on second-generation Turkish-Dutch people who were specifically born in the years 1983 to 1992 only, there was 6,914 people from this age group and generation who left the Netherlands and emigrated to other countries as Dutch citizens between the years 2001 and 2017. Of those who reported their destination, the most popular country was to Turkey (37.78%), followed by Belgium (17.47%), Germany (11.64%) and the United Kingdom (1.48%). In addition, some of these emigrants reported moving to other EU countries (3.43%) or to outside the EU (2.7%). However, a large portion of these Turkish-Dutch emigrants, totaling 1,761 (i.e. 25.47%), did not report their destination of emigration.

== Culture ==
=== Language ===
The first generation of Turkish immigrants is predominantly Turkish-speaking and has only limited Dutch competence. Thus, for immigrant children, their early language input is Turkish, but the Dutch language quickly enters their lives via playmates and day-care centres. By age six, these children are often bilinguals.

Adolescents have developed a code-switching mode which is reserved for in-group use. With older members of the Turkish community and with strangers, Turkish is used, and if Dutch speakers enter the scene, a switch to Dutch is made. The young bilinguals, therefore, speak normal Turkish with their elders, and a kind of Dutch-Turkish with each other.

=== Religion ===
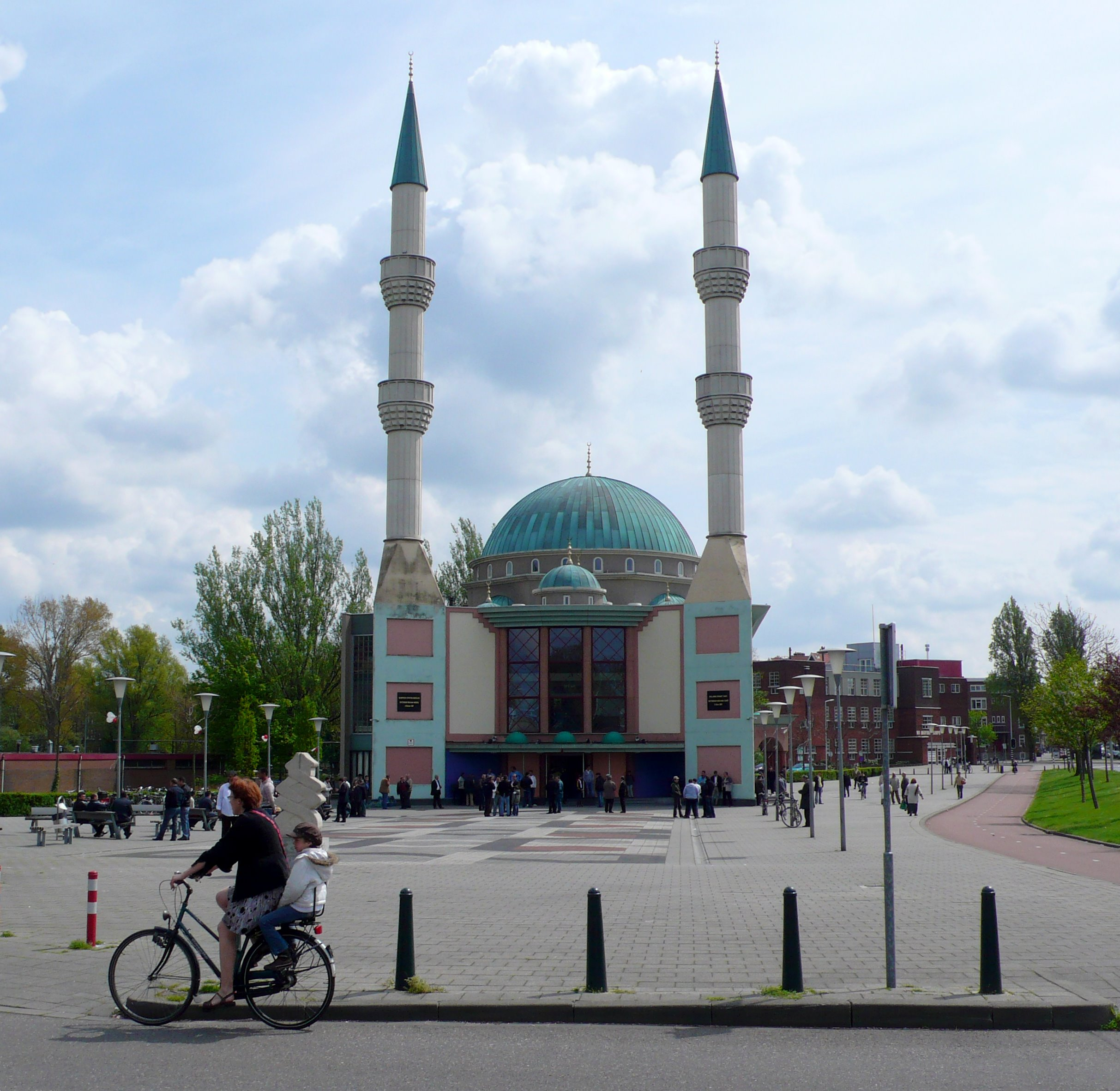
The Turkish Mevlana Mosque in Rotterdam was voted the most attractive building in 2006

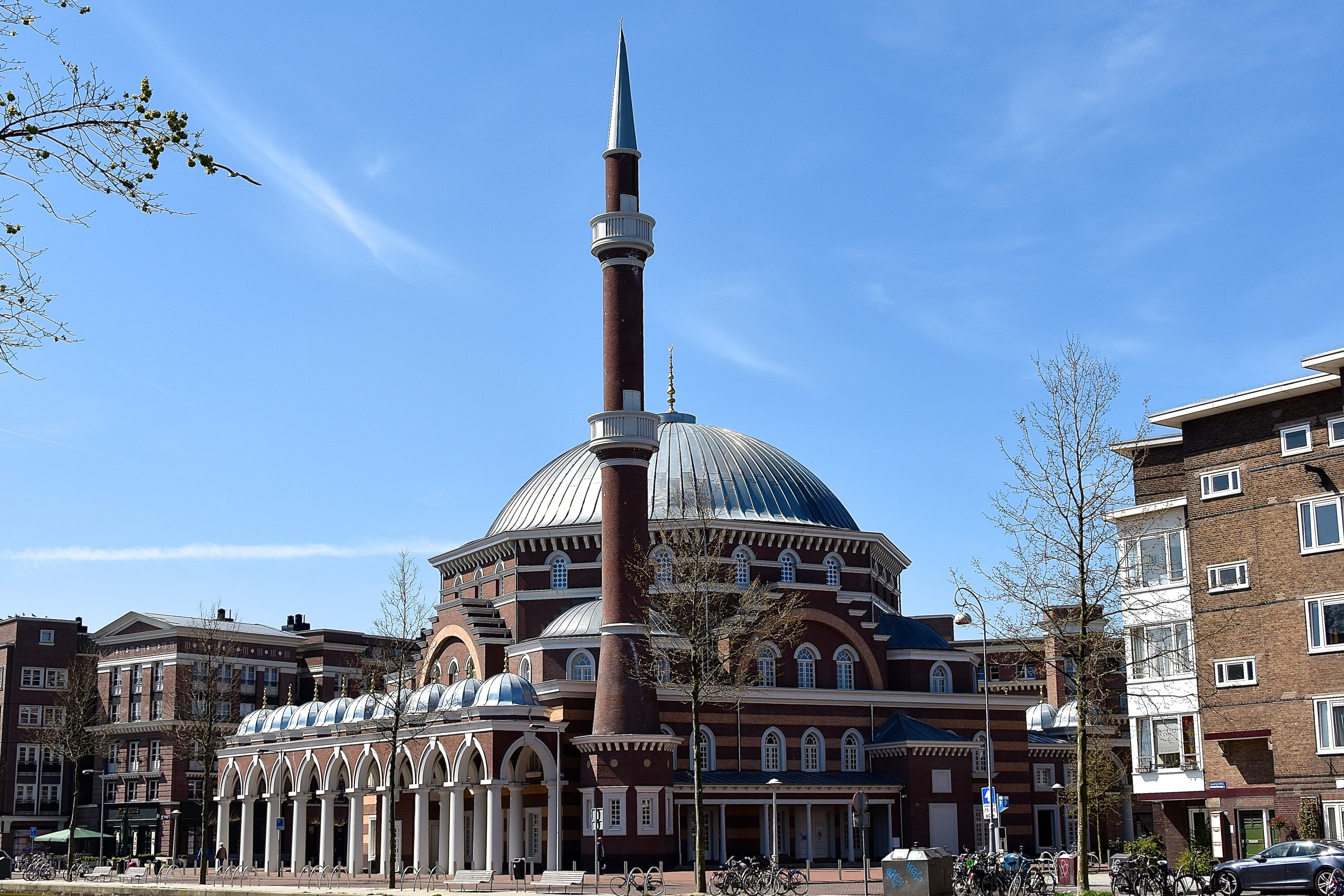
The Turkish Westermoskee (Ayasofya Camii) in Amsterdam-West is the largest mosque in the Netherlands

When family reunification resulted in the establishment of Turkish communities, the preservation of Turkish culture became a more serious matter. Most Turks consider Islam to be the centre of their culture. Thus, the majority of Dutch Turks adheres to Sunni Islam, although there is also a considerable Alevi fragment. According to the latest figures issued by Statistics Netherlands, approximately five percent of the Dutch population (850,000 persons), were followers of Islam in 2006. Furthermore, eighty-seven percent of Turks were followers of Islam. The Turkish community accounted for almost forty percent of the Muslim population; thus are the largest ethnic group in the Netherlands adhering to Islam.

Turks are considered to be the most organised ethnic group with its activities and organisations. The Turkish Islamic Cultural Federation (TICF) which was founded in 1979, had seventy-eight member associations by the early 1980s, and continued to grow to reach 140 by the end of the 1990s. It works closely with the Turkish-Islamic Union for Religious Affairs (Diyanet), which provides the TICF with the imams which it employs in its member mosques.

The Turkish Directorate of Religious Affairs (Diyanet) established a branch in the Netherlands in 1982 with the intent to oppose the influence of leftist asylum seekers from Turkey as well as rightist members of Islamist movements such as Millî Görüş. In 1983, the Netherlands agreed to allowing Turkey to send its own imams to the Turkish guest worker communities. Critics of this agreement argue that these imams, some of whom do not speak Dutch, hinder the effective integration of Dutch-Turkish Muslims into the society of the Netherlands by promoting allegiance to the Turkish state while neglecting to promote loyalty to the Dutch state.

Of the 475 mosques in the Netherlands in 2018, a plurality (146) are controlled by the Turkish Directorate of Religious Affairs (Diyanet). Diyanet implements the political ideology of the Islamist Turkish AKP party. Diyanet mosques, have stayed out of initiatives to train imams in the Netherlands which were designed to train Islamic preachers who were familiar with the European context and to promote Dutch values and norms. This resistance is based on that it would be more difficult to import Diyanet imams, who are employees of the Turkish state, from Turkey if they cooperated in Dutch imam training programs. Diyanet imams receive benefits and political tasks which are comparable to those of Turkish diplomats.

In April 2006, the Turkish Mevlana Mosque had been voted the most attractive building in Rotterdam in a public survey organised by the City Information Centre. It had beaten the Erasmus Bridge due to the mosques 'symbol of warmth and hospitality'.

== Politics ==
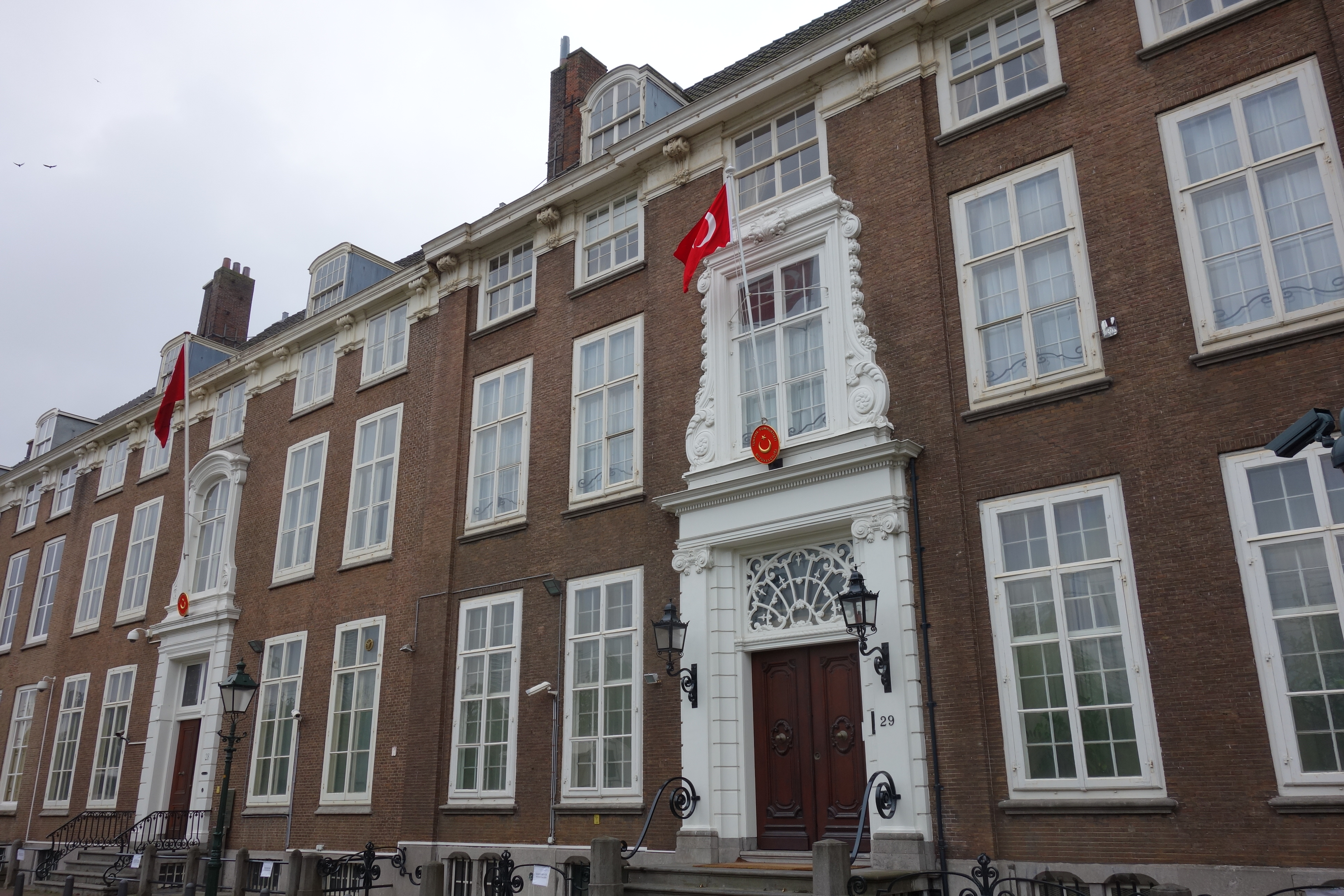
Embassy of the Republic of Turkey in The Hague, 2015

Dutch Turks generally support left-wing political parties (DENK, PvdA, D66, GroenLinks, and SP) over the right-wing ones (CDA, VVD and SGP). In the past, migrants were not as eager to vote. However, they are now aware that they can become a decisive factor in the Dutch political system. Far-right groups have taunted the Dutch Labour Party, the PvdA, for becoming the Party of the Allochthonous because of the votes they receive from migrants and the increase in the number of elected ethnic Turkish candidates. Turkish votes determine about two seats of the 150 representatives in the Second Chamber of the Staten-Generaal. During the Dutch general election (2002), there were fourteen candidates of Turkish origin spread out over six-party lists which encouraged fifty-five percent of Turks to vote, which was a much higher turnout than any other ethnic minorities.

=== Political parties founded by Dutch Turks ===
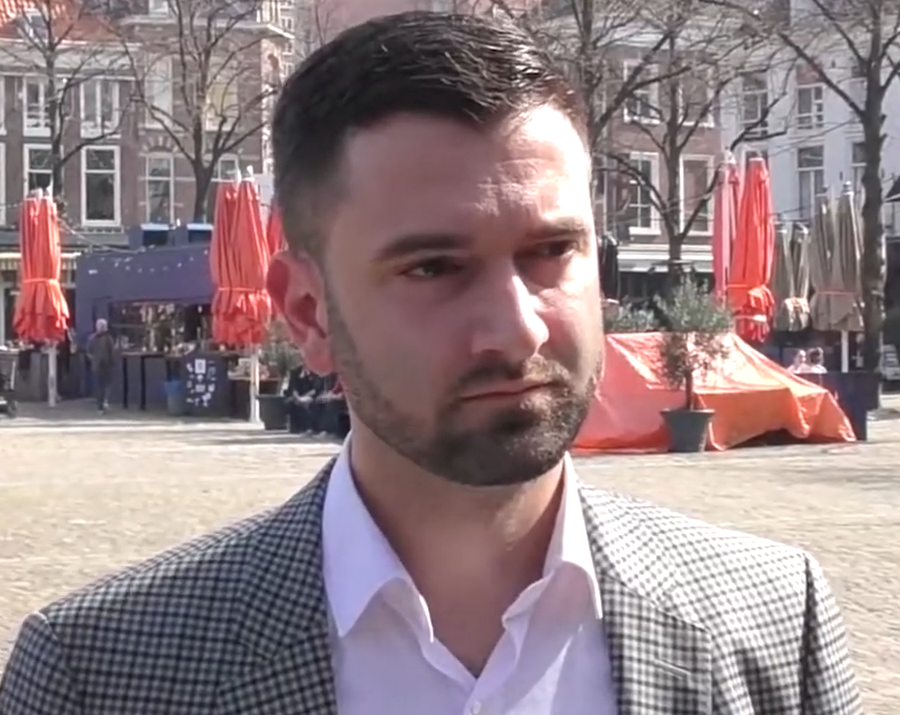
Born to a Turkish father and a Dutch mother, Stephan van Baarle is the leader of the Turkish Dutch-founded Denk party and an elected member of the House of Representatives

In February, 2015, Turkish-born Dutch parliamentarians, Tunahan Kuzu and Selçuk Öztürk, established the political party Denk (which in Dutch means "think" and in Turkish means "equal" or "balanced"). In its manifesto, Denk was established to combat their perceived rising intolerance, right-wing thinking, and xenophobia in the Netherlands. The party carries the program advanced by the International Institute for Scientific Research, based in the Hague, with the purpose of decolonization. Consequently, the party has been in direct response to the "nativist and isolationalist positions promoted by Geert Wilders" and his populist right Freedom Party. Among its policies, Denk seeks to: establish a "racism register" to track and condemn the use of hate speech against religion; build a Dutch slavery museum; abolish the black minstrel character Zwarte Piet ("Black Pete"); and ban the use of the derogatory Dutch word "Allochtoon". Although the party has been popularly described as a "Muslim political party", Denk "does not promote Muslim canadidates as do most similar political parties in Europe". In the 2017 elections, votes for Denk exceeded those of the PVdA and Wilders's PVV in Rotterdam and The Hague; moreover, Denk also exceeded the PVV's votes in Amsterdam. The party won three seats at the 2017 election; thus, Denk is the first migrant-founded party to gain seats in the Dutch national parliament. In the 2021 elections the party stayed at 3 seats.

== Literature ==
A number of Turkish-Dutch writers have come to prominence. Halil Gür was one of the earliest, writing short stories about Turkish immigrants. Sadik Yemni is well known for his Turkish-Dutch detective stories. Sevtap Baycili is a more intellectual novelist, who is not limited to migrant themes.

== Anti-Turkish sentiment ==
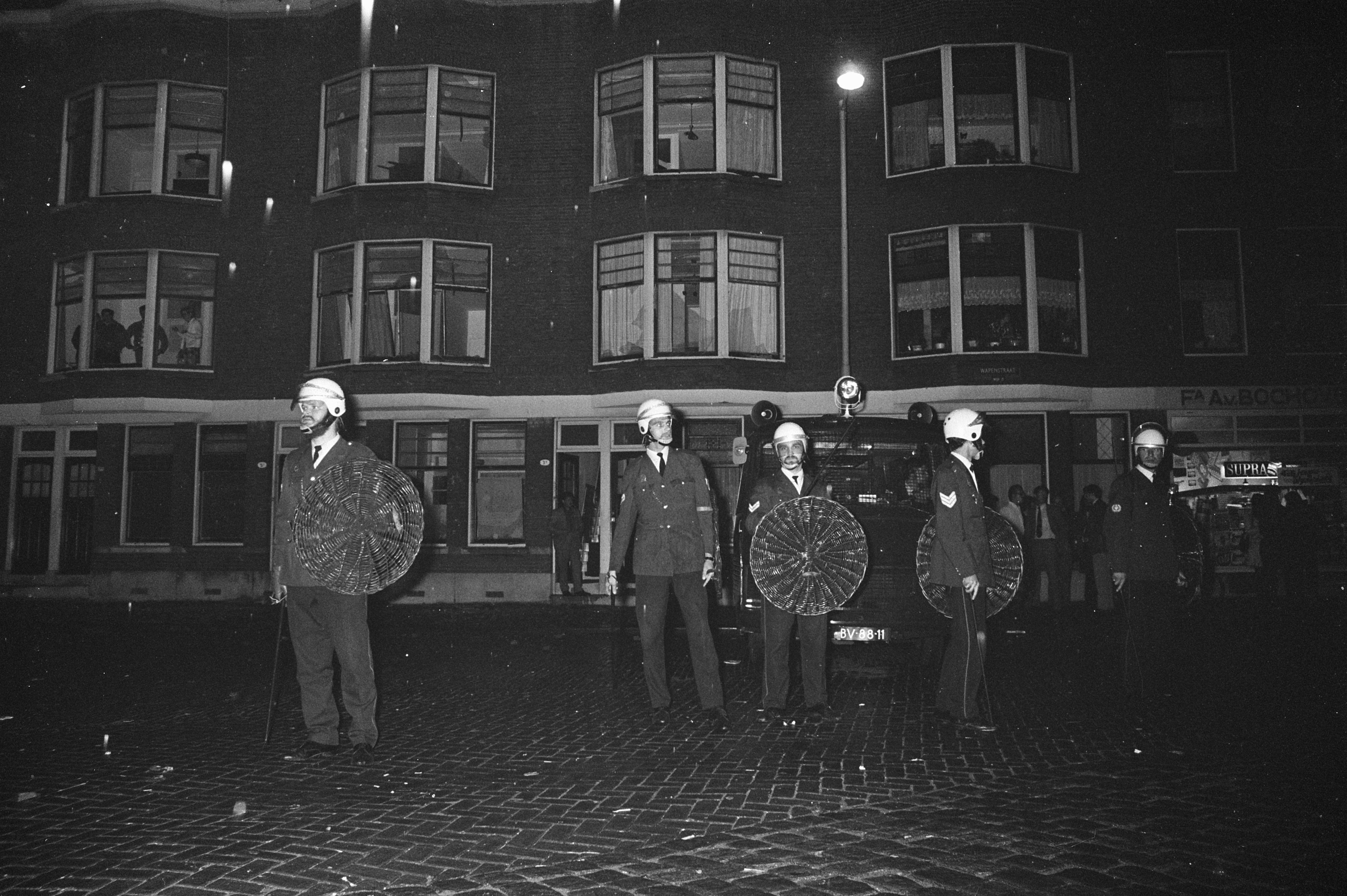
Dutch police guard Turkish residences during the 1972 riots in the Afrikaanderwijk, Rotterdam

Although progressive policies are in place, "especially compared with those in some other European countries such as Germany", the European Commission against Racism and Intolerance (ECRI), in its third report on the Netherlands in 2008, described the Turkish minority group as a notable community particularly affected by "stigmatisation of and discrimination against members of minority groups", as a result of controversial policies of Dutch governments. In the same report, the ECRI also noted that "the tone of Dutch political and public debate around integration and other issues relevant to ethnic minorities had experienced a dramatic deterioration".

The European Network Against Racism (ENAR), a coalition of anti-racist NGOs funded by the European Union (EU), published a report in 2009 showing that half of Turkish Dutch people reported having experienced racial discrimination. In the same report, the ENAR pointed out a "dramatic growth of Islamophobia" in parallel with antisemitism. The former European Monitoring Centre on Racism and Xenophobia (EUMC) also reported a negative trend in attitudes towards minorities in the Netherlands in 2001, compared to average EU results. In its analysis, the EUMC also noted that, compared to most other European citizens, the Dutch majority group is "more in favour of cultural assimilation of minorities" rather than "cultural enrichment by minority groups".

Notable occurrences of anti-Turkish violence in the Netherlands were the 1972 Afrikaanderwijk riots and the 1975 Schiedam riots.

== Crime ==
In 2015, individuals with a Turkish background were about 2.5 times as likely to be suspected of a crime compared to the overall native Dutch population, with of the first generation 1.7% being suspected, and of the second generation 3.6% (total males 4.28% and women 0.67%). However, when corrected for socio-economic position, Dutch people of Turkish descent (with the exception of adult Turks from the second generation) are not more often suspected of crime than native Dutch people, according to numbers from 2012 and reports from 2014.

In 2022, those between the ages of 12 and 17 with a turkish background were 1.63 times more likely to be suspect of a crime (down from 2.39x compared to 2010), while young adults aged 18 to 22 were 1.76 times more likely (down from 2x). For contrast, the second largest ethnic group, Moroccans, commit 2.8 and 3.47 times more crime than the native population respectively. It's important to note that these figures were not adjusted for socioeconomic situation or education.

== Education ==
According to The Netherlands Institute for Social Research annual report of 2005, most of the original first-generation Turkish migrants of the 1960s and 1970s had a very low level of education with many of them having had little or no schooling at all. In addition to these, many of the Turkish "marriage migrants" who arrived in the Netherlands by marrying an immigrant already living in the country as well as the 'in-between-generation' which arrived while aged 6–18 have a low education. An outcome of this circumstance is a poor command of the Dutch language.

All Turkish children of the second generation have attended primary and secondary education. However, their educational levels were on average lower. While almost half of the native Dutch population (and Iranian origin pupils) had ever attended higher secondary education (HAVO) or pre-university education (VWO), in 2005 only a fifth of the Turkish second generation had. In 2015, the Turkish second generation percentage had increased to 27%. In 2024, 45.9% of the native Dutch population had attained a higher education at college or university level, compared to 27.7% of the second generation Turkish population. If one parent is native born, then the share goes up to 29.3%. The situation is different when looking at Turks in Turkey: in the 25–34 age group, 44.9 percent of the population in Turkey held a higher education degree. This was just 13.5% in 2008.

== Associations and Organisations ==
- Alblasserdam Batı Trakya Türkleri Cemiyeti ("Alblasserdam Western Thrace Turks Association")
- Hollanda Türk Federasyon ("Turkish Federation of the Netherlands")
- Hollanda Batı Trakya Türk Kültür ve Dayanışma Derneği ("Western Thrace Turks Culture and Solidarity Association of the Netherlands")
- Hollanda Balkan Türkleri Kültür ve Dayanışma Derneği ("Balkan Turks Culture and Solidarity Association of the Netherlands")
- Hollanda Bulgaristan Türkleri Derneği ("Bulgarian Turks Association of the Netherlands")
- Hollanda Irak Türkmen Diasporası Derneği ("Iraqi Turkmen Disapora Association of the Netherlands")
- Hollanda Lahey Batı Trakya Türk Birlik ve Beraberlik Derneği ("Hague Western Thrace Turks Unity Association of the Netherlands")
- Irak Türkleri Gök Hilal Vakfı ("Iraqi Turkish Sky Crescent Foundation")
- Türkmen Tanış Derneği ("Turkmen Meeting Association")

== Notable people ==
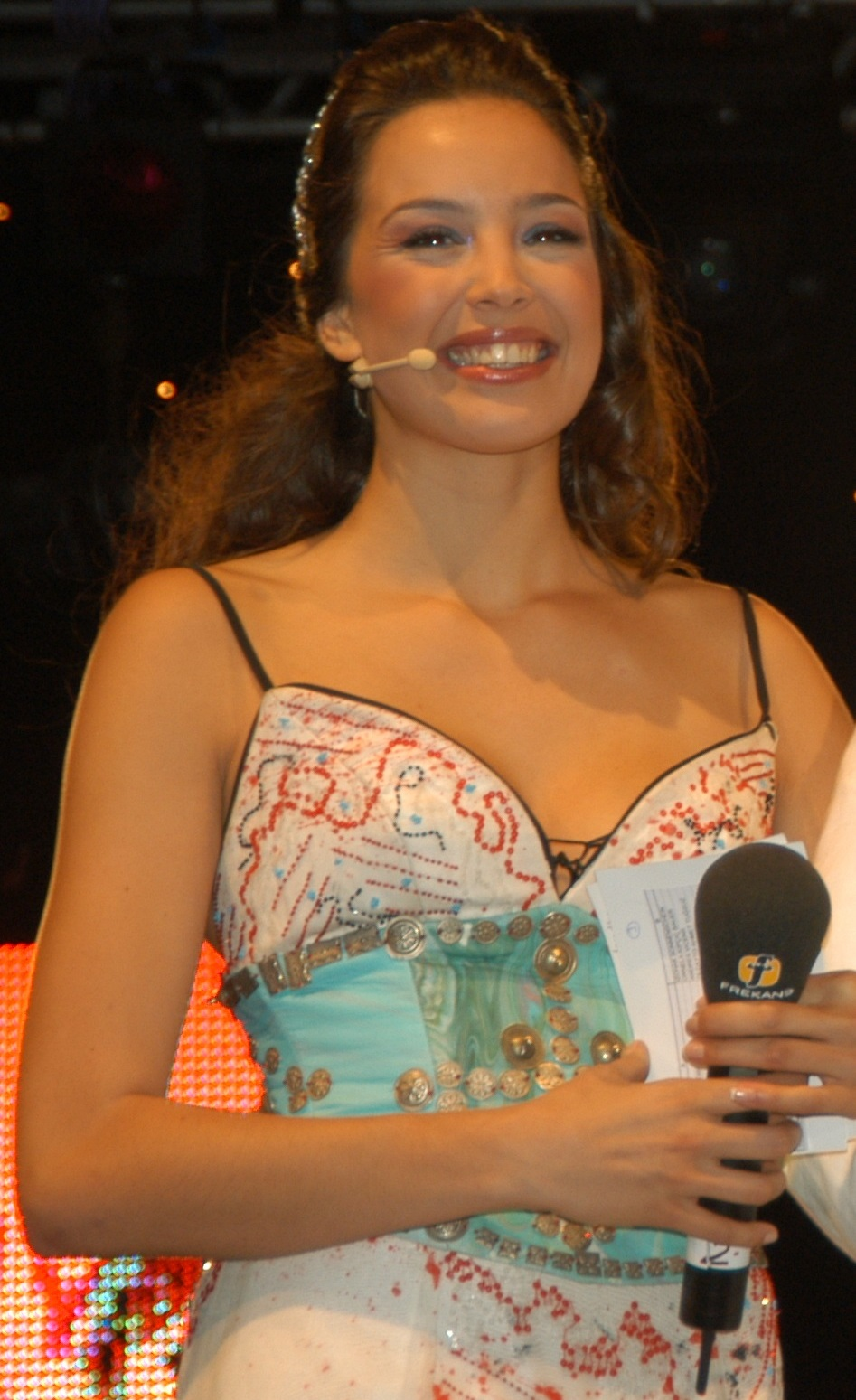
Azra Akın, crowned Miss Turkey and Miss World 2002

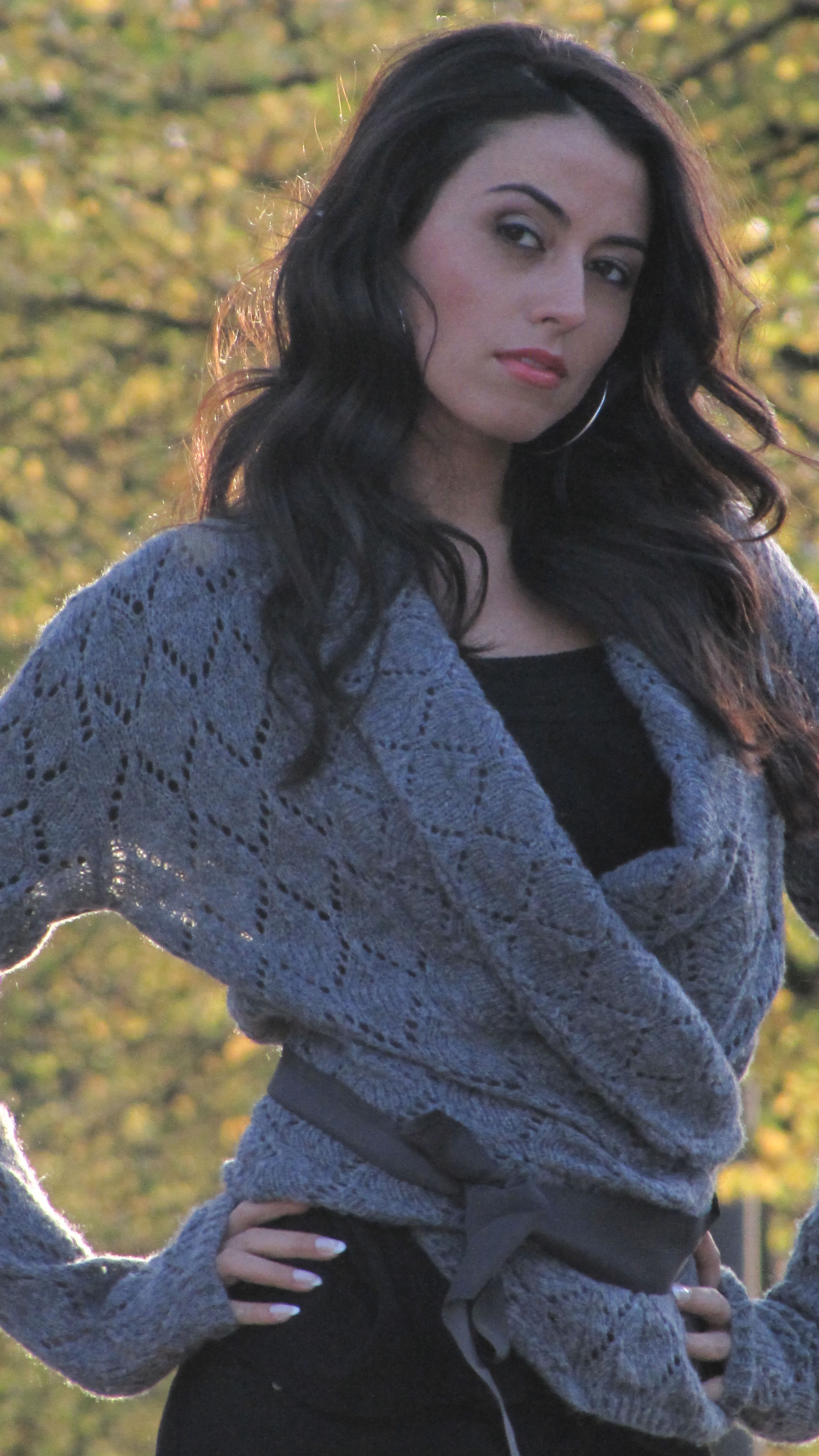
Deniz Akkoyun, crowned Miss Nederland 2008

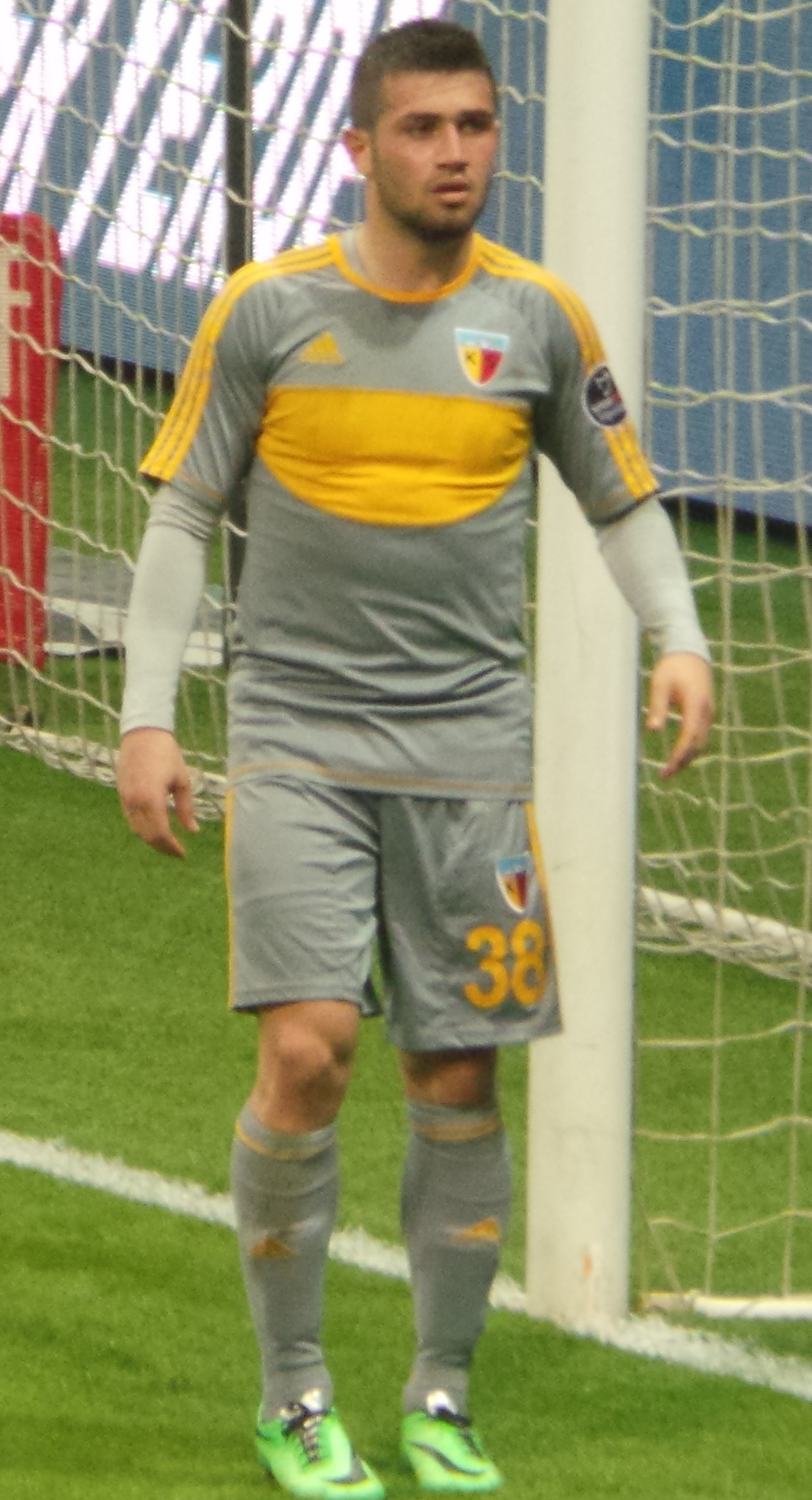
Ömer Bayram, football player

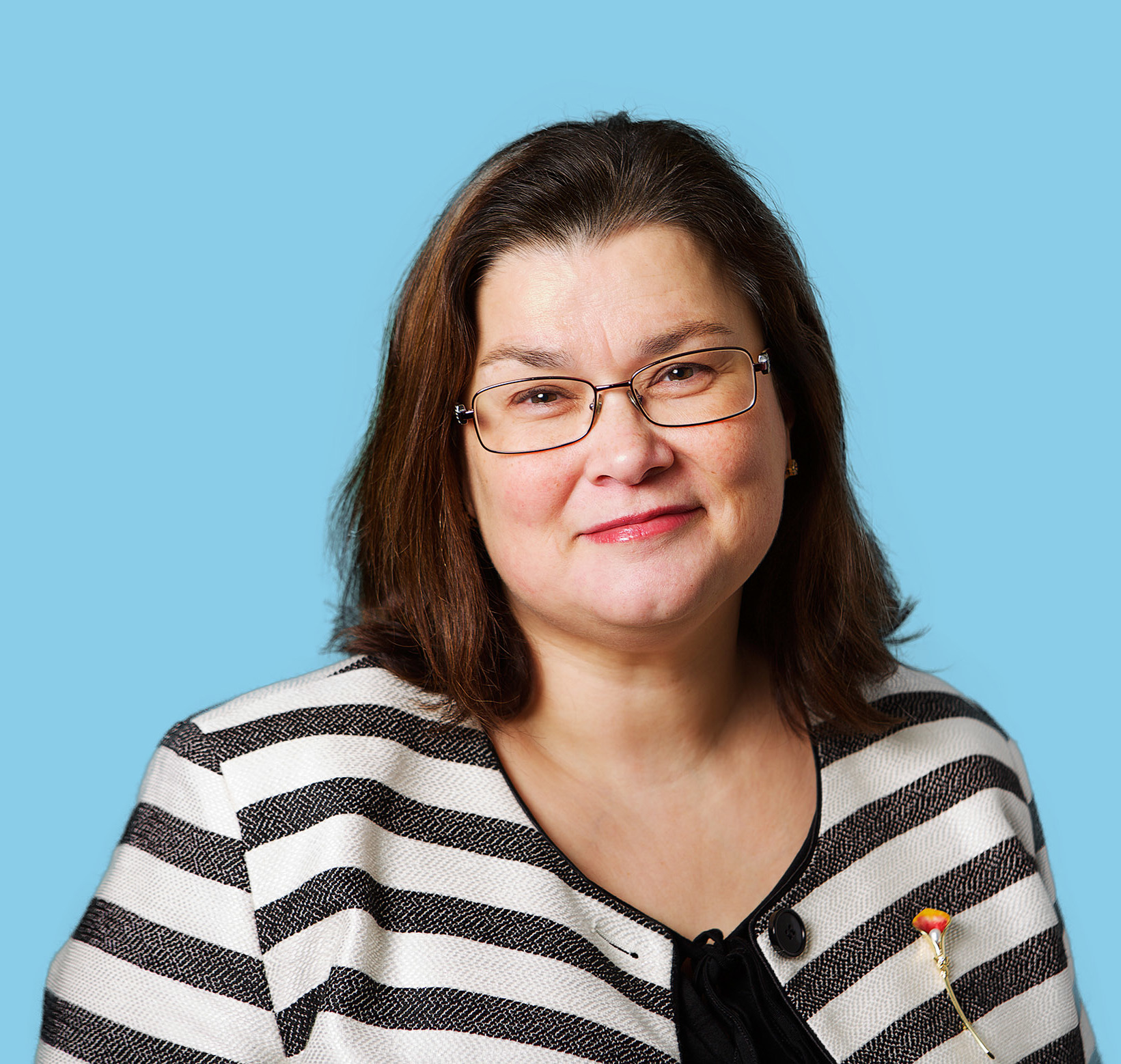
Emine Bozkurt, Member of the European Parliament (2004–14)

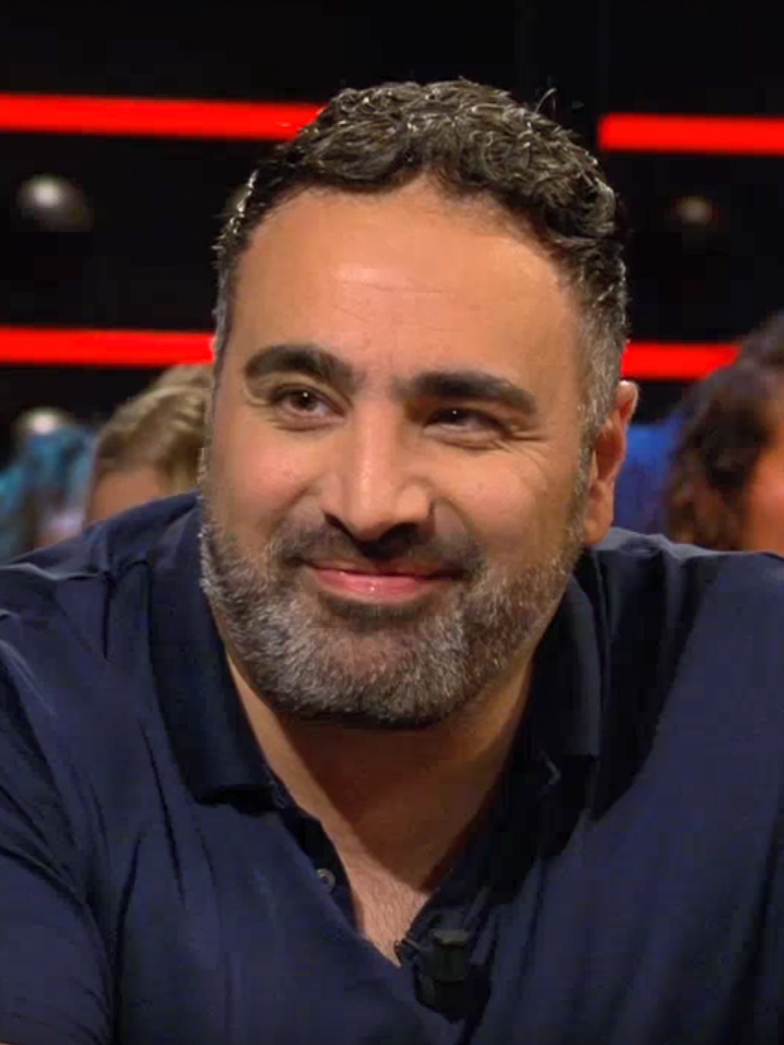
Sinan Can, journalist

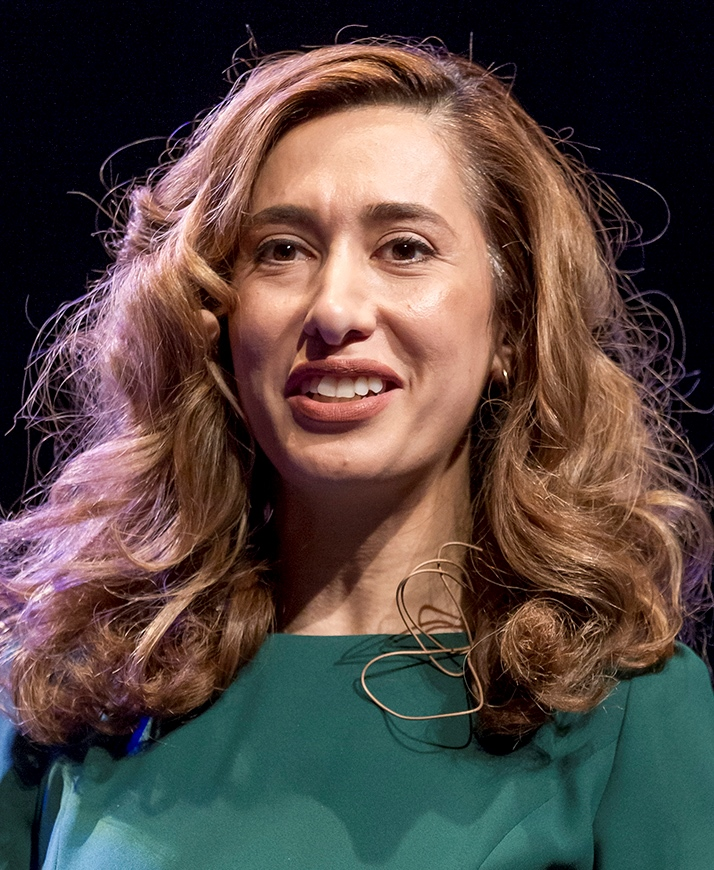
Fidan Ekiz, TV presenter and journalist

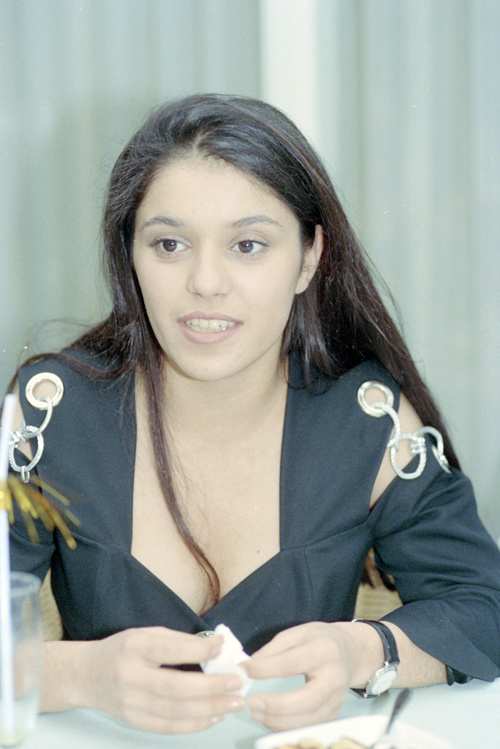
Reyhan Erdogan, actress

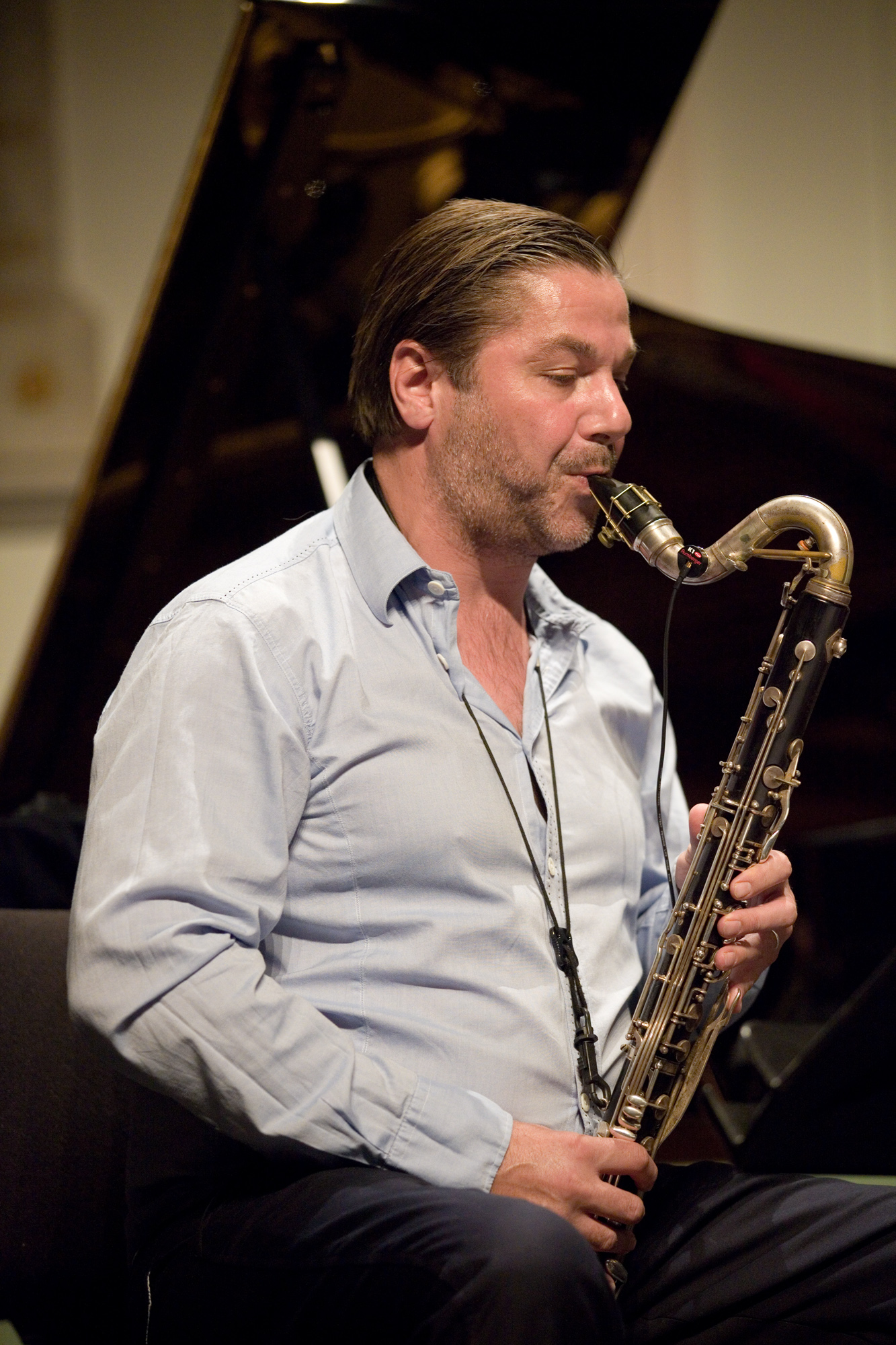
Mete Erker, saxophonist

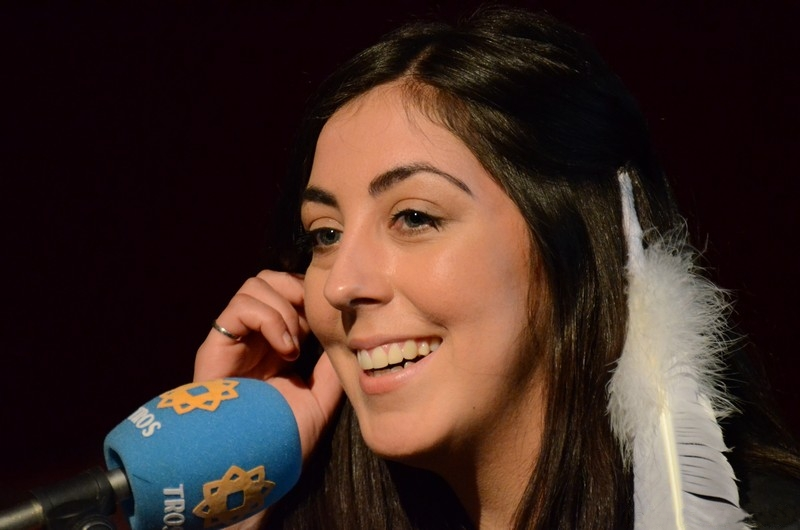
Joan Franka, singer

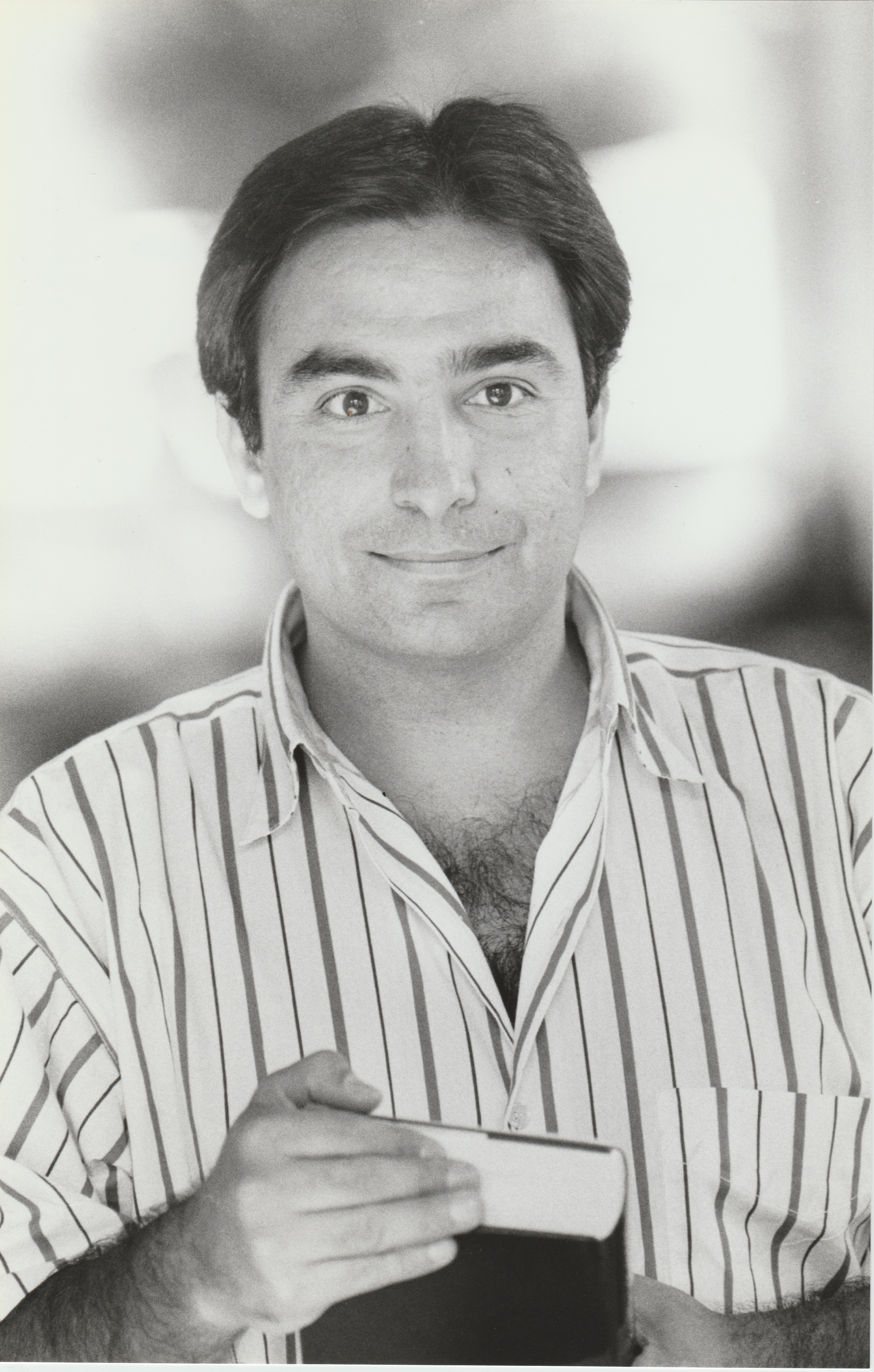
Halil Gür, author

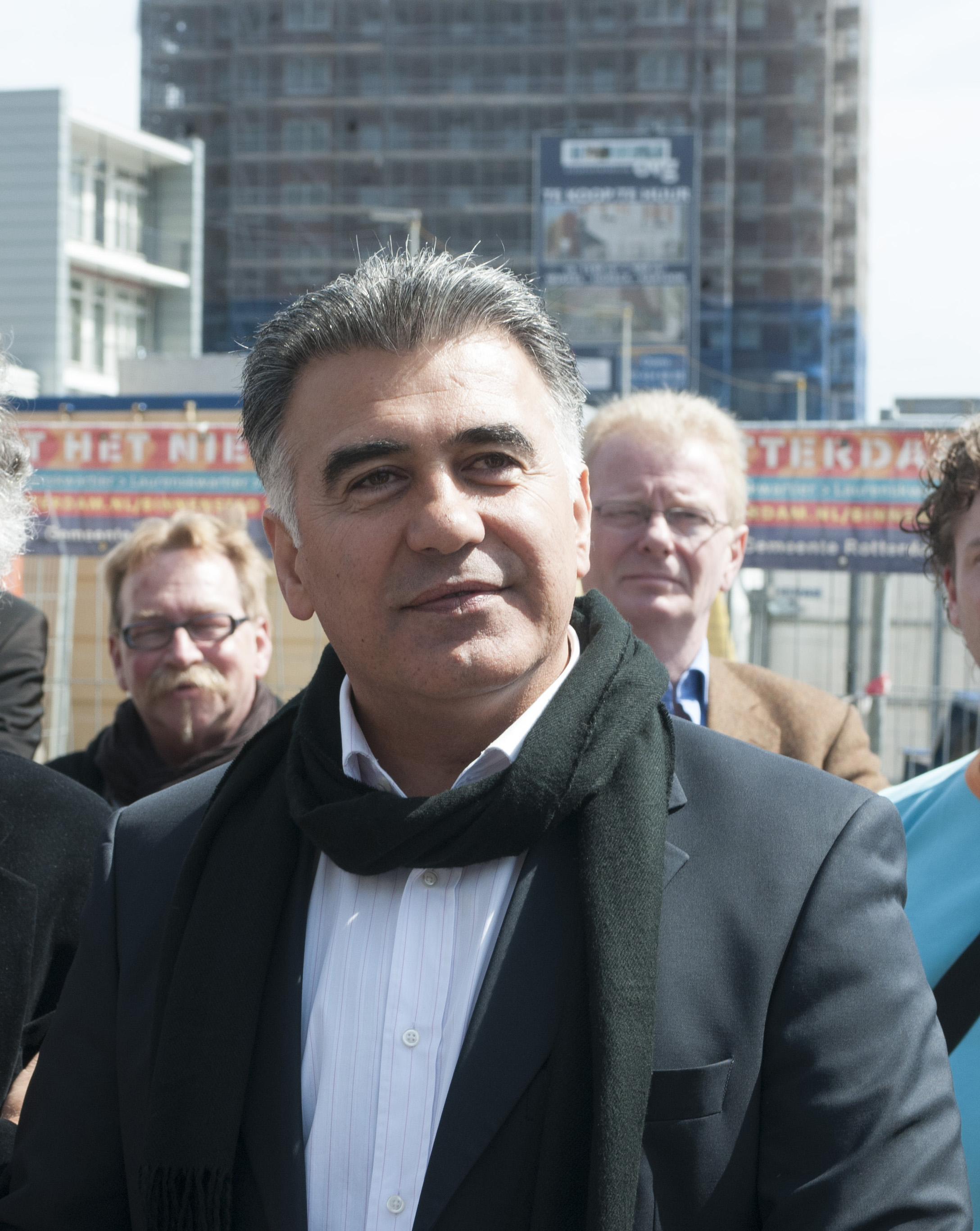
Hamit Karakus, Member of the Senate (2021–present)

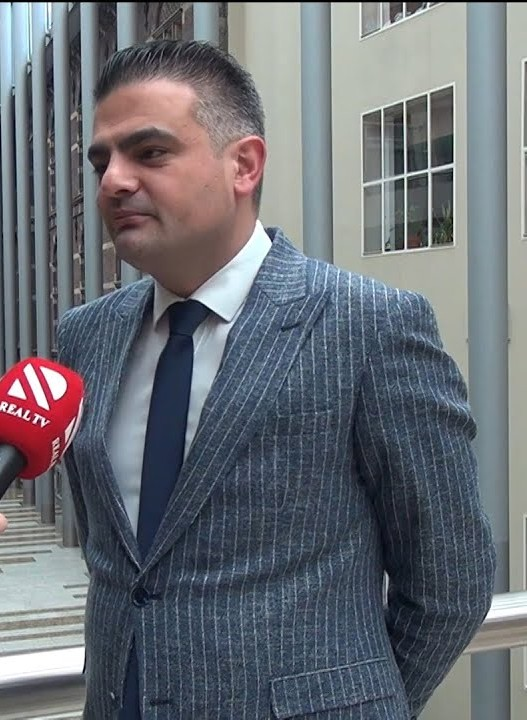
Tunahan Kuzu, co-founder of the Denk political party

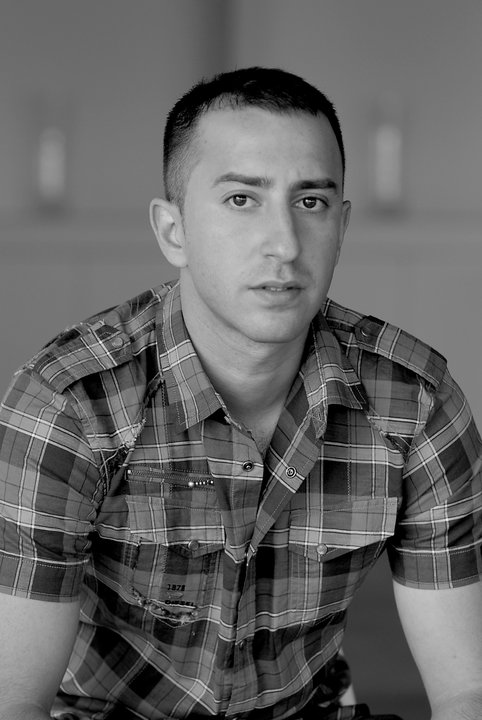
Gürkan Küçüksentürk, actor

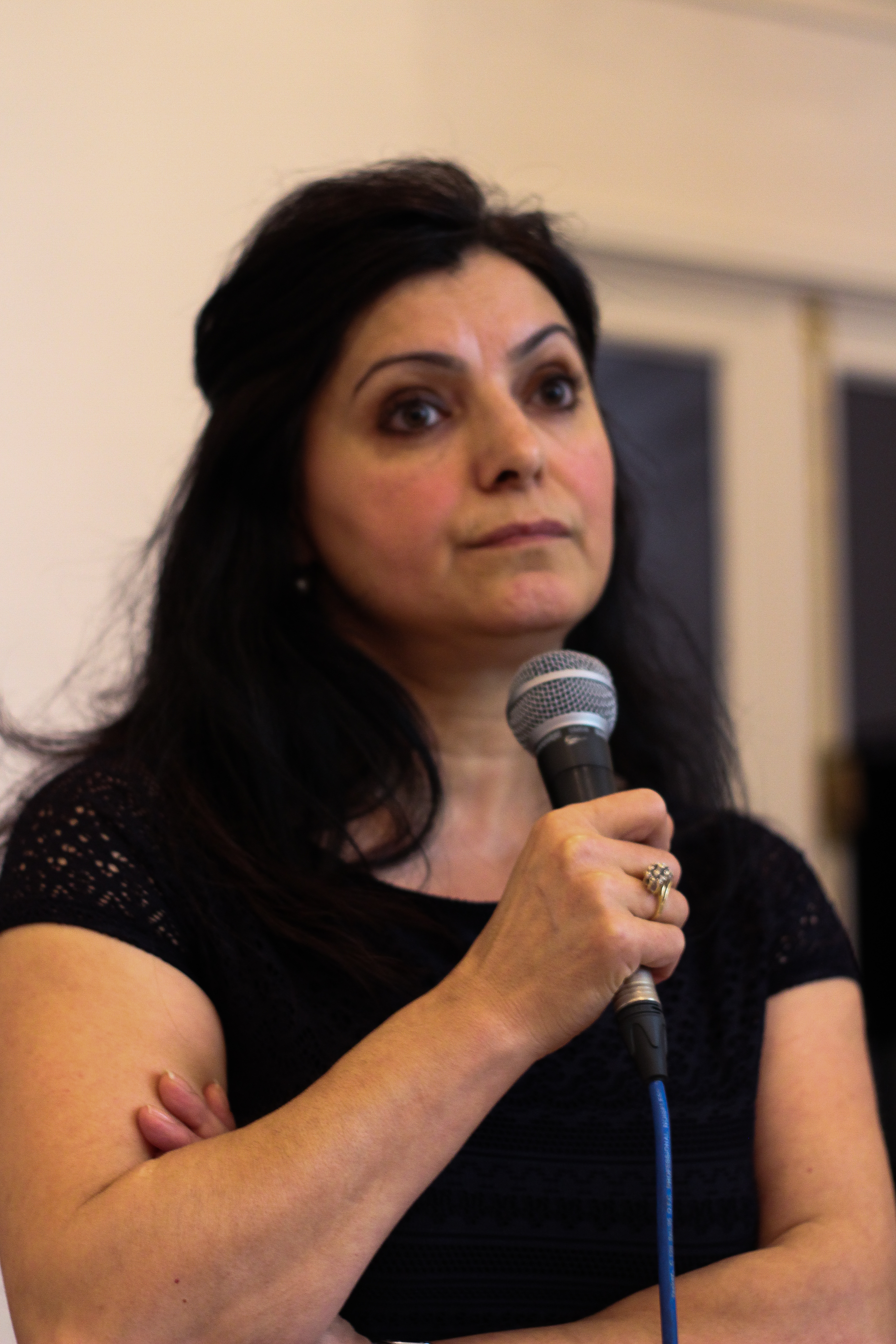
Şenay Özdemir, journalist

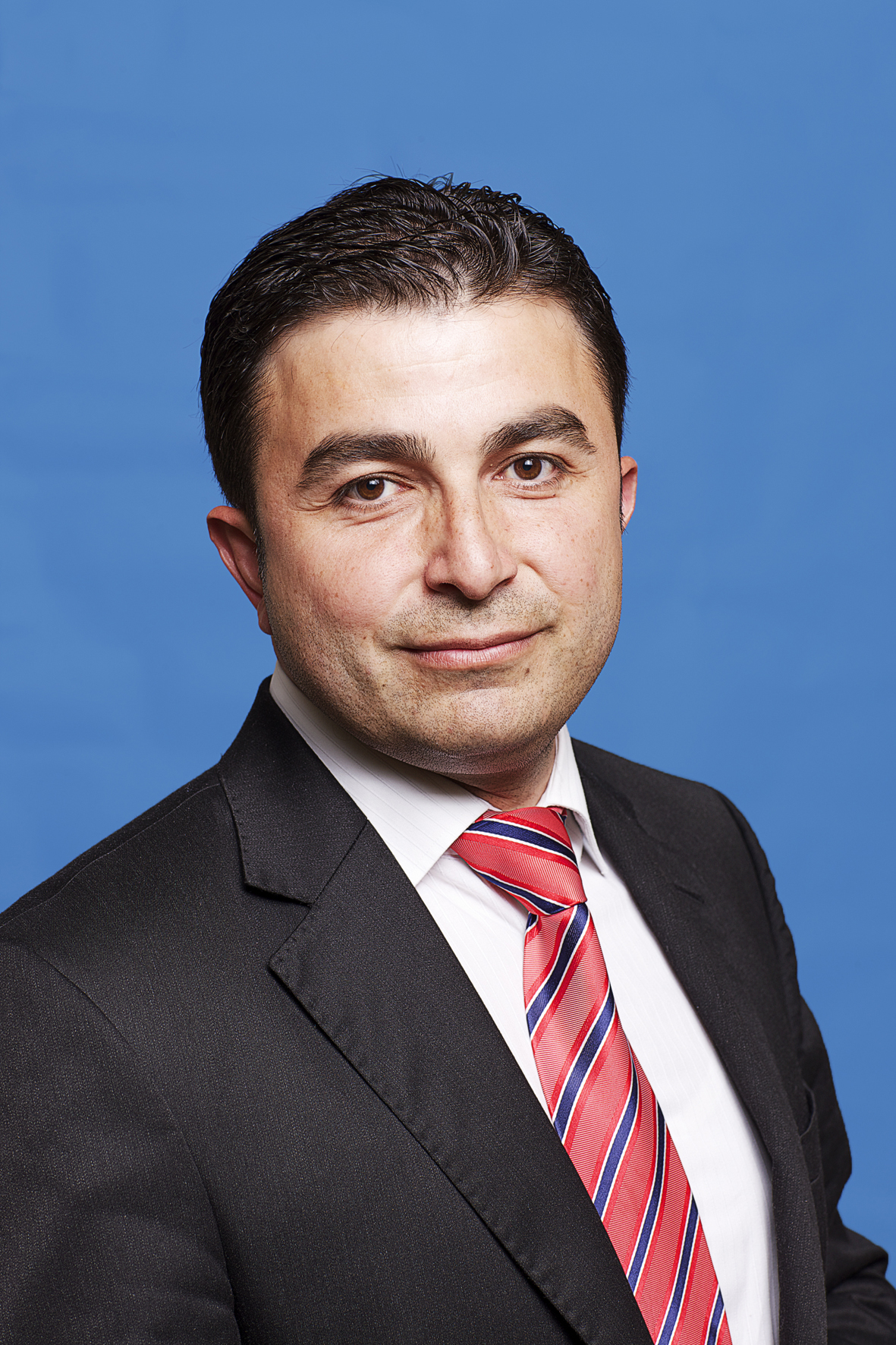
Selçuk Öztürk, co-founder of the Denk political party

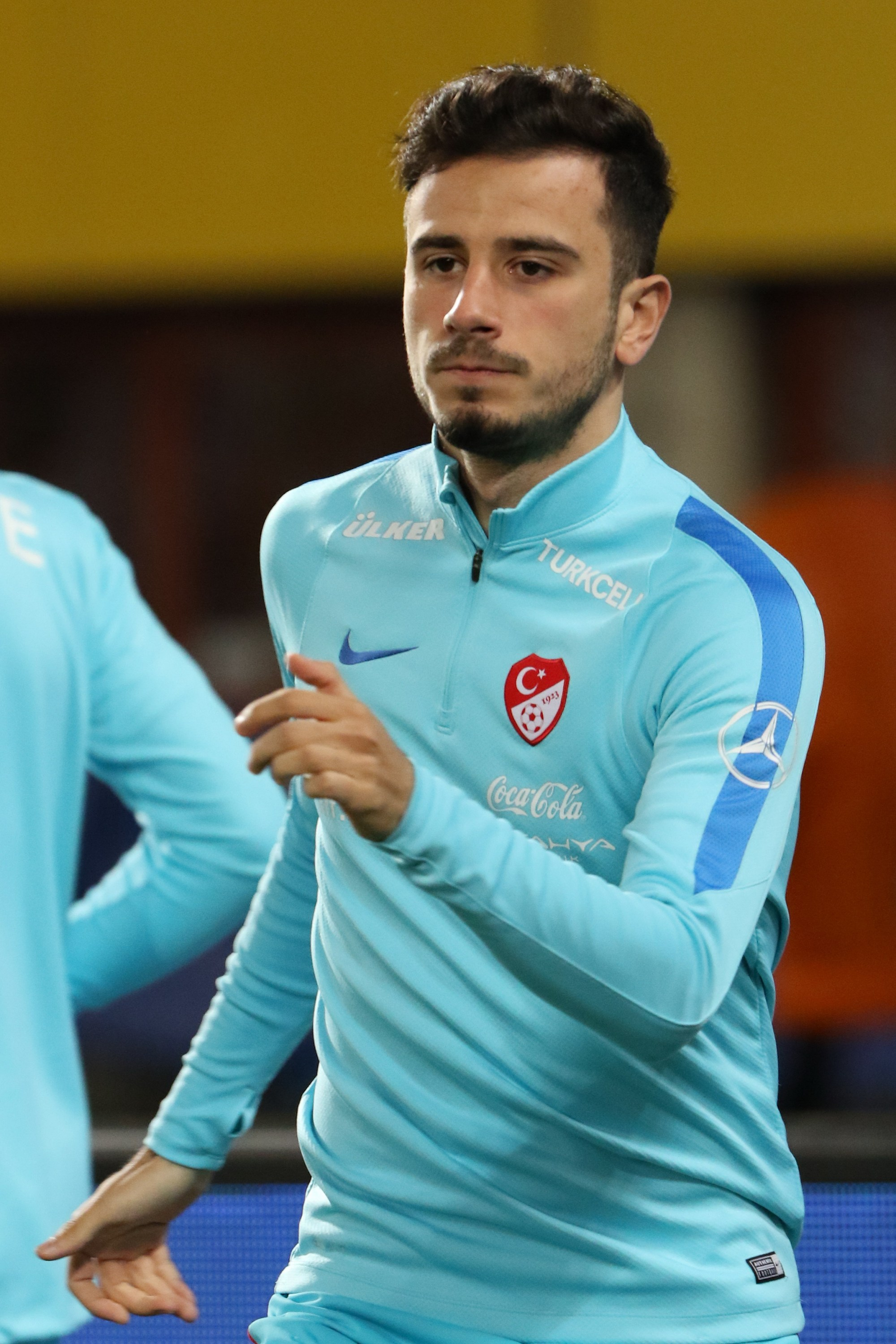
Oğuzhan Özyakup, football player

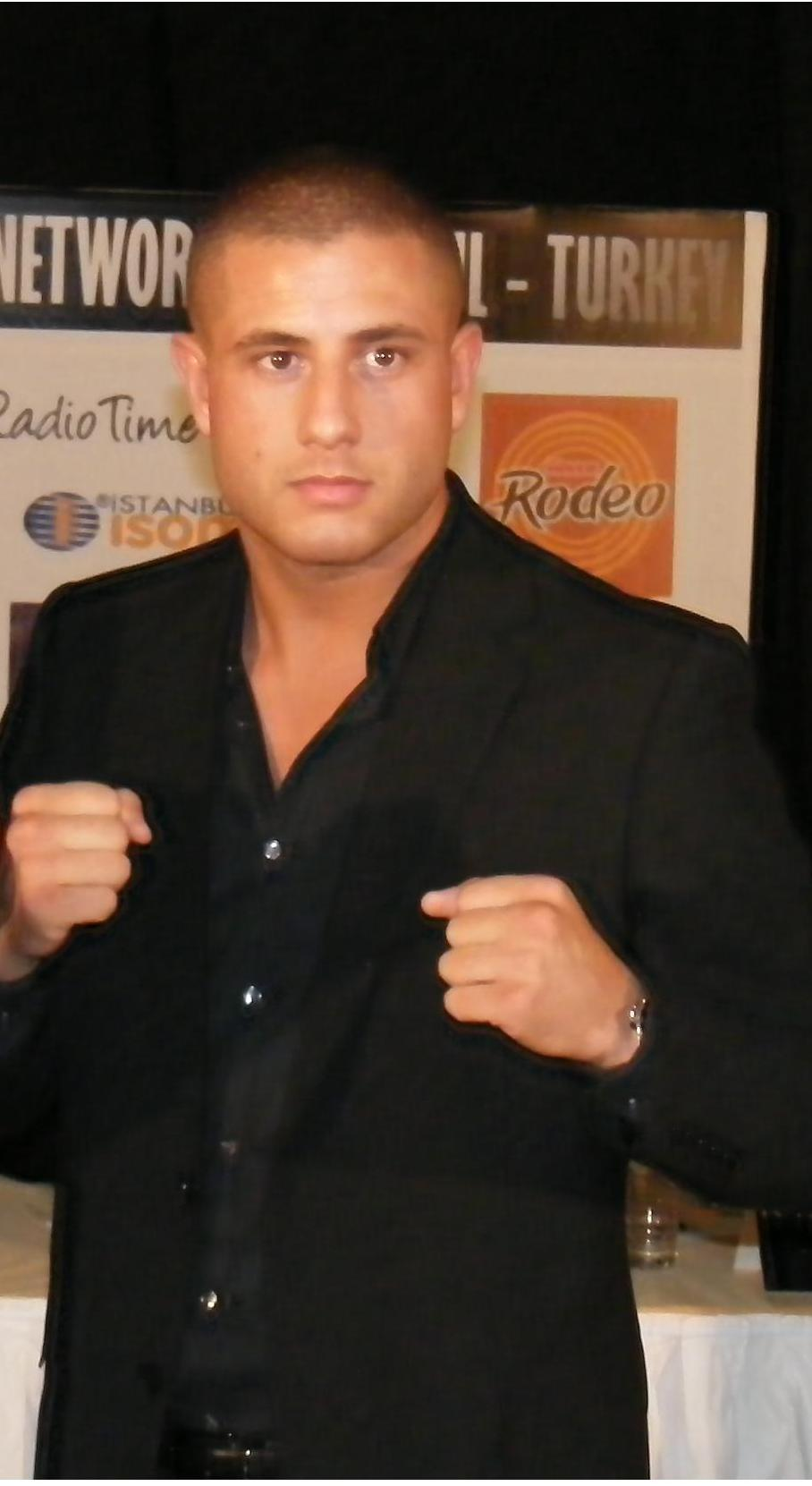
Gökhan Saki, mixed martial artist and former kickboxer

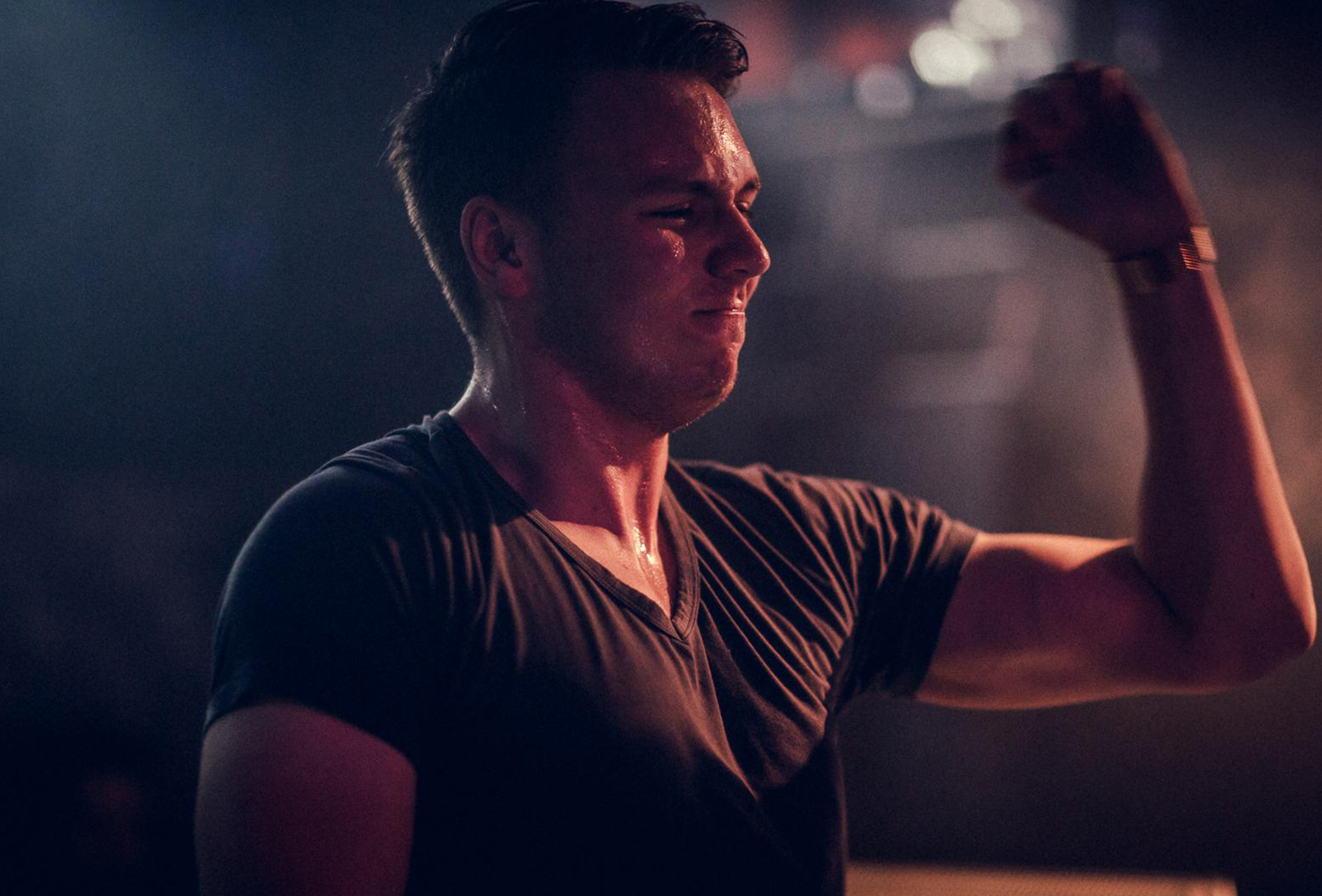
Sefa Vlaarkamp, disc jockey and music producer

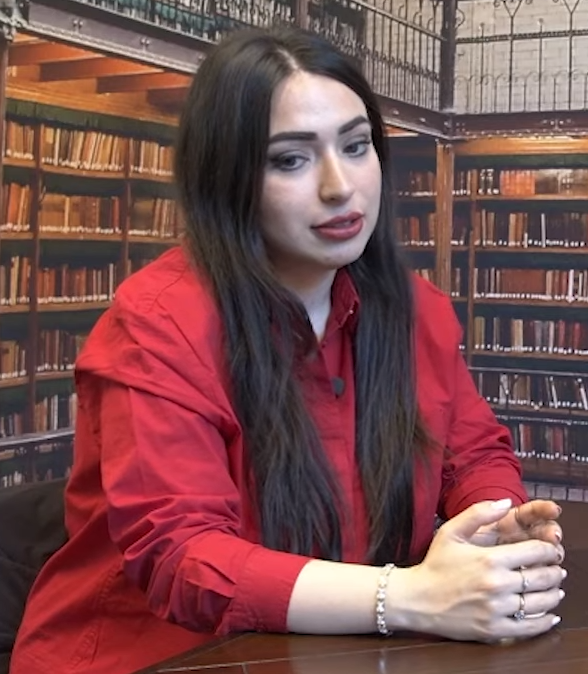
Lale Gül, writer

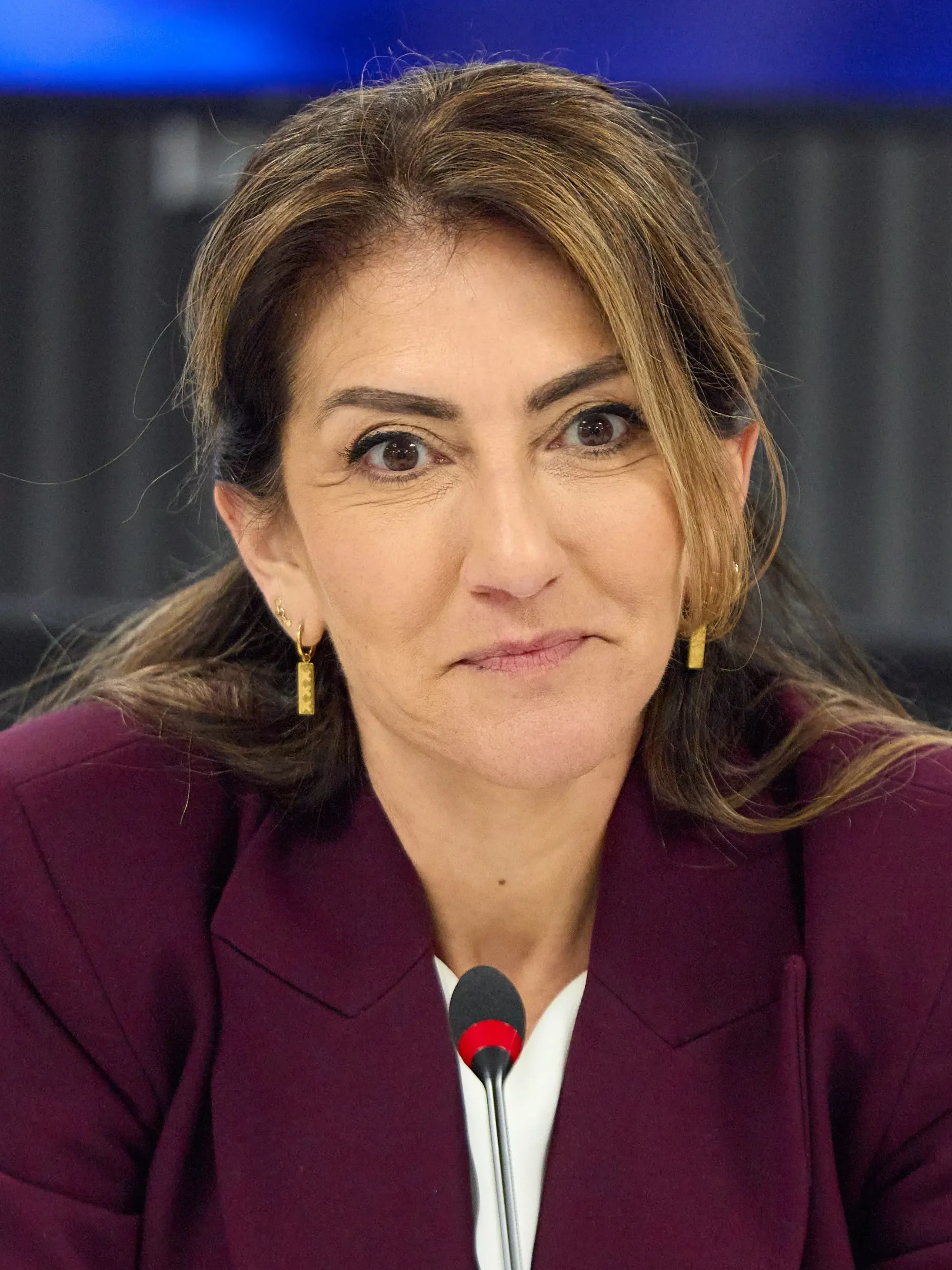
Dilan Yeşilgöz-Zegerius, Deputy Prime Minister and Minister of Defence of the Netherlands

== See also ==
- List of Dutch people of Turkish descent
- Netherlands–Turkey relations
- FC Türkiyemspor
- Turkeye
- Turkish Workers' Union in the Netherlands
- Turkish diaspora
  - Turks in Europe
    - Turks in Belgium
    - Turks in France
    - Turks in Germany
    - Turks in the United Kingdom
- 2017 Dutch–Turkish diplomatic incident

== Bibliography ==
- Akgündüz, Ahmet (2008), Labour Migration from Turkey to Western Europe, 1960-1974: A Multidisciplinary Analysis, Ashgate Publishing, ISBN 978-0-7546-7390-3.
- Baumann, Gerd; Sunier, Thijl (1995), Post-Migration Ethnicity: De-essentializing Cohesion, Commitments, and Comparison, Het Spinhuis, ISBN 90-5589-020-0.
- CBS (2007), Naar een nieuwe schatting van het aantal islamieten in Nederland (PDF), Statistics Netherlands
- Centrum voor Onderzoek en Statistiek (2005), Key figures Rotterdam 2005 (PDF), Centre for Research and Statistics
- Centrum voor Onderzoek en Statistiek (2006), Key figures Rotterdam 2006 (PDF), Centre for Research and Statistics, archived from the original (PDF) on 2011-10-09
- Dienst Onderzoek en Statistiek (2009), Amsterdam in cijfers 2009 (PDF), Stadsdrukkerij Amsterdam
- Extra, Guus; Verhoeven, Ludo Th (1993), Immigrant Languages in Europe, Multilingual Matters, ISBN 1-85359-179-3.
- Farrell, Gilda; Vladychenko, Alexander; Oliveri, Federico (2006), Achieving Social Cohesion in a Multicultural Europe: Concepts, Situation and Developments, Council of Europe, ISBN 92-871-6033-3.
- Gemeente Utrecht (2007), Bevolking van Utrecht: per 1 januari 2007 (PDF), Gemeente Utrecht
- Guentcheva, Rossitza; Kabakchieva, Petya; Kolarski, Plamen (2003), Migrant Trends VOLUME I – Bulgaria: The social impact of seasonal migration (PDF), International Organization for Migration
- Gülçiçek, Ali Riza (2006), The Turkish presence in Europe: Migrant Workers and New European Citizens (PDF), Parliamentary Assembly, archived from the original (PDF) on 1 April 2009
- Haug, Werner; Compton, Paul; Courbage, Youssef (2002), The Demographic Characteristics of Immigrant Populations, Het Spinhuis, ISBN 90-5589-020-0.
- Huis, Mila van; Nicolaas, Han; Croes, Michel (1997), Migration of the four largest cities in the Netherlands (PDF), Statistics Netherlands, archived from the original (PDF) on 2012-09-24
- Ireland, Patrick Richard (2004), Becoming Europe: Immigration, Integration, and the Welfare State, University of Pittsburgh Press, ISBN 0-8229-5845-7.
- Kennedy, Paul T.; Roudometof, Victor (2002), Communities Across Borders: New Immigrants and Transnational Cultures, Routledge, ISBN 0-415-25293-8.
- Messina, Anthony M. (2007), The Logics and Politics of post-WWII Migration to Western Europe, Cambridge University Press, ISBN 978-0-521-82134-6.
- Nicolaas, Han; Sprangers, Arno (2000), Migration Motives of non-Dutch immigrants in the Netherlands (PDF), Statistics Netherlands, archived from the original (PDF) on 2012-09-24
- Nielsen, Jørgen S. (2004), Muslims in Western Europe, Edinburgh University Press, ISBN 0-7486-1844-9.
- Ogan, Christine L. (2001), Communication and Identity in the Diaspora: Turkish Migrants in Amsterdam and their Use of Media, Lexington Books, ISBN 0-7391-0269-9.
- Panayi, Panikos (1999), Outsiders: A History of European Minorities, Continuum International Publishing Group, ISBN 1-85285-179-1.
- Şentürk, Cem (2008), West Thrace Turkish's Immigration to Europe (PDF), The Journal of International Social Research
- Statistics Netherlands (2008), Sustainability Monitor for the Netherlands 2009 (PDF), Statistics Netherlands, ISBN 978-90-357-1688-9, archived from the original (PDF) on 2013-05-01
- Statistics Netherlands (2009), Statistical yearbook 2009 (PDF), Statistics Netherlands, ISBN 978-90-357-1737-4
- Strömqvist, Sven; Verhoeven, Ludo Th (2004), Relating Events in Narrative: Volume 2: Typological and Contextual Perspectives, Lawrence Erlbaum Associates, ISBN 0-8058-4672-7.
- Türkiye Büyük Millet Meclisi (2008), İnsan Haklarını İnceleme Komisyonu'num Hollanda Ziyareti (16-21 Haziran 2008) (PDF), Grand National Assembly of Turkey
- Vermeulen, Hans; Penninx, Rinus (2000), Immigrant Integration: The Dutch Case, Het Spinhuis, ISBN 90-5589-176-2.
- Yücesoy, Eda Ünlü (2008), Everyday Urban Public Space: Turkish Immigrant Women's Perspective, Het Spinhuis, ISBN 978-90-5589-273-0.
- Ulzen, Patricia van (2007), Imagine a Metropolis: Rotterdam's Creative Class, 1970-2000, 010 Publishers, ISBN 978-90-6450-621-5.
