= Tofik Dibi =

Dutch politician (born 1980)

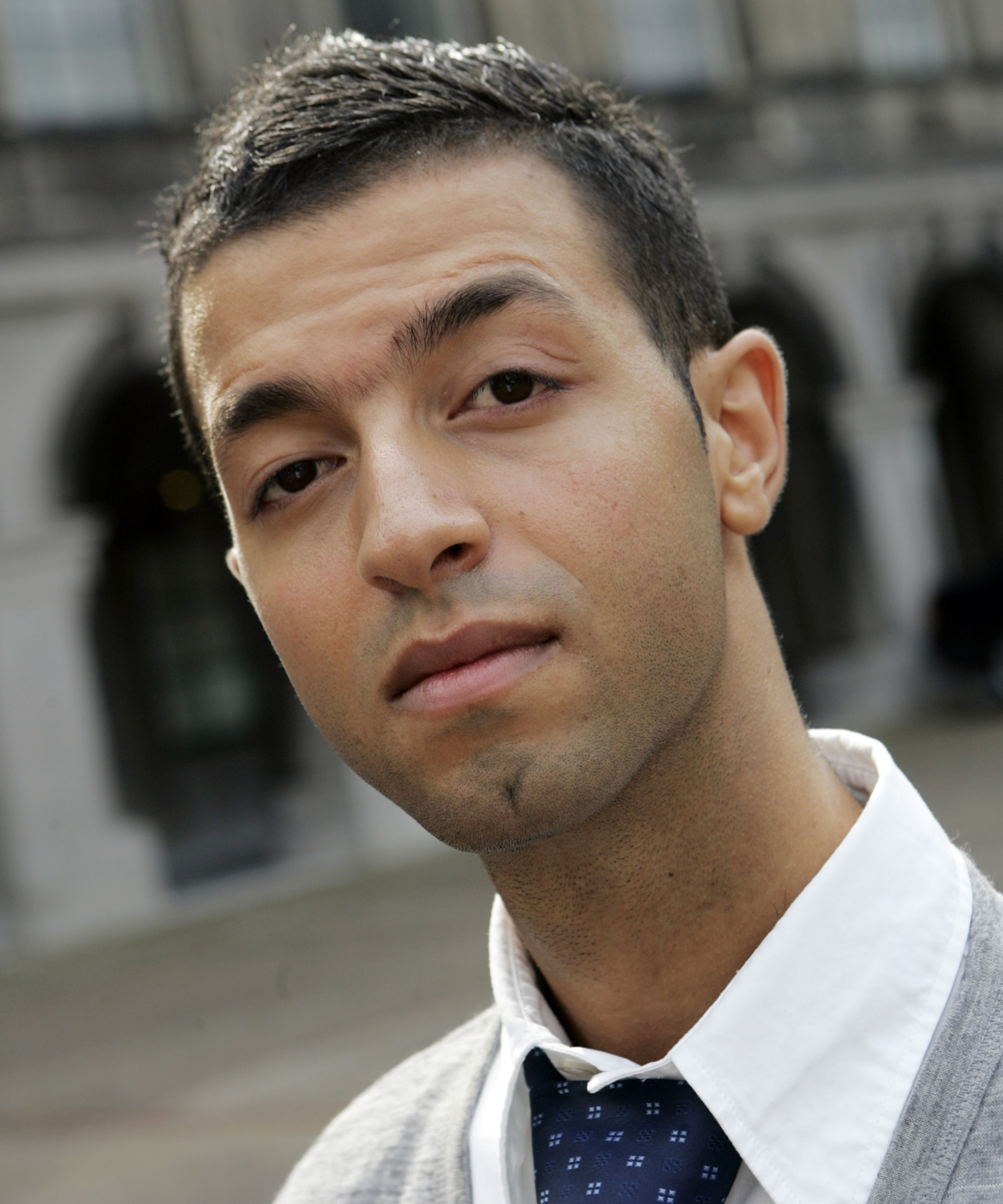
- Dibi in 2010

Member of the House of Representatives of the Netherlands
- In office 30 November 2006 – 19 September 2012

Personal details
- Born: Tovek Dibi; 19 November 1980 (age 45) Vlissingen, Netherlands
- Party: BIJ1
- Other political affiliations: GroenLinks (2006–2012)
- Website: (in Dutch) Personal website

Tovek "Tofik" Dibi (born 19 November 1980) is a Dutch politician. He is the leader of political party BIJ1, and a former member of GreenLeft (GroenLinks). He was a Member of Parliament from 30 November 2006 till 19 September 2012. He focused on matters of criminal law, safety, youth, family, and integration.

== Biography ==
=== Early life ===
Dibi is of Moroccan descent. He has studied Media and Culture at the University of Amsterdam, specializing in cinema, but he didn't finish his studies. As a student he was active as organisor in the Turkish Workers' Union in the Netherlands (Turkish: Hollanda Türkiyeli Isçiler Birligi (HTIB), Dutch: Turkse Arbeidersvereniging in Nederland), and in his own neighborhood Bos en Lommer in Amsterdam. He initiated the national demonstration Stop Bush! organizing protests when George W. Bush visited the Netherlands in 2005, and the national action committee Enough is Enough, which focused on discrimination against Muslims.

=== GreenLeft (GroenLinks) ===
In September 2006 Dibi unexpectedly came in seventh on the list of GreenLeft for the 2006 general elections and was chosen in the House of Representatives in November 2006. The GreenLeft screening commission called him "a political talent", to Dibi's own amazement, for he had not considered his candidacy all that seriously.

On 13 January 2008 Dibi was arrested and later released while pamphleteering against Dutch politician Geert Wilders with members of the International Socialists. Their posters called Wilders "an extremist" and "harmful to society".

In May 2012 he made public his internal candidacy for heading the GroenLinks list for the September 2012 elections. He lost the internal elections to Jolande Sap, netting 12% of the vote versus Saps 84%. He then asked for a low place on the list, which would only allow him to campaign purely for preference votes. He did not get re-elected.

=== As an author and a city worker ===
After his departure from parliament, he returned to university where he studied until 2014, leaving without a qualification.

Dibi publicly disclosed his homosexuality on 23 October 2015, in an interview with the newspaper De Volkskrant. On the same day, he released a memoir, Djinn. The book deals with his struggles with his homosexuality, which he had kept secret during his time as a member of parliament, his Muslim background, and his political career. Djinn was translated into English in 2021.

In 2018 Dibi got a job as policy advisor at the city of Amsterdam. He caused minor uproar by sharing pro-Palestinian pamphlets criticising right-wing Dutch parties.

In 2020, his second book got published: 'Het monster van Wokeness' (The Monster of Wokeness), in which he explores why social justice warriors often angry people.

Dibi cut his final ties with GreenLeft in 2023, when Kauthar Bouchallikht quit over the party's reaction to the October 7 attacks. In a statement on social media she explained that the Hamas attacks should be interpreted within the context of the Israeli occupation of Palestine.

=== Bij1 ===
In 2025 Tofik Dibi applied as a candidate for the presidency of Bij1, a left-wing political party. He won from Patricia Dinkela and campaigned for a seat in parliament in the 2025 Dutch general election. Bij1 received 0.42% of the votes, not enough for a seat. In March 2026, Dibi was elected into the Amsterdam city council.

== Works ==
- Dibi, Tofik (2021). Djinn. State University of New York Press. ISBN 978-1-4384-8130-2
- Dibi, Tofik (2020-09-10). Het Monster van Wokeness (in Dutch). Prometheus, Uitgeverij. ISBN 978-90-446-3759-5
