= Turkish Workers' Union in the Netherlands =

The Turkish Workers' Union in the Netherlands (Turkish: Hollanda Türk Isçiler Birligi (HTIB), Dutch: Turkse Arbeidersvereniging in Nederland) is a left-wing organization founded in 1974 by a group Turkish workers. Its first purpose was to commit Turkish workers in the Netherlands to the struggle for an independent and democratic Turkey, and to organize Turkish workers and help them in the struggle for their rights. The HTIB publishes the magazine Gerçek (Truth).

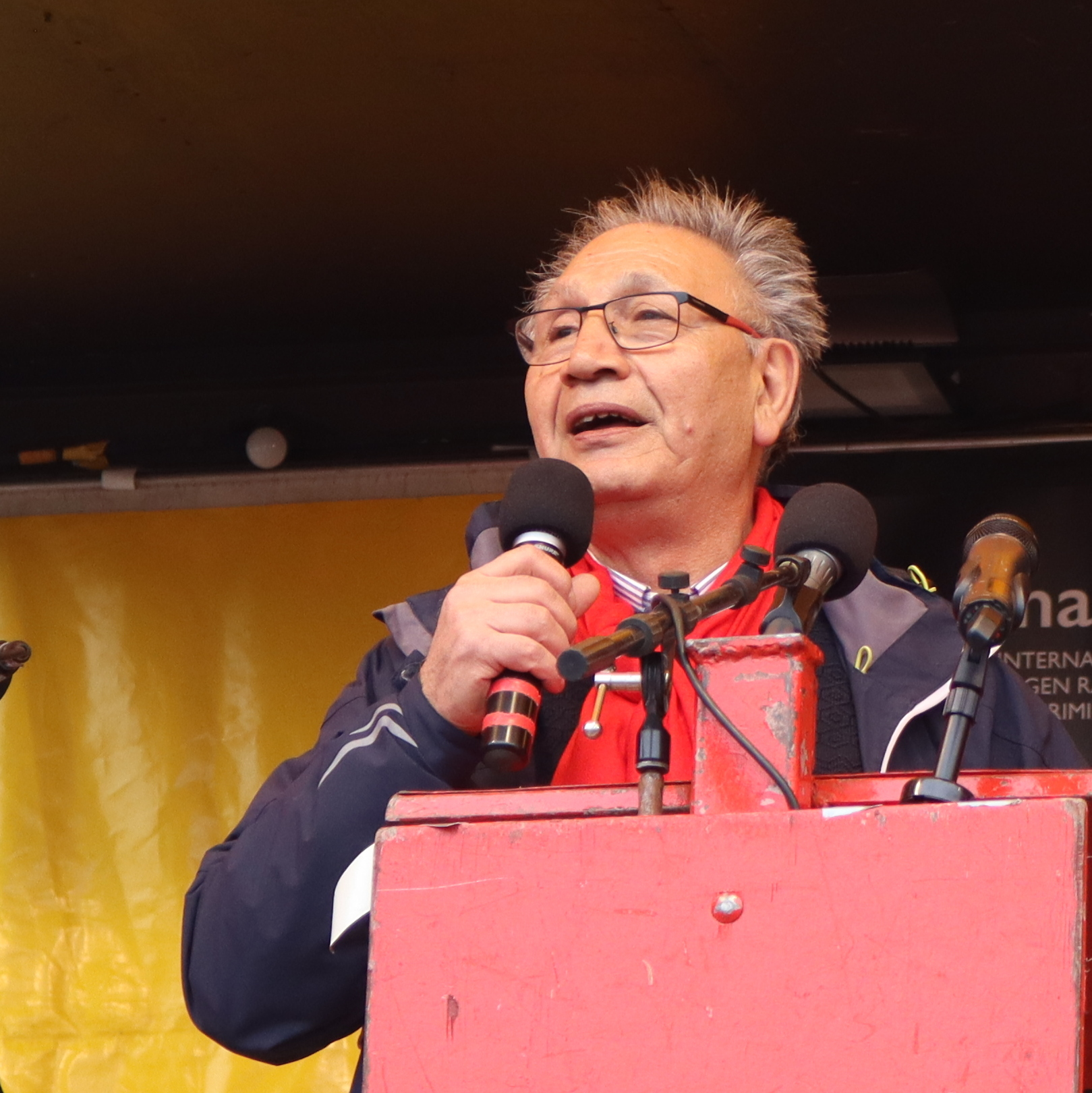
Mustafa Ayranci, 2025

Among its executive members until 2010 was the Groenlinks deputy Tofik Dibi, although born in a Moroccan family. Its chairperson since 2001 is Mustafa Ayranci, who was among its founding members in 1974.

== See also ==
- Turks in the Netherlands
