= Ludo Verhoeven =

Dutch researcher in language and literacy development

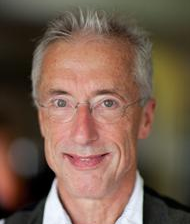
- Born: December 21, 1950 (age 75); Breda, Netherlands
- Known for: Research on children's language and literacy development; Literacy development in bilingual and multilingual settings; Reading difficulties and dyslexia
- Scientific career
- Fields: Educational psychology; Psycholinguistics; Literacy research
- Workplaces: Radboud University; Expertisecentrum Nederlands; University of Curaçao

Ludo Verhoeven (born 1950 in Breda, Netherlands) is a Dutch researcher in language and literacy development. He is emeritus professor of communication, language and literacy at Radboud University Nijmegen and the University of Curaçao. His research focuses on spoken and written language acquisition, particularly multilingual literacy, reading comprehension, developmental dyslexia, and differences among writing systems.

== Academic career ==
Verhoeven earned his doctorate at Tilburg University in 1987. He became professor of orthopedagogy at the Catholic University of Nijmegen, renamed Radboud University Nijmegen in 2004.

The Expertisecentrum Nederlands was founded in 1996 and began operating under the co-direction of Verhoeven. Verhoeven remained a professor at Radboud and the center's scientific director until June 2016. He then held the part-time Kentalis-endowed chair in Variation in Communication, Language and Literacy at Radboud, while also serving as extraordinary professor at the University of Curaçao. He is now emeritus professor at both universities.

In 2016, Verhoeven was appointed an Officer of the Order of Orange-Nassau. He served as president of the Society for the Scientific Study of Reading in 2018 and 2019.

== Research ==
Verhoeven's research examines how children acquire spoken and written language, with particular attention to multilingual learners and reading development across languages. His longitudinal studies examined how decoding, vocabulary, listening comprehension, and reading comprehension interact over development. His bilingual research investigated which language and literacy skills transfer between a child's languages. A later meta-analysis found stronger cross-language relationships for phonological awareness and decoding than for oral-language skills, while also noting substantial variation among studies.

He also studied developmental dyslexia and how differences among writing systems influence learning to read. With Charles Perfetti, he reviewed evidence for processes common across languages and for demands specific to individual languages and scripts. He also co-edited three Cambridge University Press volumes on literacy acquisition, dyslexia, and global variation in literacy development.
