= Turkeye =

Hamlet in Zeeland, Netherlands

- Hamlet
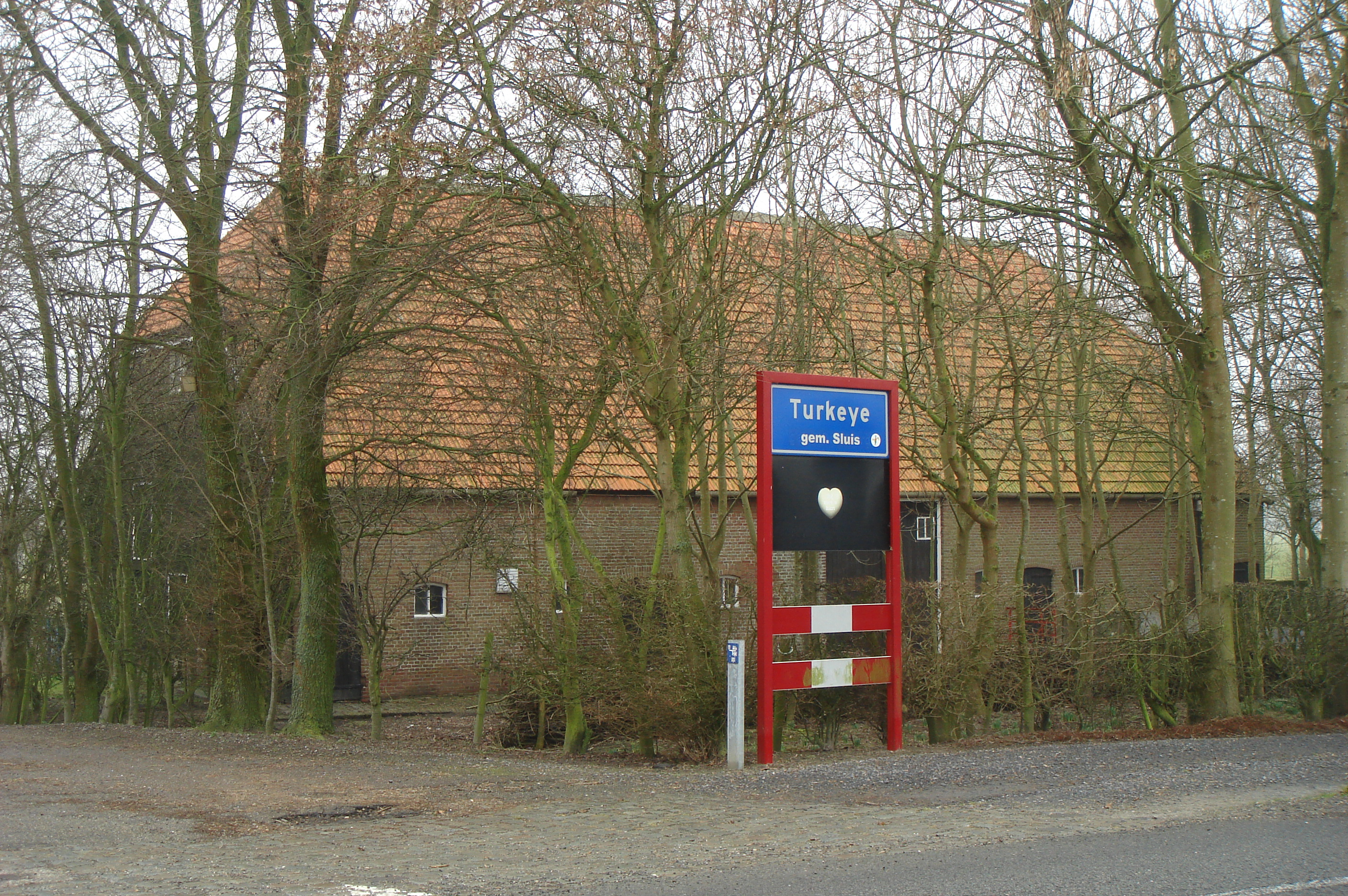

- Location of Turkeye in the province of Zeeland
- Coordinates: 51°19′05″N 3°34′55″E
- Country: Netherlands
- Province: Zeeland
- Municipality: Sluis

Population
  - Estimate (2020): 20−30

Turkeye is a hamlet of Sluis, a municipality located in the west of Zeelandic Flanders, in the south-western part of the Netherlands.

== Name ==
Even though the settlement is regular hamlet in the province of Zeeland, the name Turkeye is probably an old spelling for Modern Dutch Turkije (English: Turkey; Turkish: Türkiye). The name supposedly derives from relations between the Ottoman Turks and the Netherlands. The name of the road to it is the Turkijeweg which means Turkey Road in Dutch. Signs in the hamlet play into the name, saying Ne mutlu Türküm diyene ("How happy is the one, who says 'I am a Turk'") or Hoş geldiniz ("Welcome"). There are also paintings of Ottoman sultans on some walls. Monique Sturm, who has been a volunteer Turkish ambassador in the hamlet for 30 years, turned a part of her house into a Turkish museum with items she brought from Turkey.

== History ==
From 1796 to 1970, the hamlet of Turkeye was part of the municipality of Waterlandkerkje. In 1970, this municipality merged with the municipality of Oostburg, which in turn was merged into the municipality of Sluis. The history of Turkeye starts after the conquest of Sluis in 1604 by the State army. The defeated Spanish troops withdrew and left 1,500 galley slaves, among whom a large number of Muslims from the Ottoman Empire, referred to in short as Turcken. The States-General decided to release these slaves and to send the Turks back to their homeland. So they hoped to acquire the support of the Ottoman Empire in the fight against Spain. However, the so-called Flemish Turks have once again been enslaved in Marseille, and have not been able to reach the Ottoman Empire. Prince Maurits may have attached the name Turkeye as an extra tribute to the Schans Turkeye, which was constructed in the same year 1604 and to which the nearby hamlet would later be named.

A bond has grown between the neighborhood Turkeye and the Turkish community in the Netherlands and Turkey. A few inhabitants of the hamlet are involved, as well as the Stichting Vriendschapsband Nederland-Turkije. There are regular visits by Turkish delegations and dignitaries such as diplomats. There are also place name signs Turkeye, gem. Sluis placed in the Turkish cities of Dalaman and Trabzon, where many Dutch tourists come. In 2012, it was celebrated that there are 400 years of diplomatic relations between Turkey and the Netherlands: In 1612 the Republic of the Seven United Netherlands was recognized by the Ottoman Empire.

== Demographics ==
The hamlet has 20 to 30 inhabitants, all Dutch citizens. The largest part of the houses in the hamlet serves as a holiday home. Everyone in the hamlet is Dutch.
