= List of motions of no confidence in the Netherlands =

Many motions of no confidence have been put to the vote by one or more Members of Parliament in the Senate and House of Representatives of The Netherlands. Most of them did not pass.

== Background ==
The number of motions of no confidence has increased sharply since the 2000s. The Party for Freedom and its predecessor Group Wilders in particular submitted many motions of no confidence, but none passed. The highest number of motions of no-confidence were submitted against the third Rutte cabinet, namely 38.

The only motion of no confidence adopted was the Deckers motion in 1939 against the newly appointed fifth Colijn cabinet. The low success rate is partly because ministers often resign before a vote, when they suspect that a motion will pass or will receive strong support. Examples of this are the resignation of Menno Snel, Jeanine Hennis-Plasschaert and the third Rutte cabinet.

Sometimes other motions and votes, such as a motion of disapproval or disapproval of the budget, are reasons for a minister to resign. The minister then interprets the submission as expressing distrust. Examples of this are the Cals cabinet, during the so-called Night of Schmelzer, Ernst Hirsch Ballin, Ed van Thijn and Sigrid Kaag.

== House of Representatives ==
| Date | First submitter | Reason | Target | Votes in favour | Votes against | Ref. |
|---|---|---|---|---|---|---|
| 2 April 2025 | Stephan van Baarle (Denk) | | Schoof cabinet | 11 | 139 | |
| 2 April 2025 | Esther Ouwehand (PvdD) | | Dick Schoof (prime minister) | 11 | 139 | |
| 2 April 2025 | Frans Timmermans (GL-PvdA) | | Marjolein Faber (minister of Asylum and Migration) | 55 | 95 | |
| 20 February 2025 | Esther Ouwehand (PvdD) | | Femke Wiersma (minister of Agriculture, Fisheries, Food Security and Nature) | 6 | 144 | |
| 19 December 2024 | Michiel van Nispen (SP) | | Marjolein Faber (minister of Asylum and Migration) | 38 | 112 | |
| 25 November 2024 | Doğukan Ergin (DENK) | | Jurgen Nobel (state secretary for Participation and Integration) | 6 | 141 | |
| 10 October 2024 | Ismail el Abassi (DENK) | | Chris Jansen (state secretary for Public Transport and the Environment) | 6 | 144 | |
| 10 October 2024 | Ismail el Abassi (DENK) | | Barry Madlener (minister of Infrastructure and Water Management) | 6 | 144 | |
| 19 September 2024 | Stephan van Baarle (DENK) | | Schoof cabinet | 6 | 144 | |
| 4 July 2024 | Frans Timmermans (GL-PvdA) | | Marjolein Faber (minister of Asylum and Migration) | 46 | 103 | |
| 4 July 2024 | Frans Timmermans (GL-PvdA) | | Reinette Klever (minister for Foreign Trade and Development) | 46 | 103 | |
| 4 July 2024 | Stephan van Baarle (DENK) | | Schoof cabinet | 6 | 144 | |
| 20 June 2024 | Jimmy Dijk (SP) | | Dilan Yeşilgöz (demissionary minister of Justice and Security) | 14 | 136 | |
| 21 May 2024 | Gideon van Meijeren (FvD) | | Conny Helder (minister for Long-term Care and Sport) | 3 | 147 | |
| 20 June 2023 | Fleur Agema (PVV) | | Ernst Kuipers (minister of Health, Welfare and Sport) | 40 | 109 | |
| 20 June 2023 | Fleur Agema (PVV) | | Conny Helder (minister for Long-term Care and Sports) | 40 | 109 | |
| 15 June 2023 | Wybren van Haga (Group Van Haga) | | Ernst Kuipers (minister of Health, Welfare and Sport) | 25 | 123 | |
| 7 June 2023 | Wybren van Haga (Group Van Haga) | | Fourth Rutte cabinet | 11 | 135 | |
| 7 June 2023 | Jesse Klaver (GroenLinks) | | Mark Rutte (prime minister) | 67 | 79 | |
| 23 May 2023 | Renske Leijten (SP) | | Fourth Rutte cabinet | 48 | 101 | |
| 20 April 2023 | Farid Azarkan (DENK) | | Dilan Yeşilgöz-Zegerius (minister of Justice and Security) | 12 | 135 | |
| 5 April 2023 | Jesse Klaver (GroenLinks) | | Fourth Rutte cabinet | 59 | 76 | |
| 26 January 2023 | Alexander Kops (PVV) | | Piet Adema (minister of Agriculture, Nature and Food Quality) | 38 | 111 | |
| 15 December 2022 | Léon de Jong (PVV) | | Carola Schouten (minister for Poverty Policy, Participation and Pensions) | 34 | 116 | |
| 17 November 2022 | Sietse Fritsma (PVV) | | Kajsa Ollongren (minister of Defence) | 15 | 125 | |
| 17 November 2022 | Gideon van Meijeren (FvD) | | Dilan Yeşilgöz-Zegerius (minister of Justice and Security) | 8 | 142 | |
| 3 November 2022 | Caroline van der Plas (BBB) | | Christianne van der Wal (minister for Nature and Nitrogen Policy) | 29 | 118 | |
| 22 September 2022 | Geert Wilders (PVV) | | Fourth Rutte cabinet | 38 | 111 | |
| 15 September 2022 | Wybren van Haga (Group Van Haga) | | Franc Weerwind (minister for Legal Protection) | 25 | 125 | |
| 23 August 2022 | Geert Wilders (PVV) | Stikstofcrisis | Fourth Rutte cabinet | 41 | 109 | |
| 7 July 2022 | Joost Eerdmans (JA21) | | Eric van der Burg (state secretary for Justice and Security) | 28 | 122 | |
| 5 July 2022 | Geert Wilders (PVV) | | Fourth Rutte cabinet | 40 | 110 | |
| 30 June 2022 | Frederik Jansen (FvD) | | Fourth Rutte cabinet | 26 | 124 | |
| 23 June 2022 | Geert Wilders (PVV) | | Fourth Rutte cabinet | 28 | 111 | |
| 19 May 2022 | Geert Wilders (PVV) | | Mark Rutte (prime minister) | 47 | 100 | |
| 7 April 2022 | Attje Kuiken (PvdA) | | Hugo de Jonge (minister for Housing and Spatial Planning) | 52 | 72 | |
| 16 February 2022 | Wybren van Haga (Group Van Haga) | | Fourth Rutte cabinet | 25 | 125 | |
| 16 February 2022 | Sylvana Simons (BIJ1) | | Fourth Rutte cabinet | 21 | 129 | |
| 19 January 2022 | Geert Wilders (PVV) | | Fourth Rutte cabinet | 22 | 127 | |
| 3 November 2021 | Wybren van Haga (Group Van Haga) | | Third Rutte cabinet (already demissionary) | 34 | 115 | |
| 3 November 2021 | Sylvana Simons (BIJ1) | | Mark Rutte (demissionary prime minister) | 9 | 140 | |
| 3 November 2021 | Sylvana Simons (BIJ1) | | Hugo de Jonge (demissionary minister of Health, Welfare and Sport) | 9 | 140 | |
| 6 October 2021 | Jasper van Dijk (SP) | | Ankie Broekers-Knol (demissionary state secretary for Justice and Security) | 41 | 108 | |
| 23 September 2021 | Wybren van Haga (Group Van Haga) | | Hugo de Jonge (demissionary minister of Health, Welfare and Sport) | 25 | 125 | |
| 16 September 2021 | Jasper van Dijk (SP) | | Sigrid Kaag (demissionary minister of Foreign Affairs) | 42 | 108 | |
| 14 July 2021 | Wybren van Haga (Group Van Haga) | | Hugo de Jonge (demissionary minister of Health, Welfare and Sport) | 26 | 123 | |
| 29 April 2021 | Farid Azarkan (DENK) | Toeslagenaffaire | Third Rutte cabinet (already demissionary) | 40 | 93 | |
| 1 April 2021 | Geert Wilders (PVV) | 2021-2022 Dutch cabinet formation | Mark Rutte (demissionary prime minister) | 72 | 77 | |
| 5 January 2021 | Geert Wilders (PVV) | | Hugo de Jonge (minister of Health, Welfare and Sport) | 26 | 123 | |
| 15 December 2020 | Wybren van Haga (FvD) | | Third Rutte cabinet | 22 | 127 | |
| 28 October 2020 | Geert Wilders (PVV) | | Mark Rutte (prime minister) | 39 | 111 | |
| 9 September 2020 | Geert Wilders (PVV) | | Mark Rutte (prime minister) | 24 | 126 | |
| 2 September 2020 | Thierry Baudet (FvD) | | Ferdinand Grapperhaus (minister of Justice and Security) | 25 | 125 | |
| 14 July 2020 | Geert Wilders (PVV) | | Mark Rutte (prime minister) | 20 | 89 | |
| 11 June 2020 | Henk Krol [Group Krol/van Kooten-Arissen) | | Barbara Visser (state secretary for Defence) | 22 | 128 | |
| 14 May 2020 | Sadet Karabulut (SP) | | Ank Bijleveld (minister for Defence) | 49 | 101 | |
| 4 December 2019 | Renske Leijten (SP) | | Menno Snel (state secretary for Finance) | 46 | 85 | |
| 27 November 2019 | Lilian Marijnissen (SP) | | Ank Bijleveld (minister for Defence) | 48 | 102 | |
| 27 November 2019 | Lilian Marijnissen (SP) | | Mark Rutte (prime minister) | 48 | 102 | |
| 27 November 2019 | Lilian Marijnissen (SP) | | Third Rutte cabinet | 48 | 102 | |
| 14 November 2019 | Geert Wilders (PVV) | | Third Rutte cabinet | 21 | 128 | |
| 5 November 2019 | Isabelle Diks (GL) | | Ank Bijleveld (minister of Defence) | 70 | 79 | |
| 19 September 2019 | Geert Wilders (PVV) | | Mark Rutte (prime minister) | 19 | 124 | |
| 11 June 2019 | Esther Ouwehand (PvdD) | | Carola Schouten (minister of Agriculture, Nature and Food Quality) | 5 | 145 | |
| 5 June 2019 | Geert Wilders (PVV) | | Mark Rutte (prime minister) | 28 | 122 | |
| 3 April 2019 | Gidi Markuszower (PVV) | | Sander Dekker (minister for Legal Protection) | 23 | 127 | |
| 21 February 2019 | Barry Madlener (PVV) | | Carola Schouten (minister of Agriculture, Nature and Food Quality) | 20 | 130 | |
| 14 February 2019 | Henk van Gerven (SP) | | Bruno Bruins (minister for Medical Care and Sport) | 42 | 108 | |
| 30 January 2019 | Geert Wilders (PVV) | | Third Rutte cabinet | 22 | 128 | |
| 29 January 2019 | Sadet Karabulut (SP) | | Stef Blok (minister for Foreign Affairs) | 42 | 102 | |
| 4 December 2018 | Thierry Baudet (FvD) | | Third Rutte cabinet | 18 | 117 | |
| 31 October 2018 | Fleur Agema (PVV) | | Bruno Bruins (minister for Medical Care and Sport) | 48 | 102 | |
| 16 October 2018 | Geert Wilders (PVV) | | Mark Rutte (prime minister) | 49 | 93 | |
| 2 October 2018 | Sadet Karabulut (SP) | | Stef Blok (minister of Foreign Affairs) | 44 | 106 | |
| 5 September 2018 | Tunahan Kuzu (DENK) | | Stef Blok (minister of Foreign Affairs) | 45 | 105 | |
| 26 June 2018 | Geert Wilders (PVV) | | Mark Rutte (prime minister) | 37 | 104 | |
| 20 February 2018 | Thierry Baudet (FvD) | | Kajsa Ollongren (minister of the Interior and Kingdom Relations) | 23 | 93 | |
| 13 February 2018 | Geert Wilders (PVV) | | Mark Rutte (prime minister) | 43 | 101 | |
| 2 November 2017 | Geert Wilders (PVV) | | Kajsa Ollongren (minister of Interior and Kingdom Relations) | 22 | 128 | |
| 2 November 2017 | Geert Wilders (PVV) | | Barbara Visser (state secretary of Defence) | 22 | 128 | |
| 2 November 2017 | Geert Wilders (PVV) | | Ferdinand Grapperhaus (minister of Security and Justice) | 20 | 130 | |
| 20 December 2016 | Harm Beertema (PVV) | | Mark Rutte (prime minister) | 33 | 117 | |
| 7 December 2016 | Selçuk Öztürk (Group Kuzu/Öztürk) | | Lodewijk Asscher (minister of Social Affairs and Employment) | 2 | 148 | |
| 8 November 2016 | Louis Bontes (Group Bontes/Van Klaveren) | | Second Rutte cabinet | 16 | 123 | |
| 5 July 2016 | Louis Bontes (Group Bontes/Van Klaveren) | | Mark Rutte (prime minister) | 32 | 118 | |
| 13 April 2016 | Geert Wilders (PVV) | | Mark Rutte (prime minister) | 14 | 136 | |
| 7 April 2016 | Geert Wilders (PVV) | | Ard van der Steur (minister of Security and Justice) | 38 | 112 | |
| 20 January 2016 | Michiel van Nispen (SP) | | Ard van der Steur (minister of Security and Justice) | 32 | 117 | |
| 19 November 2015 | Geert Wilders (PVV) | | Second Rutte cabinet | 14 | 136 | |
| 14 October 2015 | Geert Wilders (PVV) | | Second Rutte cabinet | 14 | 136 | |
| 29 September 2015 | Barry Madlener (PVV) | | Wilma Mansveld (state secretary of Infrastructure and the Environment) | 12 | 138 | |
| 10 September 2015 | Joram van Klaveren (Group Bontes/Van Klaveren) | | Second Rutte cabinet | 14 | 135 | |
| 19 August 2015 | Geert Wilders (PVV) | | Second Rutte cabinet | 13 | 120 | |
| 4 June 2015 | Renske Leijten (SP) | | Martin van Rijn (state secretary of Health, Welfare and Sport) | 49 | 101 | |
| 26 March 2015 | Renske Leijten (SP) | | Martin van Rijn (state secretary of Health, Welfare and Sport) | 30 | 118 | |
| 3 March 2015 | Esther Ouwehand (PvdD) | | Second Rutte cabinet | 11 | 101 | |
| 26 November 2014 | Louis Bontes (Group Bontes/Van Klaveren) | | Ivo Opstelten (minister of Security and Justice) | 2 | 148 | |
| 26 November 2014 | Lilian Helder (PVV) | | Ivo Opstelten (minister of Security and Justice) | 14 | 136 | |
| 13 November 2014 | Tony van Dijck (PVV) | | Second Rutte cabinet | 14 | 136 | |
| 18 September 2014 | Geert Wilders (PVV) | | Second Rutte cabinet | 12 | 138 | |
| 15 May 2014 | Sietse Fritsma (PVV) | | Fred Teeven (state secretary of Security and Justice) | 12 | 117 | |
| 11 February 2014 | Alexander Pechtold (D66) | | Ronald Plasterk (minister of Interior and Kingdom Relations) | 63 | 87 | |
| 25 September 2013 | Geert Wilders (PVV) | | Second Rutte cabinet | 31 | 113 | |
| 23 May 2013 | Reinette Klever (PVV) | | Edith Schippers (minister of Health, Welfare and Sport) | 30 | 120 | |
| 14 May 2013 | Pieter Omtzigt (CDA) | | Frans Weekers (state secretary of Finance) | 63 | 87 | |
| 18 April 2013 | Sharon Gesthuizen (SP) | | Fred Teeven (state secretary of Security and Justice) | 48 | 96 | |
| 27 February 2013 | Barry Madlener (PVV) | | Mark Rutte (prime minister) | 14 | 128 | |
| 22 January 2013 | Tony van Dijck (PVV) | | Jeroen Dijsselbloem (minister of Finance) | 15 | 135 | |
| 14 November 2012 | Geert Wilders (PVV) | | Second Rutte cabinet | 15 | 135 | |
| 5 July 2012 | Marianne Thieme (PvdD) | | Edith Schippers (demissionary minister of Health, Welfare and Sport) | 2 | 148 | |
| 5 July 2012 | Marianne Thieme (PvdD) | | Henk Bleker (demissionary state secretary of Economic Affairs, Agriculture and Innovation) | 2 | 148 | |
| 24 May 2012 | Geert Wilders (PVV) | | Jan Kees de Jager (demissionary minister of Finance) | 24 | 123 | |
| 27 March 2012 | Renske Leijten (SP) | | Edith Schippers (minister of Health, Welfare and Sport) | 57 | 93 | |
| 14 December 2011 | Marianne Thieme (PvdD) | | Henk Bleker (state secretary of Economic Affairs, Agriculture and Innovation) | 2 | 148 | |
| 16 February 2010 | Femke Halsema (GL) | | Jan Peter Balkenende (prime minister) | 40 | 96 | |
| 4 November 2009 | Rita Verdonk (Lid-Verdonk) | | Ernst Hirsch Ballin (minister of Justice) | 1 | 147 | |
| 23 September 2009 | Raymond de Roon (PVV) | | Ernst Hirsch Ballin (minister of Justice) | 10 | 140 | |
| 17 September 2009 | Geert Wilders (PVV) | | Fourth Balkenende cabinet | 9 | 141 | |
| 17 September 2009 | Mark Rutte (VVD) | | Fourth Balkenende cabinet | 55 | 95 | |
| 22 March 2009 | Rita Verdonk (Lid-Verdonk) | | Fourth Balkenende cabinet | 1 | 140 | |
| 20 March 2009 | Geert Wilders (PVV) | | Jan Peter Balkenende (prime minister) | 9 | 141 | |
| 20 March 2009 | Geert Wilders (PVV) | | Maxime Verhagen (minister of Foreign Affairs) | 9 | 141 | |
| 22 January 2009 | Rita Verdonk (Lid-Verdonk) | | Eimert van Middelkoop (minister of Defence) | 10 | 140 | |
| 6 November 2008 | Paulus Jansen (SP) | | Ella Vogelaar (minister for Housing, Communities and Integration) | 35 | 115 | |
| 18 September 2008 | Geert Wilders (PVV) | | Fourth Balkenende cabinet | 9 | 141 | |
| 2 September 2008 | Barry Madlener (PVV) | | Jacqueline Cramer (minister of Housing, Spatial Planning and the Environment) | 9 | 141 | |
| 24 April 2008 | Henk Kamp (VVD) | | Nebahat Albayrak (state secretary of Justice) | | | |
| 17 April 2008 | | OV-chipkaart | Tineke Huizinga (state secretary of Transport and Water Management) | | | |
| 1 April 2008 | Geert Wilders (PVV) | | Fourth Balkenende cabinet | | | |
| 7 September 2007 | Geert Wilders (PVV) | | Ella Vogelaar (minister for Housing, Communities and Integration) | | | |
| 1 March 2007 | Geert Wilders (PVV) | | Nebahat Albayrak (state secretary of Justice) | | | |
| 1 March 2007 | Geert Wilders (PVV) | | Ahmed Aboutaleb (state secretary of Social Affairs and Employment) | | | |
| 15 September 2005 | | | Piet Hein Donner (minister of Justice) | | | |
| 17 June 2005 | Joost Eerdmans (LPF) | | Piet Hein Donner (minister of Justice) | | | |
| 2 June 2005 | Geert Wilders (Group Wilders) | | Second Balkenende cabinet | | | |
| 12 November 2004 | Geert Wilders (Group Wilders) | Assassination Of Theo Van Gogh | Johan Remkes (minister of Interior and Kingdom Relations) | | | |
| 11 December 2002 | Jan Marijnissen (SP) | | Hilbrand Nawijn (demissionary minister for Integration and Asylum Affairs) | 44 | 81 | |
| 21 June 2002 | Ferry Hoogendijk (LPF) | | Klaas de Vries (demissionary minister of Interior and Kingdom Relations) | | | |
| 23 January 2002 | Jan Peter Balkenende (CDA) | | Benk Korthals (minister of Justice) | | | |
| 9 April 1969 | Joop den Uyl (PvdA) | | Leo de Block (minister of Economic Affairs) | | | |
| 23 January 1951 | Pieter Oud (VVD) | | First Drees cabinet | 33 | 59 | |
| 25 July 1939 | Laurentius Nicolaas Deckers (RKSP) | June-July 1939 Dutch cabinet formation | Fifth Colijn cabinet | | | |
