= Tjitske Siderius =

Dutch politician

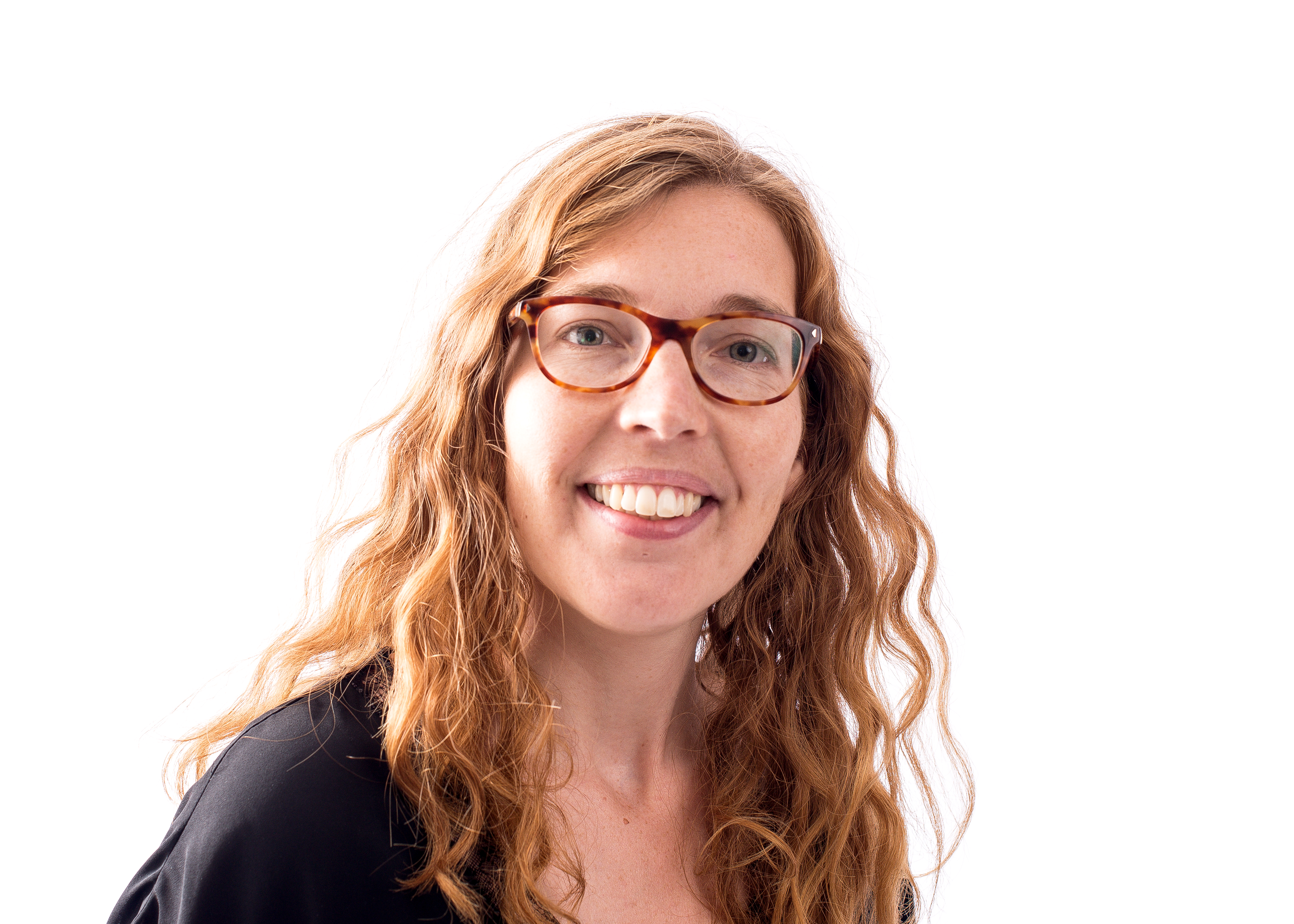

Member of the House of Representatives of the Netherlands
- In office 3 September 2013 – 26 November 2013; 6 February 2014 – 23 March 2017

Personal details
- Born: 24 September 1981 (age 44) Groenlo, Netherlands
- Party: Socialist Party (2003–2017); Labour Party (since 2017)

Tjitske Siderius (born 24 September 1981) is a Dutch politician.

== Education ==
Siderius studied management, economy and law at HU University of Applied Sciences Utrecht until 2001, she continued studying at Windesheim University of Applied Sciences on the topic of personnel and work between 2001 and 2005.

== Political career ==
Siderius had been a staff employee for the Socialist Party fraction in the House of Representatives before she became a temporary member of the House herself. She was member of the municipal council of Zwolle between March 2006 and September 2014.

During the 2012 general election Siderius was number 18 on the Socialist Party list and received over 3000 votes. The Socialist Party conquered 15 seats and as a consequence Siderius was not elected.

Siderius was a member of the House of Representatives of the Netherlands for the Socialist Party between 3 September 2013 and 26 November 2013, temporarily replacing Sadet Karabulut, who went on maternity leave.

From 6 February 2014 Siderius temporarily replaced Renske Leijten who went on maternity leave. When Paulus Jansen resigned in April 2014, Siderius became his permanent replacement on 14 May 2014. Henri Swinkels then became the temporary replacement for Leijten. Her term in the House ended on 23 March 2017.

On 11 July 2022 Siderius became alderman in the municipal executive of city of Hattem in the province of Gelderland for the combined list GroenLinks–PvdA.

== Personal life ==
Siderius is a member of the Dutch Reformed Churches.
