= Motion of no confidence =

Type of motion and vote in a legislative body

In a deliberative assembly, a motion of no confidence is a motion declaring that a government or an officer, typically a government executive, is not fit to hold office. A vote on such a motion is a vote of no confidence; the corresponding inverses are a motion and vote of confidence. The no-confidence vote is a defining constitutional element of a parliamentary system (and derivatives such as the semi-presidential system), in which the mandate of the government or its officers relies on the continued support, or at least non-opposition, of the majority in the legislature. Systems differ in whether the motion may be directed against the prime minister, the government as a whole (whether majority, minority or coalition), individual cabinet ministers, the cabinet as a whole, or some combination of these. Sometimes a president can also be subject to a no confidence vote, specially when the office was elected by the legislature.

A censure motion is different from a no-confidence motion. In a parliamentary system, a vote of no confidence leads to the resignation of the prime minister and cabinet, or, depending on the constitutional procedure at hand, a snap election to potentially replace the government.

A vote in favour of censure is a non-constitutionally-binding expression of disapproval; a motion of censure may be against an individual minister or a group of ministers. Depending on a country's constitution, a no-confidence motion may be directed against the entire cabinet. Depending on the applicable rules, a mover of a censure motion may need to state the reasons for the motion, but specific reasons may not be required for no-confidence motions. However, in some countries, especially those with uncodified constitutions, what constitutes a no-confidence vote sufficient to force the resignation of high officeholders may not be clear. Even if the government is not constitutionally bound to resign after losing a given vote, such a result may be taken as an ominous sign for the government and may prompt its resignation or the calling of a snap election.

In addition to explicit motions of confidence and no-confidence, some bills (almost always the government budget and sometimes other key pieces of legislation) may be declared to be a confidence vote – that is, the vote on the bill is treated as a question of confidence in the government; a defeat of the bill expresses no confidence in the government and may cause the resignation of the prime minister and cabinet or the calling of an election.

== Parliamentary systems ==
There are a number of variations in this procedure between parliaments. In some countries, a motion of no confidence can be directed at the government collectively or at any individual member, including the prime minister. Sometimes, motions of confidence or no confidence are proposed even though it is clear that the government does in fact have majority support simply to pressure ministers or put opposition parties in the potentially embarrassing situation of voting in support of the government.

In many parliamentary democracies, there are limits to how often a confidence vote may be held, such as being allowed only once every three or six months. Thus, the timing of a motion of no confidence is a matter of political judgment. A motion of no confidence on a relatively trivial matter may then prove counterproductive if an issue suddenly arises that is seen to be a more credible justification for a motion of no confidence.

Sometimes, the government chooses to declare that one of its bills is a "vote of confidence" to prevent dissident members of its own party from voting against it. However, this is a political risk, especially when the prime minister's majority is not assured, such as if the ruling party/coalition is internally divided, or in minority government; if the bill fails (and thus it is shown that parliament has lost its confidence in the government), the prime minister is expected to resign or call snap elections. In Westminster systems, the government budget is always a vote of confidence; even a successful amendment to the budget may be considered a no-confidence vote.

It is not necessarily the case that a vote with the effect of a motion of no confidence be introduced as such. As stated above, certain pieces of legislation may be treated as confidence issues. In some cases, the motion may be an ordinary legislative or procedural matter of little substantive importance used for the purpose of testing the government's majority, such as the 1895 vote of no confidence in the Earl of Rosebery's government, which was technically a motion to reduce the salary of a minister by a nominal sum.

=== Australia ===
In the Australian Parliament, a motion of no confidence requires a majority of the members present in the House of Representatives to agree to it. The House of Representatives has 150 members and so requires 76 votes in favour of the motion when all members of the House are present. A straight vote of no confidence in the Australian government and a motion or amendment censuring a government have never been successful in the House of Representatives. However, governments have on eight occasions resigned or advised a dissolution after their defeat on other questions before the House. The last time that a government resigned after being defeated in the House came in October 1941, when the House rejected the budget of Arthur Fadden's minority government.

Specific motions of no confidence or censure against the prime minister, ministers, the leader of the opposition, senators and leaders of political parties have been successful on some occasions. Motions of no confidence against the government may be passed in the Senate but have little or no impact in the House. However, the Senate's right to refuse supply helped spark the 1975 Australian constitutional crisis.

=== Bangladesh ===
In the Parliament of Bangladesh, there is no provision to hold motions of no confidence, as a result of Article 70 of the Constitution of Bangladesh, which prohibits members of Parliament from voting against their party and made the removal of a sitting government unattainable.

=== Canada ===
In Canada, a vote of no confidence is a motion that the House of Commons (federal) or legislative assembly (provincial) no longer has confidence in the incumbent government. A no-confidence motion may be directed against only the incumbent government, with confidence motions against the Official Opposition being inadmissible. Originating as a constitutional convention, it remains an uncodified practice which is not outlined in any standing orders for the House of Commons.

In the House of Commons, a member of parliament may introduce a motion that explicitly states the House has no confidence in the incumbent government. In addition to explicit motions of no confidence, several other motions and bills are also considered implicit motions of confidence, and a vote of no confidence may be asserted automatically if such a bill fails to pass. Bills and motions that are considered implicit motions of confidence include appropriations or supply bills, motions concerning budgetary policy, and the Address in Reply to the Speech from the Throne. The government may also declare any bill or motion to be a question of confidence. Although the failure to pass those bills and motions can serve as an implicit expression of a vote of no confidence, the opposition is not required to formally present this failure as a motion of no-confidence against the government.

If a vote of no confidence passes, the prime minister is required to either resign or request the governor-general to dissolve parliament and call a general election. The governor-general may refuse a request for dissolution if an election has recently been held or there is another leader who can likely gain the confidence of the House. If a dissolution request is refused, the prime minister must resign, and the governor-general invites the leader of another coalition/party to form a new government. Six motions of no confidence have been passed in the House of Commons: in 1926, 1963, 1974, 1979, 2005, and 2011. All successful votes of no confidence in the 20th century were the result of a loss of supply; votes of no confidence in 2005 and 2011 were the result of explicit confidence motions presented by the opposition.

In 1968, the standing orders respecting supply were amended to limit opposition to two confidence motions on a given opposition day in each of the three supply periods. This provision was repealed in June 1985.

In 1984, a proposal was made to consider the election of speaker to not be a matter of confidence. This was passed in 1985 and is now part of the standing orders.

The confidence convention is also present in the provincial legislatures of Canada, operating much like their federal counterpart. However, the decision to dissolve the legislature and call an election or to see if another coalition/party can form a government is left to the provincial lieutenant-governor.

Two Canadian territories, the Northwest Territories and Nunavut, operate as a consensus government system in which the premier is chosen by the members of the nonpartisan legislature. If a vote of no confidence against the incumbent government passes, the premier and the cabinet are removed from office, and the legislature elects a new premier. In a consensus government, confidence motions may be directed against any individual ministers holding office as they are also nominated by members of the legislature.

=== Czech Republic ===
The Constitution of the Czech Republic provides for a government responsible to the Chamber of Deputies (the lower chamber of the Czech parliament). Any new government, appointed after the demise of previous one, must—no more than 30 days after being appointed by the president of the republic—request a motion of confidence vote from the Chamber of Deputies. The motion of confidence is passed if more deputies vote for the government than against it. Otherwise, the government must resign and the president can appoint a new government. If this government also fails to gain confidence, then the President of the republic must appoint a prime minister proposed by the president of the Chamber of Deputies. If this government still fails to gain confidence of the Chamber, then the president of the republic may choose either to again appoint a prime minister of his choice (the government still need to pass motion of confidence) or to order the dissolution of the Chamber of Deputies and set new elections.

The government can at any time ask the Chamber of Deputies for a vote of confidence. The government can also connect voting on a government-sponsored bill with a request for a vote of confidence. If the bill fails to pass in Chamber of Deputies it is equivalent to a lost vote of confidence. In this case, the Chamber has to vote on the proposed bill within three months of its submission (otherwise the president of the republic can dissolve it).

The Chamber of Deputies may itself start debate on a vote of no confidence in the government, but only if it has been submitted in writing by at least fifty Deputies. To adopt the resolution, an absolute majority of all Deputies have to vote against the government.

=== Denmark ===
Paragraph 15 of the Danish Constitution states that "A Minister shall not remain in office after the Folketing has passed a vote of no confidence in him" and that "When the Folketing passes a vote of no confidence in the Prime Minister, he shall ask for the dismissal of the Ministry unless writs are to be issued for a general election." The vote requires a simple majority.

Votes of no confidence against the government are rare in Denmark, only occurring in 1909, 1947 and 1975. Generally the government will resign or call for an election before a vote of no confidence.

=== European Union ===
The European Parliament can dismiss the European Commission, the executive body of the European Union, through a successful motion of no confidence, which requires a two-thirds majority vote. A successful vote on the motion leads to the resignation of the entire Commission. In 1999, the Commission resigned when it appeared certain that such a motion of no confidence would be adopted the following day.

=== Germany ===
In Germany, a vote of no confidence in the federal chancellor requires the opposition, on the same ballot, to propose a candidate of its own whom it wants the federal president to appoint as its successor. Thus, a motion of no confidence may be brought forward only if there is a positive majority for the new candidate. The idea was to prevent the state crises that occurred near the end of the German Weimar Republic. Frequently, chancellors were then turned out of the office without their successors having enough parliamentary support to govern. Unlike the British system, chancellors do not have to resign in response to the failure of a vote of confidence if it has been initiated by them, rather than by the parliamentary opposition, but they may ask the president to call general elections, a request that the president decides on whether to fulfil.

=== Greece ===
The Parliament may, by its decision, withdraw its confidence from the Government or from a member of it. A motion of no confidence can only be submitted six months after the Parliament has rejected a previous one. The motion must be signed by at least one-sixth of the members and must clearly state the issues to be debated. A motion of no confidence is accepted only if it is approved by the absolute majority of the total number of members.

=== India ===
In India, a motion of no confidence can be introduced only in the Lok Sabha (the lower house of the Parliament of India) and after at least 50 Lok Sabha members support it, the Speaker may grant a leave and after considering the state of business in the House, allot a day or days or part of a day for the discussion of the motion (under sub-rule (2) and (3) of rule 198 of Lok Sabha Rules, 16th edition). If the motion carries, the House debates and votes on the motion. If a majority of the members vote in favour of the motion, it is passed, and all the ministers are expected to resign on their moral grounds.

J. B. Kripalani moved the first-ever no-confidence motion on the floor of the Lok Sabha against the government of prime minister Jawaharlal Nehru in August 1963, immediately after the disastrous Sino-Indian War. As of August 2023, 31 no-confidence motions have been moved. Prime Minister Indira Gandhi faced the most no-confidence motions (15), followed by Lal Bahadur Shastri and P. V. Narasimha Rao (three each), Morarji Desai and Narendra Modi (two each), and Jawaharlal Nehru, Rajiv Gandhi, V. P. Singh, H. D. Deve Gowda, Atal Bihari Vajpayee, and Manmohan Singh (one each). Prime Minister Vajpayee lost the no-confidence motion by a margin of one vote (269–270) on 17 April 1999. Prime Minister Desai resigned on 12 July 1979 after being defeated in a vote of no-confidence, V. P. Singh and H. D. Deve Gowda were also removed in no-confidence motion. The two most recent no-confidence motions were brought against the Narendra Modi government, in 2018 and in 2023(due to the ethnic violence in the state of Manipur), both of which were failed in the Lok Sabha.

Even after the Anti-Defection Law, when the majority party has an absolute majority and it can whip party members to vote in favour of the government; still it is possible to remove the government by a no-confidence motion if the ruling party breaks by more than two thirds.

=== Ireland ===
In Ireland, if a motion of no confidence in the Taoiseach or the government of Ireland is passed by Dáil Éireann, then the Taoiseach may request that the President dissolve the Dáil and call a general election. Whether or not to grant this request is at the discretion of the President, though no President has ever refused a request for dissolution. Should the President refuse to dissolve the Dáil, the Taoiseach and government must resign.

=== Israel ===
The motion of no confidence is outlined in Israeli Basic Law Article 28 and Article 44 of the Knesset's Rule of Procedure.

Despite often tabling motions of no confidence in the Knesset, opposition parties have only ever toppled a sitting government once, that being when Labor Party leader Shimon Peres attempted to form a government of left-wing factions and ultra-orthodox parties, in a scandal known as the dirty trick, to replace the national unity government of Likud's Yitzhak Shamir. However, despite securing the non-confidence motion, Shamir managed to stay on as prime minister for the remainder of the 12th Knesset.

=== Italy ===
In Italy, the government requires the support of both houses of Parliament. Within ten days of the government's formation, a confidence motion must be passed. Five governments were forced to resign when a motion of confidence in them failed to pass in one of the houses of Parliament: the eighth De Gasperi cabinet in 1953, the first Fanfani cabinet in 1954, the first Andreotti cabinet in 1972, the fifth Andreotti cabinet in 1979 and the seventh Fanfani cabinet in 1987.

Parliament can withdraw its support to the government through a vote of no confidence. A vote of no confidence may be proposed if a tenth of the members of either house sign the proposition and within three days before the appointed date, the vote can be brought into the discussion.

Since the drafting of the Constitution of Italy, Parliament has not passed any no confidence motion against the whole cabinet, as government crises often ended with prime ministers resigning after becoming aware the majority of parliament did not support them anymore, before a no confidence motion could be put to vote or even before such a motion was presented. The only time this instrument was used was in October 1995, when the minister of justice Filippo Mancuso was forced to resign after a vote of no confidence against him passed in the Senate. The subsequent Constitutional Court sentence in 1996 declared it was indeed possible to propose an individual vote of no confidence against a single minister, instead of the whole government, and that as such, the motion Mancuso was legitimate.

Summary of the vote of no confidence in Minister of Justice Filippo Mancuso, 1995
| Parties | Votes | % |
|---|---|---|
| Ayes | 173 | 94.02 |
| Nays | 3 | 1.63 |
| Abstentions | 8 | 4.34 |

The government can also make any vote a matter of confidence. In the entire history of the Republic of Italy, only two governments were forced to resign when a vote they had made a matter of confidence failed: the first Prodi cabinet in 1996, and the second Prodi cabinet in 2006. In both cases, the vote made a matter of confidence was a vote on a resolution approving the prime minister's address to one of the houses of Parliament.

=== Japan ===
Article 69 of the 1947 Constitution of Japan provides that "if the House of Representatives passes a non-confidence resolution, or rejects a confidence resolution, the Cabinet shall resign en masse, unless the House of Representatives is dissolved within ten (10) days."

Since the Japanese political system has been dominated by the right-wing Liberal Democratic Party for all but 6 years since 1955, either in majority governments or coalitions with Komeito, non-confidence votes in the government have been rare. Yet, two governments, those of Prime Ministers Masayoshi Ōhira and Kiichi Miyazawa were brought down after significant portions of their own party turned against them.

=== Malaysia ===
In Malaysia's federal political system, votes of confidence in state legislative assemblies of Malaysia have removed its heads of state governments four times, the most recent being Faizal Azumu's Perak ministry in 2020. During the 2020–2022 Malaysian political crisis, opposition members of Parliament demanded a vote of confidence in Prime Minister Muhyiddin Yassin, but he resigned before this could take place. After the 2022 Malaysian general election, in order to quell the scepticism on Anwar Ibrahim's legitimacy as prime minister, Anwar's government tabled a motion of confidence in the Dewan Rakyat on 19 December 2022, which was passed by a voice vote on the same day, thereby solidifying his position as prime minister.

=== Pakistan ===
The Constitution of Pakistan has provision for a no-confidence motion in all constituents of the Electoral College of the state. The motions can target speakers and deputy speakers of provincial and national assemblies, the prime minister, chief ministers of provinces, as well as the chairman and deputy chairman of Senate. Before it can be put for a vote on the pertinent house's floor, it must have the backing of at least 20% of the elected members in all cases except those moved against speakers or deputy speakers in which case there is no minimum. After being put to vote, the motion is deemed to be successful only if passed by a majority.

The no-confidence procedure has historically been mostly used to remove speakers and deputy speakers. Of the 11 times that the motion has been invoked, nine cases targeted those posts, with four being effective. Votes of no confidence in prime ministers are extremely rare. In November 1989, Benazir Bhutto faced an ultimately unsuccessful motion of no confidence by Ghulam Mustafa Jatoi. Same is the case for provincial chief ministers, as the only instance of its use is the one moved in January 2018 against Sanaullah Zehri, the chief minister of Balochistan, who resigned before the vote could take place.

Since gaining independence in 1947, only Imran Khan was successfully removed as prime minister through a motion of no confidence in 2022. An earlier attempt led by the opposition was dismissed by the deputy speaker Qasim Suri using Article 5 of the constitution. Later on, President Arif Alvi dissolved the National Assembly immediately after receiving advice from Prime Minister Khan to do so, causing a constitutional crisis. On 7 April 2022, the Supreme Court of Pakistan ruled that the dismissal of the no-confidence motion, the prorogation of the National Assembly, advice of Khan to president Arif Alvi to dissolve the National Assembly and subsequent dissolution of the National Assembly were unconstitutional, and overturned these actions. On 10 April 2022, the reconvened National Assembly passed the motion of no confidence against Khan by a majority vote of 172, being the first successful ousting through no–confidence motion.

=== Peru ===
In Peru, both the legislative and the executive branches have the power to bring a motion of no confidence against acting legal members of the other branch. The president of the Cabinet may propose a motion of no confidence against any minister to Congress, which then needs more than half the Congress to approve it. The president of the republic may dissolve Congress if it has censured or denied its confidence to two Cabinets. The relevant Articles 132–134 are in the 1993 version of the Constitution of Peru.

During the 2019 Peruvian constitutional crisis, President Martín Vizcarra enacted a constitutional process on 29 May 2019 to create a motion of no confidence towards Congress if it refused to co-operate with his proposed actions against corruption. Pedro Castillo also motioned to use this mechanism against Congress in 2022 when he attempted to dissolve the legislative body. The Congressionally-appointed Constitutional Court of Peru, during the presidency of Castillo, would rule that only Congress could interpret whether or not a motion of confidence has been made.

=== Poland ===
The Constitution of Poland (1997) provides for government responsible to the Sejm (lower chamber of the Parliament of Poland). The President of the Republic has no more than 14 days after the dismissal of the old government or after the first sitting of the newly elected Sejm, to appoint a prime minister and on his recommendation other members of the government (prime minister has to submit resignation of the current sitting government at first sitting of the newly elected Sejm). 14 days after being appointed by the president, the government has to present their programme to the Sejm and ask for a motion requiring a vote of confidence. Motion is passed if more present Sejm deputies vote for the new government than against it. At least half of all Deputies have to be present. If the government fails to pass the vote of confidence (or if the president failed to appoint a new government in time) then the President of Sejm nominates a prime minister and government which has to also pass the vote of confidence. If the vote of confidence was successful, the president of the republic has to formally appoint this government. Otherwise the president may nominate members of the government as in the first instance. If even this time government fails to pass the vote of confidence, then the President of the Republic has to call a new parliamentary election.

Prime minister can ask the Sejm for a vote of confidence.

Government as whole but also individual ministers (for their ministry) are responsible to the Sejm. Sejm can by constructive vote of no confidence replace the prime minister and the current sitting government. In order for a motion of no confidence to pass and remove the government the Sejm has to vote for a new prime minister with a majority of all of its Deputies. Vote of no confidence against the sitting government can only be called if it is requested by at least 46 Deputies and if it's called at least 3 months before the last motion was rejected. Exceptions apply for a motion requested by at least 115 Deputies.

The Sejm may also pass a vote of no confidence in an individual minister. This motion can be called if at least 69 Deputies requested it. Same voting procedure as for vote of no confidence of whole government apply. The President of the Republic has to recall a minister who failed to pass vote of no confidence.

=== Scotland ===
In the Scottish Parliament, a confidence motion requires the support of at least 25 MSPs in order to be voted on. Under the Scotland Act 1998, the passage of a successful confidence motion in the Scottish Government compels the resignation of all ministers. The Parliament then has 28 days to nominate a new First Minister before a general election would be called.

Motions can be lodged against individual ministers, the First Minister, or the government as a whole. There have been nine confidence motions voted on since the establishment of the Parliament in 1999, and none have been successful so far.

=== South Africa ===
Any member of Parliament in the National Assembly may request a motion of no confidence in either the Cabinet, excluding the president, or the president. The Speaker, within the rules of Parliament, must add such a motion to the order paper and give it a priority. If a motion of no confidence cannot be scheduled by the last sitting day of the annual sitting, it must be the first item on the order paper of the next sitting. In the event of a successful motion, the Speaker automatically assumes the position of acting president.

On 7 August 2017, Speaker Baleka Mbete announced that she would permit a motion of no confidence in Jacob Zuma's government to proceed in the National Assembly via secret ballot. It was the eighth motion to be brought against Zuma in his presidency and the first to be held via secret ballot. After the vote was held the next day, the motion was defeated 198–177, with 25 abstentions. Around 20 governing ANC members of Parliament voted in favour of the measure.

=== Spain ===
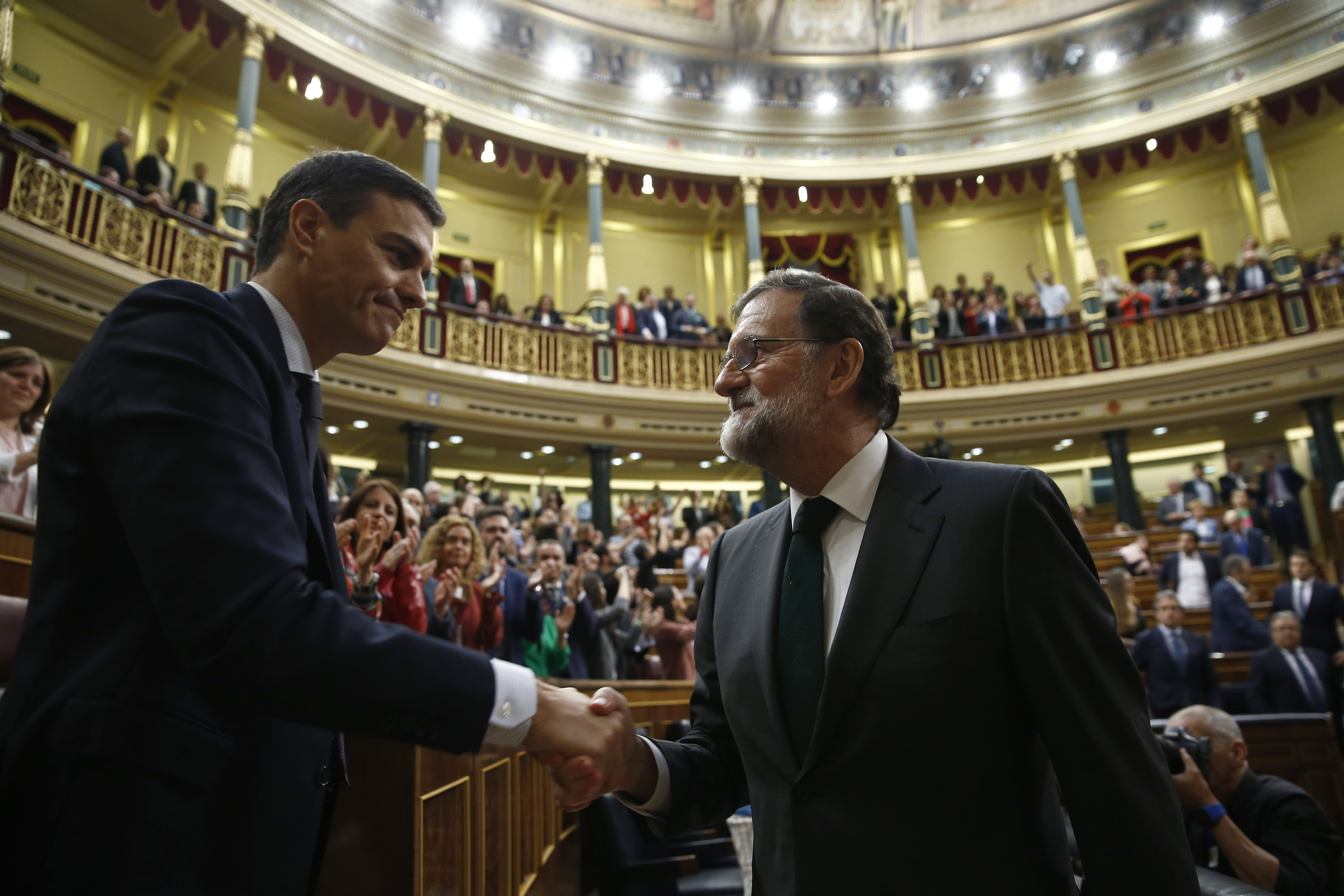
The outgoing prime minister Mariano Rajoy (right) congratulates the incoming prime minister Pedro Sánchez (left) upon losing the no-confidence vote on 1 June 2018.

The Spanish Constitution of 1978 provides for motions of no confidence to be proposed by one-tenth of the Congress of Deputies. Following the German model, votes of no confidence in Spain are constructive and so the motion must also include an alternative candidate for prime minister. For a motion of no confidence to be successful, it has to be carried by an absolute majority in the Congress of Deputies. At least five days must pass after the motion is registered before it can come up for a vote. Other parties may submit alternative motions within two days of the registration.

Also, the prime minister is barred from dissolving the Cortes Generales and calling a general election while a motion of no confidence is pending. If the motion is successful, the incumbent prime minister must resign. According to the Constitution, the replacement candidate named in the motion is automatically deemed to have the confidence of the Congress of Deputies and is immediately appointed as prime minister by the monarch. If the motion is unsuccessful, its signatories may not submit another motion during the same session.

The current prime minister, Pedro Sánchez, was sworn in on 2 June 2018 after a motion of no confidence against Mariano Rajoy had been approved on 1 June 2018.

=== Singapore ===
Under Article 25(1) of the Constitution of Singapore, the prime minister of Singapore must command the confidence of Parliament less NCMPs and NMPs. Since Singapore's independence on 9 August 1965, no Singaporean government has ever faced a motion of no confidence. However, Prime Minister Lee Kuan Yew faced three no-confidence motions in 1961, 1962 and 1963, all prior to independence.

The 1960s saw the ruling PAP split between the right wing led by Lee Kuan Yew and the left wing led by Lim Chin Siong. This caused PAP's massive majority to diminish. Lee Kuan Yew faced his first confidence vote on 20 July 1961 following the PAP's defeat in the Hong Lim and Anson by-elections. This motion was rather a motion of confidence tabled by the prime minister himself. All 51 assemblymen were present and voting. The prime minister won the vote by a margin of 27–8 votes. The results were as follows:

Summary of the Vote of Confidence in Lee Kuan Yew's Government, 1961
| Parties | Votes | % |
|---|---|---|
| Ayes | 8 | 15.69 |
| Nays | 27 | 52.94 |
| Abstentions | 16 | 31.37 |

However, among the 16 abstentions were 13 left wing PAP members, who were expelled from the PAP after the vote, and the 13 went on to form the Barisan Sosialis. On 13 July 1962, Barisan MP Lee Siew Choh tabled a motion of no confidence against Lee Kuan Yew. Three assemblymen were absent bringing the total membership of the Legislative Assembly to 48 present and voting. The Prime Minister won the vote by 24–16. Therefore, Lee Kuan Yew remained in office. The results for this motion of no confidence are as follows:

Summary of the Vote of No Confidence in Lee Kuan Yew's Government, 1962
| Parties | Votes | % |
|---|---|---|
| Ayes | 16 | 33.33 |
| Nays | 24 | 50.00 |
| Abstentions | 8 | 16.67 |

Lee Siew Choh tabled another motion of no confidence against Lee Kuan Yew's government on 15 June 1963 over issues regarding the proposed merger of Singapore into the Federation of Malaysia. Five members were absent from the Assembly and 1 seat was vacant bringing the total membership down to 45 present and voting. This time, Lee Kuan Yew's Government won the vote by a margin of 23–16. The results are as follows:

Summary of the Vote of No Confidence in Lee Kuan Yew's Government, 1963
| Parties | Votes | % |
|---|---|---|
| Ayes | 16 | 35.56 |
| Nays | 23 | 51.11 |
| Abstentions | 6 | 13.33 |

In September 1963, the Legislative Assembly was dissolved and fresh elections were called. The rump PAP won the election with a two-thirds majority therefore staving off any attempts by the Barisan Sosialis to move further motions of no confidence. Following merger and separation (1963–1965), and with Barisan's boycott of Parliament, the PAP was the dominant party in Parliament and motions of no confidence became "rare", in fact "non-existent". Further, Lee Kuan Yew's 1961 motion of confidence remains the only time that a Singaporean prime minister has ever tabled a motion of confidence in his own government.

=== Sweden ===
A motion of no confidence may be levelled against either the prime minister on behalf of the entire Swedish government or against an individual lower-level minister. At least 35 members of parliament (MPs) must support a proposal to initiate such a vote. A majority of MPs (175 members) must vote for a motion of no confidence for it to be successful. An individual minister who loses a confidence vote must resign. If a prime minister loses a no-confidence vote, the entire government must resign. The speaker may allow the ousted prime minister to head a transitional or caretaker government until Parliament elects a new prime minister.

Under the principle of negative parliamentarism, a prime ministerial candidate nominated by the Speaker does not need the confidence of a majority of MPs to be elected. However, a majority of MPs must not vote against the candidate, which renders prime ministerial votes similar to no-confidence votes. That means that a prime ministerial candidate, to be successful in the parliamentary vote, must have at least a total of 175 votes in favour or abstention. If a Speaker fails four times to have a nominee elected, an election must be held within three months of the final vote.

=== Turkey ===
Between 1923 and 2017, the Grand National Assembly of Turkey held the right to remove the prime minister and the cabinet through a motion of no confidence. As a result of the 2017 Turkish constitutional referendum, the system of government was changed from parliamentary to presidential, and the articles containing the office of prime ministry and the procedure were removed from the constitution.

=== United Kingdom ===
Traditionally, in the Westminster system, the defeat of a supply bill, which concerns the spending of money, is seen to require automatically for the government to resign or ask for a new election, much like a no-confidence vote. A government in a Westminster system that cannot spend money is hamstrung, which is also called a loss of supply.

One of the most famous motions of no-confidence in British history was against James Callaghan who lost a motion of no-confidence by just one vote (311–310). There are other, failed motions of no confidence such as that of Theresa May which was defeated by a narrow margin of 325–306, and that of Boris Johnson which was defeated by a greater margin (347–238).

In the British Parliament, a no-confidence motion generally first appeared as an early day motion although the vote on the Speech from the Throne was also a confidence motion. However, from 2011 to 2022, under the then-Fixed-term Parliaments Act 2011, only a motion explicitly resolving that "this House has no confidence in His Majesty's Government" was treated as a motion of no confidence. In 2022 the Fixed-term Parliaments Act 2011 was repealed by the Dissolution and Calling of Parliament Act 2022.

== Semi-presidential systems ==
In semi-presidential systems, the legislature may occasionally pass motions of no confidence, which removes only the cabinet and the prime minister. The legislature may also have the power to impeach an executive or judicial officer, with another institution or the legislature removing the officer from their office.

=== France ===
In France, the conditions under which the National Assembly, the lower house of the French Parliament, can bring down the government through a motion of no-confidence are outlined in paragraphs 2 and 3 of article 49 of the Constitution of the Fifth Republic:

- a spontaneous motion of no-confidence (article 49.2)
  - requires the sponsoring of 58 MPs (a tenth of the total number of lawmakers) to be tabled;
  - is debated and voted upon at least 48 hours after it has been tabled;
  - needs the backing of an absolute majority of the National Assembly members (normally 289 out of 577) to be passed;
  - an MP cannot sponsor more than three different spontaneous motions of no-confidence per regular parliamentary session and no more than one per extraordinary parliamentary session.
- a motion of no-confidence in response to the Council of Ministers' decision to push a bill through without a vote (article 49.3)
  - same conditions to be tabled and passed than those outlined in article 49.2;
  - no numerical limits set on the MPs' ability to sponsor such a motion.

In both cases, if the motion succeeds, the prime minister is required to tender their government's resignation to the President, which the President is supposed to accept.

In the particular case of a motion of no-confidence tabled in response to the government's pushing a bill through without a vote under the provisions of article 49 paragraph 3, if the motion succeeds, the government falls and the bill on which it has committed its responsibility is defeated in this stage of procedure. However, it can still be tabled in the Senate and end up becoming law if it passes the remaining stages of procedure.

Three motions of no-confidence have been passed since the start of the Fifth Republic in 1958: one in 1962, a second in 2024, and a third in 2025.

- In 1962, a spontaneous motion of no-confidence under article 49 paragraph 2 was tabled against the Pompidou government over a constitutional reform dispute. The Assembly passed the motion on 5 October 1962, by 280 votes (the absolute majority required was 241 at that time). President de Gaulle refused to accept PM Pompidou's resignation, instead dissolving the National Assembly and calling a snap election that resulted in an increased majority for his government.
- a motion of no-confidence under article 49 paragraph 3 was passed against the Barnier Government on 4 December 2024 by 331 votes (required majority of 288). In accordance with the Constitution, Barnier resigned as Prime Minister on 5 December and the 2025 Social Security budget bill, on which the PM resorted to the special constitutional power, was defeated without a vote.
- a motion of no-confidence under article 49.1 was passed against the Bayrou Government on 8 September 2025 by 364 votes (required majority of 280). Bayrou called the motion on 25 August 2025 in anticipation of his attempt to pass a finance bill, consisting of €44 billion in spending cuts. Bayrou resigned as Prime Minister on 9 September 2025.

During the Third Republic, members of both the Senate and Chamber of Deputies could, with a simple interpellation and a vote, force the government into resigning, creating instability. The Fourth Republic introduced the censure motion with the majority of the membership needed to pass to replace interpellation, and removed the option of initiative by the Senate. Nevertheless, instability continued. According to historian René Rémond, President of the Council Paul Ramadier set up a precedent by submitting the composition of his government to a confidence vote after an interpellation by a deputy, despite the constitution not mentioning this process, thus recreating the problem of the preceding republic. The Fifth Republic restricted again the conditions of the motion by counting only the votes in favor of the deposition of the government, one tenth of the Assembly's membership (58 deputies) being now needed to issue such motion according to Article 49 of the constitution. Article 27 allows lawmakers to delegate their votes for the no-confidence motion if they are not available the day of the open ballot.

=== Russia ===
In Russia, the lower house of the Federal Assembly (the State Duma) may by a simple majority (at least 226 votes out of 450) pass a motion of no confidence against the government of Russia as a whole. In that case, the matter goes for consideration of the Russian president, who may choose to dismiss the cabinet, which he can do anyway anytime at his own discretion, or just ignore the Duma's decision. If the Duma passes a second motion of no confidence against the same composition of the cabinet within three months, the president is forced to make a concrete decision on whether to dismiss the government or to dissolve the Duma itself and call for new general elections. The State Duma may not be dissolved on those grounds if it was elected less than a year earlier, if it has already initiated impeachment proceedings against the president himself by bringing respective accusations, if less than six months remain left until presidential elections, or if there is a state of emergency or martial law throughout the whole territory of Russia. In the above-mentioned cases, the president is then effectively forced to dismiss the government.

=== Sri Lanka ===
In Sri Lanka, the Parliament of Sri Lanka may pass a motion of no confidence against the Sri Lankan government. In that case, the government is removed from power and the president of Sri Lanka has to appoint a new prime minister, who has to form a new government.

== Presidential systems ==
Presidential systems with a robust separation of powers and/or fixed election dates generally do not use motions of no confidence and instead use impeachment or recall as a similar mechanism.

=== Ghana ===
Under Article 82 of the Constitution of Ghana, the Parliament of Ghana has the right to pass votes of censure against individual government ministers. These motions are not true motions of no confidence due to their non-binding nature; the president is allowed, but not required, to remove a censured minister.

=== South Korea ===
Under Article 63 of the Constitution of South Korea, the National Assembly has the right to pass motions which recommend the removal of the prime minister or another government minister. These motions are not true motions of no confidence due to their non-binding nature; the president has no obligation to comply with them.

During the authoritarian Fourth and Fifth Republics, these motions for removal operated as true binding motions of no-confidence; however, this "upgrade" was merely window-dressing meant to hypothetically counterbalance the president's power to dissolve the National Assembly. Since the democratization process which resulted in the current Sixth Republic abolished the presidential power of dissolution, the motions of confidence were reduced to non-binding status.

=== United States ===
A motion to vacate in the United States House of Representatives can be used to remove the speaker of the House. The first successful such motion at the federal level (the ouster of Kevin McCarthy in October 2023) was referred to informally as a "no confidence vote" in media reports covering the event.

The consequences of the Speaker being removed are generally not comparable to the effect of a motion of non-confidence in Westminster parliamentary systems. The President, as the head of government, is not affected; there are no changes to the Cabinet or individual executive positions, which are separated from the legislature; there is no change to the party alignments in the House of Representatives (as the removed Speaker retains the congressional seat); and there are no new elections immediately after a successful motion to vacate, since Congressional elections are set in the Constitution for every two years, regardless of any other circumstances. There is no means to dissolve the House of Representatives as a whole in the way a motion of no confidence often leads to. Thus, the most meaningful consequence of a Speaker's removal that could be compared to a Westminster no confidence vote is the possibility of a change in legislative priorities, these being largely set by the Speaker in the U.S. House, as opposed to by a Prime Minister in the Westminster system.

While the President and Cabinet members can be removed and disqualified from office through impeachment by the House and conviction in the Senate, this is not considered a no confidence vote, since impeachment can only be invoked in the case of a crime.

Section 4 of the Twenty-fifth Amendment to the United States Constitution provides a framework for a motion of no confidence against the President of the United States, intended to be used in the event of the President's incapacitation, but vaguely worded to be applicable in any example of inability to perform the job. The initial motion is issued by the Vice President and a majority of the president's Cabinet, at which point the President is suspended from duty and the Vice President becomes acting President; if the President objects to the motion, a second motion of no confidence must be issued, then approved by two-thirds of both the House and the Senate within three weeks of the second motion, to become permanent. To date, Section 4 of the Twenty-fifth Amendment, which was originally ratified in 1967, has never been invoked.

Some U.S. states permit the recall of their state governors, which are elected by direct popular vote in all 50 states. Unlike impeachment, a recall can be invoked for any reason and is undertaken by the electorate at-large rather than the legislature; this effectively replicates the dynamics behind a motion of no-confidence, with the governor taking the place of the prime minister and the electorate at-large taking the place of parliament.

== History ==
The first motion of no confidence against an entire government occurred in March 1782 when, following news of the British defeat at Yorktown in the American Revolutionary War the previous October, the Parliament of Great Britain voted that it "can no longer repose confidence in the present ministers". British Prime Minister Lord North responded by asking King George III to accept his resignation. That did not immediately create a constitutional convention. Although it is considered the first formal motion of no confidence, Sir Robert Walpole's resignation after a defeat on a vote in the House of Commons in 1742 is considered to be the first de facto motion of no confidence.

During the early 19th century, attempts by prime ministers, such as Robert Peel, to govern in the absence of a parliamentary majority proved unsuccessful, and by the mid-19th century, the power of a motion of no confidence to break a government was firmly established in the UK.

In the United Kingdom, 11 prime ministers have been defeated through a no-confidence motion, but there has been only one such defeat since 1925, in the 1979 vote of no confidence in the Callaghan ministry against James Callaghan.

In modern times, the passage of a motion of no confidence is a relatively rare event in two-party democracies. In almost all cases, party discipline is sufficient to allow a majority party to defeat a motion of no confidence, and if faced with possible defections in the government party, the government is likely to change its policies, rather than lose a vote of no confidence. The cases in which a motion of no confidence has passed are generally those in which the government party's slim majority has been eliminated by either by-elections or defections, such as the 1979 vote of no confidence in the Callaghan ministry in the UK which was carried by one vote and forced a general election, which was won by Margaret Thatcher's Conservative Party.

Motions of no confidence are far more common in multi-party systems in which a minority party must form a coalition government. That can mean that there have been many short-lived governments because the party structure allows small parties to defeat a government which does not have the majority needed to create a government. This has widely been regarded as the cause of instability for the French Fourth Republic and the German Weimar Republic. More recent examples have been in Italy between the 1950s and 1990s, Israel, and Japan.

To deal with that situation, the French placed a greater degree of executive power in the office of the French president, along with a two-round plurality voting system, which makes it easier to form a stable majority government. Furthermore, since 2014, the French president can be impeached only if three conditions are fulfilled: one of the Houses of the French parliament must adopt a sitting in High Court proposal with a two-third majority, then the other house has to follow suit in a 15-day period, then two third of the members of the High Court have to vote in favor of the president's impeachment during a one-month period where the Court must decide. The president can still pursue the exercise of his functions during the process.

In 2008, Canadian Prime Minister Stephen Harper, leading a minority government, requested Governor General Michaëlle Jean to prorogue Parliament. The prorogation delayed a potential no-confidence motion presented by the opposition. (See 2008–2009 Canadian parliamentary dispute.) Three years later, in 2011, Harper's minority government was defeated by a motion of no confidence, which declared the government to be in contempt of Parliament and led to an election that year.

In 2013, during the Euromaidan pro-European riots, the opposition in Ukraine called for a motion of no confidence against the Cabinet of Ministers, led by the pro-Russian and eurosceptic Prime Minister Mykola Azarov. At least 226 votes were needed to gain a majority in Ukraine's Verkhovna Rada. However, it fell 40 votes short, and Azarov's government prevailed.

On 1 June 2018, in Spain, the government of Mariano Rajoy was ousted after a motion of no confidence passed 180–169 after the sentence of the Gürtel corruption scandal, which involved the ruling party. Pedro Sánchez was sworn in as the new Spanish prime minister. That was the first time in the history of Spain that a vote of no confidence resulted in a change of government.

On 25 September 2018, Swedish Prime Minister Stefan Löfven was ousted after he lost a vote of no confidence in the Riksdag after an election was held on 9 September. The center-left bloc led by Löfven's Social Democratic Party won only 144 seats in parliament, 31 seats short of an absolute majority, and just one seat more than the opposition Alliance for Sweden bloc. The Sweden Democrats, having just won 62 seats, also voted with the main opposition bloc's motion of no confidence.

On 8 March 2022, opposition parties filed the motion against then prime minister of Pakistan Imran Khan. Out of 346, 172 votes have required to gain the majority in national assembly of Pakistan. On 10 April 2022, motion of no confidence was passed by 174 votes out of 346. This was the first time in the history of Pakistan that vote of no confidence resulted in a change of government.

== See also ==
- Impeachment
- Constructive vote of no confidence
- Interpellation
- Confidence motions in the United Kingdom
- List of motions of no confidence in the Netherlands
