= Büyükkışla, Şereflikoçhisar =

Büyükkışla
- Neighbourhood
- Location within Turkey Location within Turkey Central Anatolia
- Coordinates: 39.1992°N 33.2606°E
- Country: Turkey
- Province: Ankara
- District: Şereflikoçhisar
- Population (2022): 322
- Time zone: UTC+3 (TRT)

Büyükkışla is a neighbourhood in the municipality and district of Şereflikoçhisar, Ankara Province, Turkey. Its population is 322 (2022). The village is populated by Kurds.

== Notable people ==
- Selçuk Öztürk (born 1972), Dutch politician of Turkish descent
