= Stephan van Baarle =

Dutch politician (born 1991)

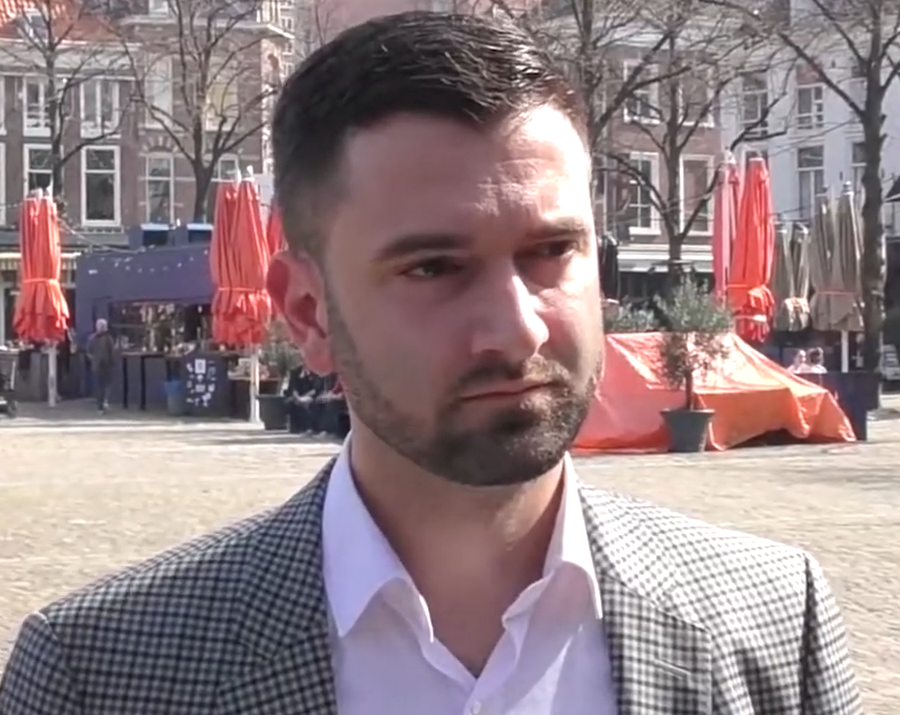
- Van Baarle in 2021

Leader of Denk
- Incumbent
- Assumed office 3 August 2023
- Preceded by: Farid Azarkan

Member of the House of Representatives
- Incumbent
- Assumed office 31 March 2021

Member of the Rotterdam Municipal Council
- In office 29 March 2018 – 29 March 2022

Personal details
- Born: Stephan Ruben Tobias van Baarle; 25 August 1991 (age 35) Rotterdam, Netherlands
- Party: Denk (since 2015)
- Other political affiliations: Labour Party (until 2015)
- Education: Erasmus University Rotterdam (MA)

Stephan Ruben Tobias van Baarle (born 25 August 1991) is a Dutch politician. A member of the minority interest party Denk, he served on the Rotterdam municipal council from 2018 to 2022. He was elected to the House of Representatives in 2021 and succeeded Farid Azarkan as Denk's parliamentary leader two years later.

== Early life and education ==
He was born in 1991 in Rotterdam to a Dutch mother and a Turkish father. Van Baarle was raised by his mother as an only child in the Rotterdam neighborhood Vreewijk, and he attended the high school Vreewijk Lyceum. He studied sociology at Erasmus University Rotterdam, graduating cum laude, and became a junior lecturer at his university. He was also active for the Labour Party in 2014.

== Politics ==
In 2015, when Denk was established, Van Baarle started working as a policy officer for the party's House caucus and as director of its think tank Statera. He was one of the first members of Denk, which was founded by two MPs who had left the Labour Party the year before. Van Baarle ran for member of parliament in the 2017 general election, being placed fifth on Denk's party list. He also chaired the election program committee. He was not elected, as his party received three seats and his 408 preference votes were not enough to meet the threshold. Van Baarle was Denk's lead candidate in Rotterdam in the 2018 municipal elections. His party won four seats in the municipal council, while lijstduwer Tunahan Kuzu received almost twice as many votes as Van Baarle. He also remained on as a policy officer. In the council, where he served as caucus leader, Van Baarle successfully proposed a ban on disturbances by the street use of laughing gas together with Livable Rotterdam. He was nominated for Best Politician of Rotterdam by a cooperation of a number of Rotterdam press organizations in both 2018 and 2019. Van Baarle supported Denk's parliamentary leader Farid Azarkan when he was being expelled from the party by its board in May 2020, and he called on the board to resign.

He was DENK's third candidate in the 2021 general election and also served as the party's campaign manager. He was installed as member of the House of Representatives on 31 March after he was elected with 2,449 preference votes. Van Baarle did not leave the municipal council, but he did step down as caucus leader the following month. He was one of the party's lijstduwers in Rotterdam in the March 2022 municipal elections, leading to the end of this council membership after 29 March. In the House, Van Baarle worked on combatting discrimination in the selection of interns. A motion of his was passed to utilize mystery inspectors to test companies' adherence to the law. Van Baarle was opposed to a new sex education curriculum for primary schools, saying that children are too young to be exposed to the curriculum. He has also complained that, in his view, expressions of sex and sexual diversity are imposed too much on others including children.

=== Party leader ===
In July 2023 – shortly after the collapse of the fourth Rutte cabinet had triggered a November 2023 general election – Farid Azarkan announced that he would leave politics. Van Baarle succeeded him as parliamentary leader on 3 August, and he announced his intention to become Denk's lead candidate in a video featuring Azarkan. Van Baarle said that it was important for a new generation to take responsibility and that he would double down on the party's commitment to fight racism, exclusion, and xenophobia. Denk's board announced it had officially chosen Van Baarle as its lead candidate on 10 September.

Following the 7 October 2023 Hamas attack on Israel, Van Baarle denounced shows of support to Israel from the Netherlands, referring to the country as an apartheid state. His party did not attend a commemoration for the attack's victims organized in the House of Representatives. Van Baarle also said the Dutch cabinet should highlight that cutting off the supply of water, electricity, and food to the Gaza Strip constituted a war crime. Online, his party spread maps of Israel including the occupied Palestinian territory fully covered by the flag of Palestine. Van Baarle clarified that he supported a one-state solution with Palestinian rule and equality between Muslims and Jews.

During a 24 October debate in the House, Van Baarle used the Palestinian liberation slogan "From the river to the sea, Palestine will be free". Other members of parliament condemned his usage of the slogan, which they called antisemitic as it leaves no room for the State of Israel. When Bij1 MP Sylvana Simons repeated the slogan, Speaker Vera Bergkamp deprived her of the floor. A slim House majority supported a motion calling the slogan incitement to violence despite an earlier legal ruling deeming it not illegal.

In March 2024, Van Baarle and leader of the far-right Forum for Democracy party Thierry Baudet were the only two parliamentary party leaders in the House of Representatives to abstain on supporting a statement against antisemitism.

=== House committee memberships ===
==== 2021–2023 term ====
- Committee for Agriculture, Nature and Food Quality
- Committee for Education, Culture and Science
- Committee for Infrastructure and Water Management
- Committee for the Interior
- Committee for Social Affairs and Employment
- Procedure Committee

==== 2023–present term ====
- Committee for the Interior
- Committee for Kingdom Relations
- Public Expenditure committee
- Committee for European Affairs
- Committee for Foreign Trade and Development
- Committee for Foreign Affairs
- Committee for Defence
- Committee for Asylum and Migration

== Personal life ==
Van Baarle is a resident of Rotterdam and is an agnostic. He is a supporter of football club Feyenoord and a fan of the German band Rammstein, and he plays the guitar.

== Electoral history ==
Electoral history of Stephan van Baarle
Year	Body	Party	Pos.	Votes	Result		Ref.
Year	Body	Party	Pos.	Votes	Party seats	Individual	Ref.
2017	House of Representatives	DENK	5	408	3 / 150	Lost	
2021	House of Representatives	DENK	3	2,449	3 / 150	Won	
2023	House of Representatives	DENK	1	161,730	3 / 150	Won	
2025	House of Representatives	DENK	1	156,427	3 / 150	Won	
2026	The Hague Municipal Council	DENK	38 (Note: Van Baarle participated as lijstduwer.)	1,026	3 / 45	Lost	
