= Paulus Jansen =

Dutch politician and civil engineer

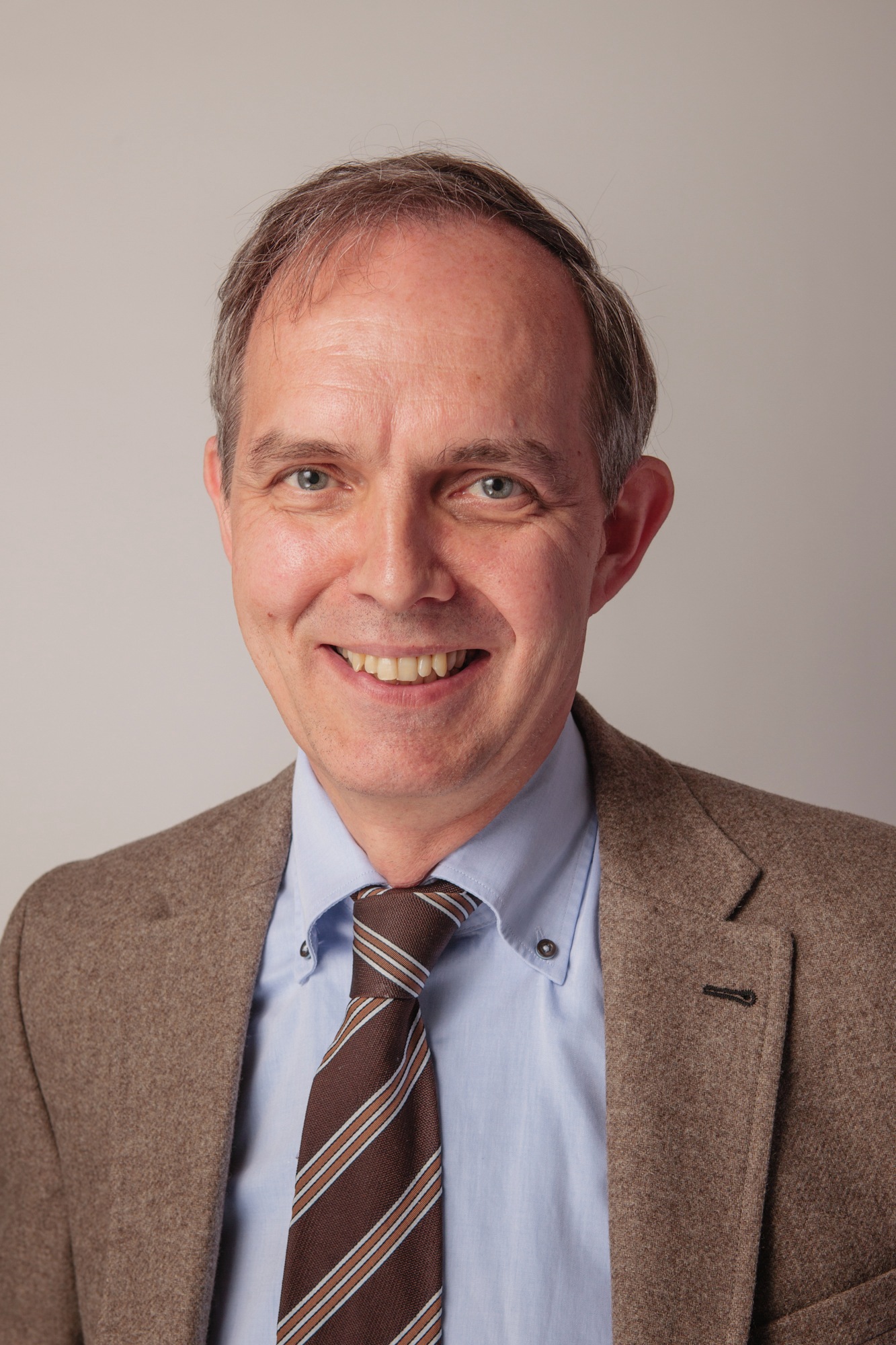
Paulus Jansen

Paulus Fredericus Cornelius Jansen (born 2 March 1954) is a Dutch civil engineer and Socialist Party politician who served as a member of the House of Representatives from 30 November 2006 until 14 May 2014.

Jansen was born in Roermond and studied architectural engineering at Eindhoven University of Technology. From 1995 to 2003 he was a member as well as SP group leader in the provincial council of the province of Utrecht. From 2001 to 2006 he was a member as well as SP group leader of the municipal council of the city of Utrecht. He became a member of the House of Representatives on 30 November 2006. In the House, he focused on matters of natural environment, climate change, spatial planning, water management, housing, energy and environmental noise. He officially left the House of Representatives on 13 May 2014 and was permanently replaced by Tjitske Siderius, who until then had temporary replaced Renske Leijten. He served as alderman for housing, animal welfare and sport in the city of Utrecht between 8 May 2014 and 7 June 2018.

== Electoral history ==
An (incomplete) overview of Dutch elections Jansen participated in
Election	Party	Candidate number	Votes
1998 Dutch general election	Socialist Party		
1999 European Parliament election in the Netherlands	Socialist Party	5	
2002 Dutch general election	Socialist Party		
2006 Dutch general election	Socialist Party	18	716
2010 Dutch municipal elections in Utrecht	Socialist Party	11	82
2010 Dutch general election	Socialist Party	13	966
2012 Dutch general election	Socialist Party	12	994
2014 Dutch municipal elections in Utrecht	Socialist Party	29	78
2018 Dutch municipal elections in Utrecht	Socialist Party	30	
2021 Dutch general election	Socialist Party	48	50
2022 Dutch municipal elections in Utrecht	Socialist Party	24	35
