= Ismail el Abassi =

Dutch politician (born 1983)

Member of the House of Representatives
- Incumbent
- Assumed office 6 December 2023

Personal details
- Born: 27 February 1983 (age 43)
- Party: DENK party

Ismail El Abassi (born 27 February 1983) is a Dutch politician from the DENK party. He is a member of the House of Representatives.

== Political career ==
In the 2023 Dutch general election he was elected to the Dutch House of Representatives. In a debate, El Abassi called for a ban on the burning of religious books, stressing a rise in antisemitic and Islamophobic incidents and the importance for individuals to practice their religion safely. Minister of Justice and Security Dilan Yeşilgöz responded that such expressions should remain legal in a liberal democracy.

=== House committees ===
- Committee for Justice and Security
- Committee for Economic Affairs
- Committee for Health, Welfare and Sport
- Committee for Infrastructure and Water Management
- Committee for Housing and Spatial Planning
- Committee for Climate Policy and Green Growth

== Personal life ==
El Abassi played football for the youth team of FC Utrecht.

== Electoral history ==
Electoral history of Ismail el Abassi
Year	Body	Party	Pos.	Votes	Result		Ref.
Year	Body	Party	Pos.	Votes	Party seats	Individual	Ref.
2023	House of Representatives	DENK	3	20,372	3	Won	
2025	House of Representatives	DENK	3	23,236	3	Won	

== See also ==
- List of members of the House of Representatives of the Netherlands, 2023–present
