= Denk (political party) =

Dutch political party

- Leader: Stephan van Baarle
- Chairman: Tunahan Kuzu
- Leader in the House of Representatives: Stephan van Baarle
- Founders: Tunahan Kuzu; Selçuk Öztürk
- Founded: 9 February 2015
- Split from: Labour Party
- Headquarters: Lodewijk Pincoffsweg 503, Rotterdam
- Youth wing: Jongerenbeweging Oppositie
- Think tank: Wetenschappelijk Instituut Statera
- Membership (2026): ▲5,305
- Ideology: Social democracy; Social conservatism; Minority interests
- Political position: Centre-left
- Colours: Turquoise; Orange
- Senate: 0 / 75
- House of Representatives: 3 / 150
- European Parliament: 0 / 31
- Provincial councils: 0 / 570

Website
- bewegingdenk.nl

Denk (Dutch: [dɛŋk], Turkish: [dæɲc]; Dutch for 'think' and Turkish for 'equal' / 'balanced'), legally registered as Politieke Beweging Denk ("Political Movement Denk"), is a political party in the Netherlands, founded on a platform catering to those from an immigrant and Muslim background. It is generally positioned towards the centre-left of the political spectrum and advocates for a tolerant, multicultural society although it also contains socially conservative attitudes among its members.

The party was founded by Tunahan Kuzu and Selçuk Öztürk, two Turkish Dutch members of the House of Representatives, after leaving the Labour Party on 13 November 2014. Upon winning three seats at the 2017 election, Denk became the first migrant-founded party to gain seats in the Dutch national parliament.

Although the party has been colloquially described as a "Muslim political party", Denk "does not promote Muslim candidates as do most similar political parties in Europe". Denk's current party leader and lijsttrekker in the House of Representatives, Stephan van Baarle, is an agnostic. Under his leadership, however, Denk took more conservative positions on LGBT rights and medico-ethical issues. The party has also courted some controversy for links between its members and Turkish nationalist circles.

== History ==
=== Origins ===
Denk was founded by Tunahan Kuzu and Selçuk Öztürk after leaving the Labour Party on 13 November 2014. Their resignations were prompted by proposals by Deputy Prime Minister and party leader Lodewijk Asscher that a number of Turkish Islamist organisations be monitored for interfering with the integration of Dutch citizens of Muslim origin. This came after an internal party debate sparked by a report incorrectly stating that 90% of young Turkish Dutch supported ISIS.

On 9 February 2015, they named their parliamentary group "Denk", and they published a political manifesto for the establishment of a movement focused on a tolerant society through measures such as the introduction of a registry of racists who could not be hired by the government. In January 2016 Denk became eligible under Dutch party registration law for a subsidy after reaching the required minimum membership of 1,000. However, the basic amount of €250,000 had to be shared with the party from which it split (the Labour Party).

=== Expansion ===
Over the course of 2015 and 2016, Denk saw its membership grow with notable public figures joining Denk including former professional model and Miss Netherlands Tatjana Maul, chairman of the Moroccan Dutch Association Farid Azarkan, and actress and television presenter Sylvana Simons who joined the party as a communications advisor at the invitation of Kuzu. Simons announced her intention to stand on Denk's list for the next general election and stated that her aim in running for parliament was to tackle institutional racism and to help "decolonize" Dutch politics. Denk also gained municipal representation for the first time when council members from Alkmaar and Veenendaal switched from the PvdA and D66.

In December 2016, Denk's growth also saw an ideological schism between the socially conservative and the liberal and progressive orientated factions, which culminated in Simons and Denk's former campaign manager Ian van der Kooye resigning to form their own political party BIJ1. According to Simons, she supported Denk's ideals but argued the party was more focused on media attention and accused its leaders of insufficiently supporting LGBT rights and feminism. Simons furthermore claimed that Denk's leadership had not supported her when she received death threats. In January 2017, Denk demanded legal damages from Simons and Kooye for making negative comments about the party to the press. The court later rejected Denk's claims and awarded Simons damages.

=== Breakthrough and internal struggles ===
Denk saw a breakthrough in the results from the 2017 Dutch general election which ensured that Kuzu and Öztürk retained their seats in parliament together with new arrival Farid Azarkan.

In March 2020, Kuzu announced he was stepping down as party leader and was replaced by Azarkan. According to the party's board Kuzu allegedly had an extramarital affair in 2018 while magazine HP/De Tijd reported that Kuzu had displayed inappropriate behavior towards a female party employee. Kuzu denied the allegations and said Öztürk had carried out a "political fratricide attempt" on him. Media speculation for Kuzu's departure was likely a power struggle between him and party chairman Öztürk. Shortly afterwards it was announced that Azarkan called on the DENK party board, including Öztürk, to resign. The call was rejected by the board who said it was up to the party's members to determine its future.

On the 6th of May 2020, Denk's board which effectively consisted only of Öztürk and Zahir Rana announced in a press statement that they had dismissed Azarkan as party leader. In response to the decision, Kuzu and all local faction leaders said that they fully supported Azarkan while Azarkan released a video on YouTube addressed to Öztürk in which he stated he would not consider resigning and called on him to step down. By 9 May, Kuzu, Azarkan, and Öztürk had reportedly resolved their differences and continued their positions in the party. However, a month later Öztürk resigned as chairman with immediate effect. Member of Parliament Metin Çelik and Denk municipal councilor Gürcü Polat were nominated and elected to form the interim board until the next party elections while lawyer Ejder Köse was appointed as the new party chairman.

In 2021, the Islam Democrats party which had been active on the Hague Municipal Council merged into Denk. The Islam Democrats leadership also called on members of NIDA to join Denk.

=== 2022-present ===
During the 2022 Dutch municipal elections Denk won representation in Rotterdam and Schiedam. In September 2023, Stephan van Baarle took over as party leader. Under Van Baarle, Denk put forward a new list of candidates which included Schiedam faction leader Doğukan Ergin and footballer Ismail el Abassi. The party retained the three seats during the 2023 and 2025 general elections.

== Ideology and advocacy ==
The party advocates for the interests of various minorities within the Netherlands, including those of Turkish Dutch, Moroccan Dutch, Afro Dutch, and Dutch Muslim backgrounds. On its policy manifesto, Denk describes itself as a social democratic party and calls for a return to the Polder model of Dutch politics. It aims to combat social exclusion and economic inequality among minority groups and says that it supports a tolerant, multicultural and pro-immigration society in which minorities have equal rights, describing diversity as a "driving force" of Dutch society. Denk has also highlighted first generation gastarbeider migrants who have not yet reached retirement as a core concern. Sources have labelled Denk variously as a pro-Islam party, a Muslim political party or at times an Islamist and Islamic party due to some of its statements and positions, although Denk does not identify itself with these labels during elections and its current leader van Baarle has called himself agnostic. Despite this, Denk has maintained contact and collaboration with both Islamic political parties in the Netherlands such as the Islam Democrats and Turkish nationalist organizations. Political scientist Sofie Blombäck has compared Denk to the Swedish Nuance Party as minority interest parties that target immigrant voters particularly of Muslim backgrounds while others have compared Denk and Dutch party NIDA as part of a recent trend of "Muslim political parties" that have formed in Europe.

=== Manifesto ===
The key goals of DENK are "fighting discrimination and creating an inclusive, pluralistic society". It takes stances supportive of multiculturalism, but combines this with socially conservative positions on certain moral and legal issues. It is also economically left-wing. According to political scholars at Leiden University, Denk combines progressive pro-multicultural and immigration positions and holds a centre-left economic orientation but uses more socially conservative rhetoric on areas such as euthanasia, homosexuality, matters of religious conscience and certain positions on law and order, where it favours stronger punishments for murder and child molestation. Political scientist Thomas Buser classified Denk to be economically to the left of PvdA while being almost as socially conservative as the Christian Union.

The movement drew up a political manifesto in February 2015, from which the political party Denk emerged in November 2016.

The Denk programme argues for the following five points:

- a tolerant society in which we accept each other.
- a caring society in which we look out for each other.
- a learning society in which we utilize everyone's talents.
- a sustainable society where we have to think about our environment.
- a just society, promoting international justice.

Denk wants to establish a monument in memory of labor and they want knowledge of migration history as a school subject in education. They propose that the term "integration" should be replaced by the word "acceptance". The movement suggests abolishing the word "immigrant" within government policy while party leader Stephan van Baarle has described the concept of cultural integration as an "artificial term." In its 2017-2021 manifesto platform, Denk said that people with a non-Western background are less likely to find a job or internship and often have negative experiences with law enforcement. The manifesto states that racism in the Netherlands is structural and institutional in nature and supports a so-called "racism registry" to be set up, in which manifestations of racism are registered by the government and registered individuals should be banned from certain jobs.

Denk proposes that in education, diversity in the classroom is commensurate with the diversity of the class (including the teacher). The movement has a policy that in every school in the Netherlands, both in primary and secondary education, study of Chinese, Arabic, and Turkish must be introduced as optional subjects. According to the movement, education in these languages will be useful for the country's economy and international relations. According to the 2015 manifesto, imams should not only be appointed to mosques, but also in health care, prisons and the armed forces.

Denk's view is that the United Nations and its Security Council need fundamental reform and that the European Union should pursue an independent foreign policy. The movement wants to tackle Islamic extremism by tackling its root causes, which, according to the party, consist of hopelessness, social exclusion, and injustice. On the Israeli–Palestinian conflict, the party advocates that Europe strengthen the international position of Palestine. It opposes dialogue between Israel and Palestinians and instead argues that the Netherlands should unilaterally recognize the State of Palestine.

The party carries the program advanced by the International Institute for Scientific Research, based in The Hague, with the purpose of decolonization. Among its policies, Denk seeks to: establish a "racism register" to track and condemn the use of hate speech against religion; build a Dutch slavery museum; abolish the black character Zwarte Piet ("Black Pete"); and ban the use of the Dutch word "Allochtoon" which it considers as derogatory and offensive towards ethnic minorities in the Netherlands.

Although Denk's some of social and economic policies overlap with parties on the left such as GroenLinks, PvdA, D66 and the SP it also takes a more conservative stance on certain law & order issues that are aligned to policies on the Dutch right; for example Denk's Rotterdam chapter tabled a motion with Livable Rotterdam and VVD to ban the use of laughing gas in public. On its platform, Denk argues that crime should be tackled through investigating its root causes, which the party claims to be poverty, lack of opportunity and racial discrimination.

The party has been described as pro-immigration and supporting multiculturalism, as well as being identified with identity politics. It has described tackling "right-wing xenophobia" against immigrants which it claims to be present within the VVD and PVV as a core priority.

While Denk claims a minority rights position, it has moved in a socially conservative direction on LGBT rights since its founding which was a factor in prompting an early split in 2016 with the party's progressive faction departing to found Artikel 1 (later renamed BIJ1). It has been described as part of the anti-gender movement and leader Van Baarle has voiced opposition to expanding sex education in Dutch schools, although Van Baarle has claimed this to be a "common sense" rather than a conservative or purely religious standpoint. Although Denk overlaps on social equality, identity politics and pro-immigration stances with BIJ1, scholars have noted that it also takes a culturally divergent view from other parties on the Dutch left with a 2024 study noting that Denk takes a less socially liberal and more morally authoritarian tone on gay rights and freedom of expression, with the party tailoring its messages and candidate lists to appeal to conservative Muslim voting blocks.

== Electorate ==
The party mainly attracts support from ethnic minorities in the Netherlands, especially from the Turkish and Moroccan population. Correspondingly the support for Denk is the strongest in cities and towns with a significant migrant population, especially in larger cities such as Amsterdam and Rotterdam. In these cities the support for the party is concentrated in majority-minority districts, such as Nieuw-West in Amsterdam or Kanaleneiland in Utrecht, gaining between 30 and 40% of the votes in those districts. The majority of voters with a foreign migration background voted for Denk or BIJ1 in 2023. A study by the University of Amsterdam noted that in 2019, Dutch voters of Turkish origin were more inclined to vote for Denk but in the 2021 election this was replaced by support from those with a Moroccan background, with some commentators attributing the shift with internal problems within the party following a scandal involving former Turkish-Dutch leader Kuzu and his replacement by the Dutch-Moroccan politician Azarkan in 2020.

== Controversies ==
=== Support for the AK Party ===
The two leaders and founders of the party have been criticized for being "closely linked to the AK Party" of Turkish leader Recep Tayyip Erdoğan, and "do not criticize Erdogan and Turkish government policies". Some critics in the Dutch media have called the party the "long arm of Erdoğan" for its perceived support of the party line of the Turkish government and the ruling AK Party. The party was the sole party in the Netherlands that did not call for the release of a Turkish-Dutch blogger who was arrested for a tweet about Erdoğan. The party has also been heavily criticized for refusing to distance itself from the purges in Turkey since 2016. However, as Denk's leader, Kuzu distanced himself from comments of Erdoğan in which the Turkish president called Dutch authorities "Nazi remnants and fascists", labelling those comments "incorrect" and "very troublesome".

The Diyanet, a Turkish governmental unit, has allowed Denk to promote itself in Diyanet-controlled Dutch mosques. There are 146 such mosques as of 2018.

The party's program for the 2017 general election, in the context of the Armenian genocide, mourns both the Turkish and the Armenian sides, while calling for an "independent international investigation". Denk claims that there is no consensus regarding the scale and cause of the tragedy, and calls for "reason and unification". Within that framework, the party does not use the term genocide. In February 2018, Denk was the sole party which voted against a bill recognizing the Armenian Genocide in the House of Representatives.

In March 2018, Özturk drew media attention for speaking at an election rally of the Turkish Federation of the Netherlands which is often described as a neo-fascist and far-right movement with links to the Nationalist Movement Party.

Political journalists in the Netherlands have documented that Denk's parliamentary faction has a record of abstaining or voting against motions which are perceived to hold negative sentiments about Turkey.

=== Targeting Turkish Dutch politicians ===
In March 2020, Denk was condemned by fellow members of the House of Representatives for releasing videos of MPs of Turkish descent from other parties, in which they are portrayed, for example, as "traitors" to the Turkish-Dutch community causing mass harassment of those MPs.

=== Antisemitism ===
Although the party has stated that it opposes antisemitism and all forms of racism and religious discrimination, party members have been accused of making antisemitic comments and tropes or voting against initiatives to combat antisemitism. In 2018, Denk party employee and former staffer Hussein Jamakovic sent threatening and antisemitic emails to various newspapers including De Telegraaf and GeenStijl after the former newspaper had uncovered comments in which Jamakovic had declared support for ISIS.

In March 2018, Denk along with BIJ1 were the only two parties represented on Amsterdam City Council to vote against a motion condemning antisemitism and calling for more security for Jewish Amsterdam residents.

In 2024, Denk leader Stephan van Baarle and chairman of the far-right FvD Thierry Baudet were the only two party leaders in the House of Representatives to abstain on a motion against antisemitism. Denk responded by saying that while it supports measures against antisemitism, it claimed to have abstained due to disagreeing with the wording of the motion.

=== Alleged links to extremist groups ===
In September 2016, Kuzu provoked controversy after speaking at a demonstration in Rotterdam in which he shared the stage with Hamas activist Huseyin Sayilgan and supporters of the far-right Grey Wolves organization were in attendance. Afterwards, Kuzu was asked by VVD politician Halbe Zijlstra to distance himself from Hamas and the Grey Wolves but declined to do so.

=== Fake social media profiles ===
In 2017, NRC Handelsblad reported that Denk was setting up fake social media profiles to influence public opinion. After initially denying the accusations, then party leader Kuzu admitted that members of the party's youth wing had set up troll accounts and had since been confronted about their behaviour by the party's board.

== Elected representatives ==
In the 2025 Dutch general election, three MPs from Denk were elected:

- Ismail el Abassi
- Stephan van Baarle
- Doğukan Ergin

== Electoral results ==
=== House of Representatives ===
Election	Lead candidate	List	Votes	%	Seats	+/–	Government
2017	Tunahan Kuzu	List	216,147	2.1	3 / 150	New	Opposition
2021	Farid Azarkan	List	211,053	2.0	3 / 150	0	Opposition
2023	Stephan van Baarle	List	246,765	2.4	3 / 150	0	Opposition
2025	Stephan van Baarle	List	250,368	2.4	3 / 150	0	Opposition

=== European Parliament ===
Election	Lead candidate	List	Votes	%	Seats	+/–
2019	Ayhan Tonça	List	60,669	1.1	0 / 26	New
2019	Ayhan Tonça	List	60,669	1.1	0 / 29	Steady

== See also ==
- List of political parties in the Netherlands
- Nuance Party
- Democratic Alliance for Diversity and Awakening
