= Farid Azarkan =

Dutch politician (born 1971)

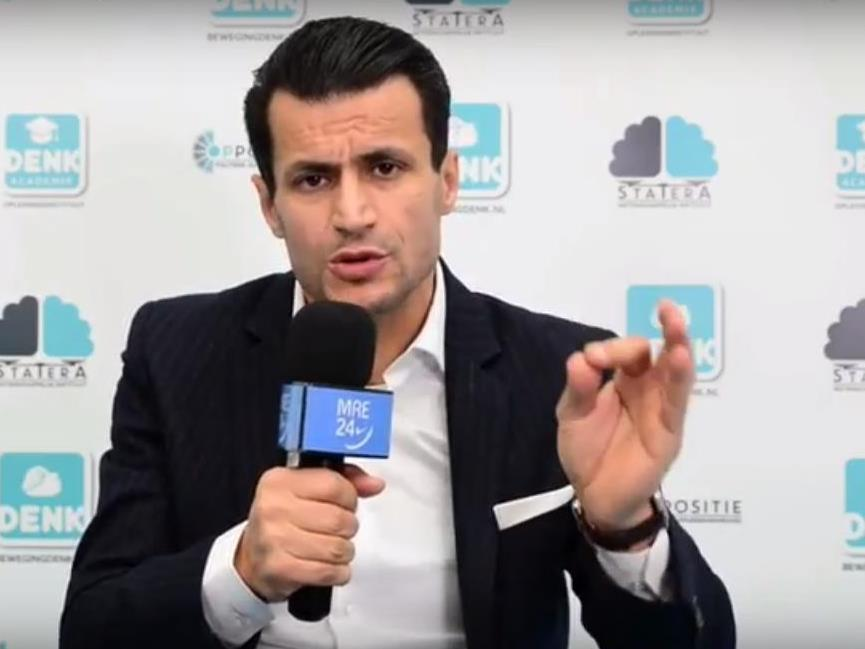
- Azarkan in 2017

Leader of Denk
- In office 26 September 2020 – 3 August 2023
- Preceded by: Tunahan Kuzu
- Succeeded by: Stephan van Baarle

Leader of Denk in the House of Representatives
- In office 21 March 2020 – 3 August 2023
- Preceded by: Tunahan Kuzu
- Succeeded by: Stephan van Baarle

Member of the House of Representatives
- In office 23 March 2017 – 5 December 2023

Personal details
- Born: 16 October 1971 (age 54) Tafersit, Morocco
- Party: Denk
- Education: Christelijke Hogeschool Nederland (BBA); Vrije Universiteit Amsterdam (Drs.); University of Greenwich / Saxion (MSc)

Farid Azarkan (born 16 October 1971) is a Dutch former politician of Moroccan descent who led the political party Denk between 2020 and 2023. Additionally, he has been a member of the House of Representatives since 23 March 2017. Azarkan previously held the position of parliamentary leader between 21 March 2020 and 3 August 2023. Azarkan was the lijsttrekker for Denk in the 2021 general election. For eight years, he chaired the Moroccan Dutch Cooperation Association (SMN)

== Biography ==
Azarkan was born in Morocco and came to the Netherlands at the age of eight as part of family reunification. After leaving secondary school, he attended the Hotelschool The Hague before taking night classes in politics and communication studies at the Vrije Universiteit Amsterdam and later finishing a master's degree in real estate and a doctorate in strategy development from Greenwich University in the United Kingdom. He briefly worked as a civil servant before founding a property consultation business.

In 2016, Azarkan joined DENK which had been founded by former Dutch Labour Party MPs Tunahan Kuzu and Selçuk Öztürk. He stood on the party's list for the 2017 Dutch general election and was elected to parliament. He sat on the committees for housing and the civil service, security and justice, infrastructure and the environment, and finance. Azarkan replaced Kuzu as leader of Denk's parliamentary group from 24 April 2018 to 2 September 2018. In March 2020, he succeeded him as chair of Denk's parliamentary group in the House of Representatives. In May 2020, Denk said in a press release that Azarkan had been expelled from the party. In response to the decision, Kuzu and all local parliamentary group leaders indicated that they fully supported Azarkan. In a YouTube message to chairman Öztürk, Azarkan said he would not step down and called on Öztürk to resign instead.

In September 2020, he was appointed party leader and was re-elected during the 2021 Dutch general election. On 24 July 2023, Azarkan announced that he would leave national politics after the 2023 House of Representatives elections and that he would not run for party leadership again.

== Controversies ==
=== Social media ===
In February 2017, reports surfaced indicating that certain members of the youth department of Denk had created fake social media profiles with the intent of influencing public opinion. Tunahan Kuzu acknowledged the existence of these internet trolls and stated that they would be held accountable for their actions. Furthermore, Kuzu said that "Farid Azarkan may have given some sort of permission, but that is not entirely clear."

Azarkan has been criticised for designing a banner in the style of the PVV with the image of the populist politician Geert Wilders and the logo of the PVV with the slogan "After March 15, we will purify the Netherlands". According to Denk, the idea behind the campaign would have been to "show how far the PVV can go." Nonetheless, the party management, Selçuk Öztürk and Tunahan Kuzu, decided not to place the advertisement.

=== COVID-19 ===
In December 2021, Azarkan came under fire after attending the post-election inauguration of the new House of Representatives and a debate on cabinet formation after testing positive for COVID-19. This came after Azarkan had previously accused the cabinet of irresponsibly handling pandemic measures in a WhatsApp conversation with fellow party member Stephan van Baarle.
