= Doğukan Ergin =

Dutch politician (born 1992)

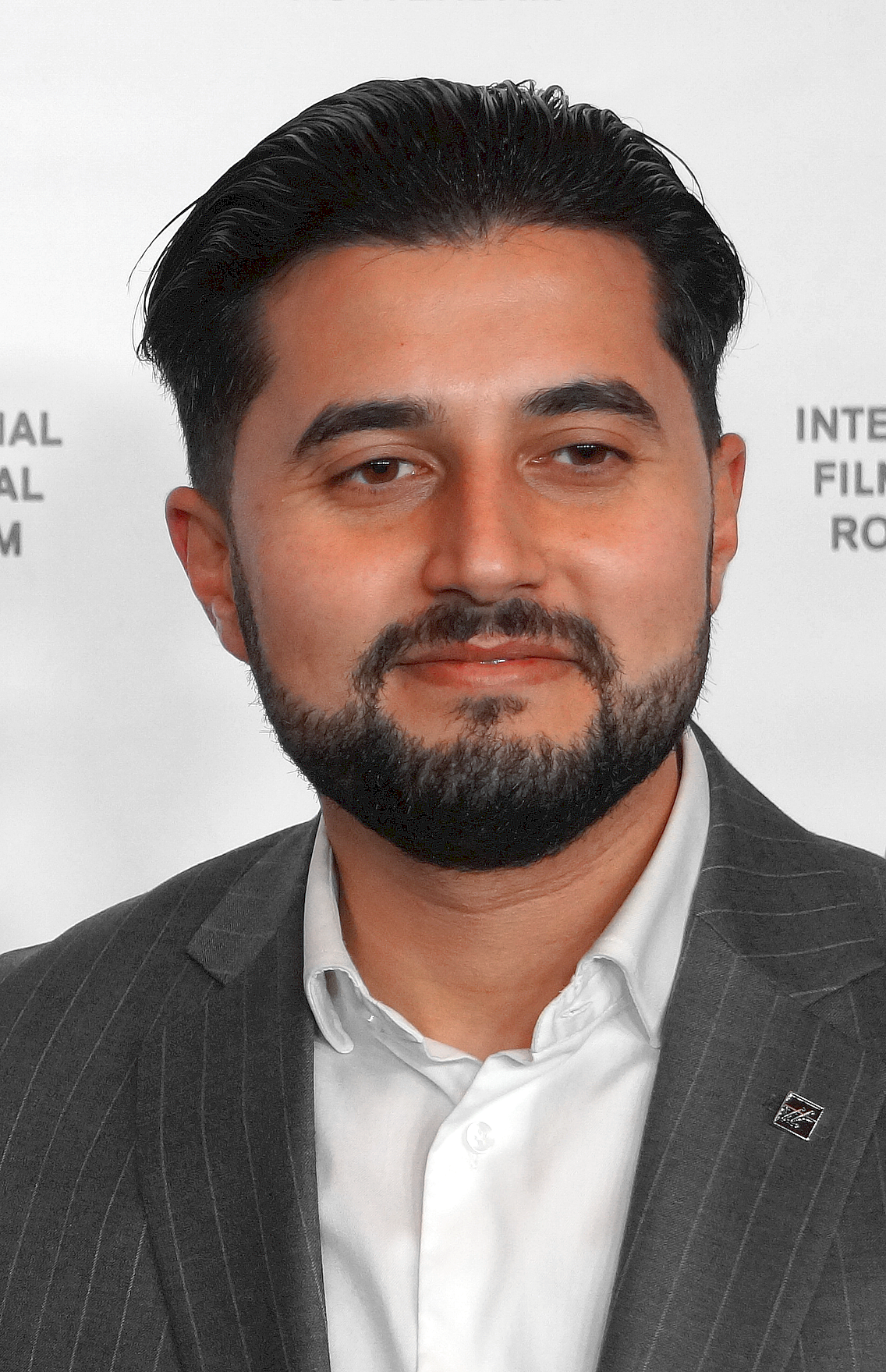

Member of the Dutch House of Representatives
- Incumbent
- Assumed office 2023

Personal details
- Born: 27 March 1992 (age 33) Schiedam, Netherlands
- Party: DENK

Doğukan Ergin (born 27 March 1992) is a Dutch politician from the DENK party. In the 2023 Dutch general election he was elected to the Dutch House of Representatives.

Ergin was a municipal councillor in Schiedam.

== Electoral history ==
Electoral history of Doğukan Ergin
Year	Body	Party	Pos.	Votes	Result		Ref.
Year	Body	Party	Pos.	Votes	Party seats	Individual	Ref.
2021	House of Representatives	DENK	12	1,577	3	Lost	
2023	House of Representatives	DENK	2	15,428	3	Won	
2025	House of Representatives	DENK	2	20,180	3	Won	

== See also ==
- List of members of the House of Representatives of the Netherlands, 2023–present
