= Henri Swinkels =

Dutch politician

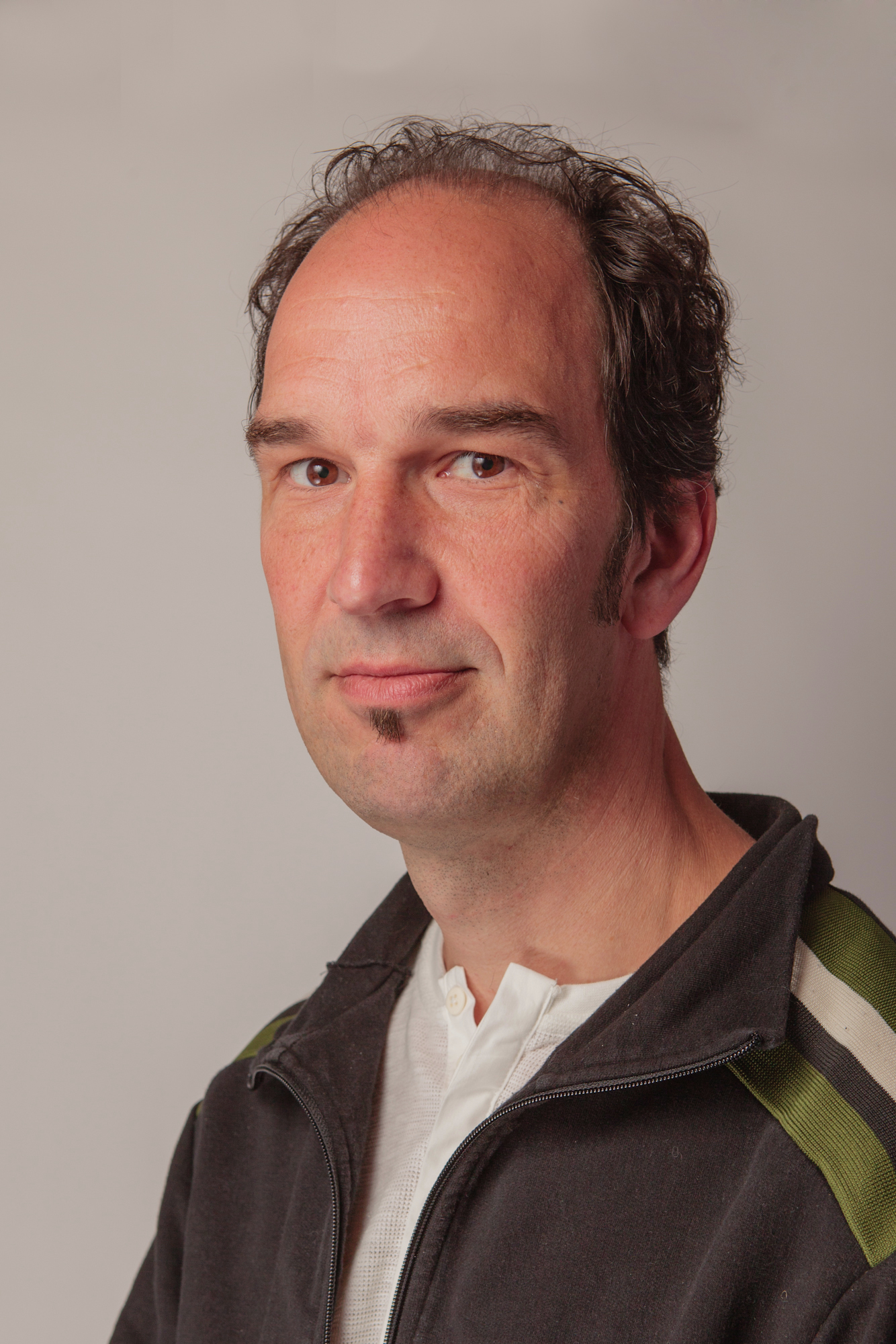

Member of the Provincial-Executive of North Brabant
- In office 22 May 2015 – June 2019

Member of the House of Representatives of the Netherlands
- In office 14 May 2014 – 29 May 2014

Personal details
- Born: 25 October 1963 (age 61); Vught, Netherlands
- Political party: Socialist Party

Henri Swinkels (born 25 October 1963) is a Dutch politician of the Socialist Party. He served as a temporary member of the House of Representatives of the Netherlands in 2014. Between 2015 and 2019 he was a member of the Provincial-Executive of North Brabant.

== Career ==
Swinkels was born on 25 October 1963 in Vught. He worked as a trainer at the trade union FNV between 1992 and 1999. He then started working as a trainings coordinator for the Nederlandse Politiebond, a Dutch trade union for police officers. He was in this position until January 2014 when he joined the Socialist Party group in the House of Representatives of the Netherlands as fraction employee concerned with social affairs and employment. He served as a temporary member of the House of Representatives from 14 May 2014 until 29 May 2014 when he replaced Renske Leijten who was on pregnancy and maternity leave. He continued as fraction employee until May 2015.

He was a municipal councillor in Vught for the Socialist Party between 16 March 2006 and 22 May 2015. He resigned from the council when he became a member of the provincial-executive of North Brabant with the portfolio of livability and culture. He served until June 2019.

He became director of Kunstloc on 1 January 2021.
