= Selçuk Öztürk =

Dutch politician

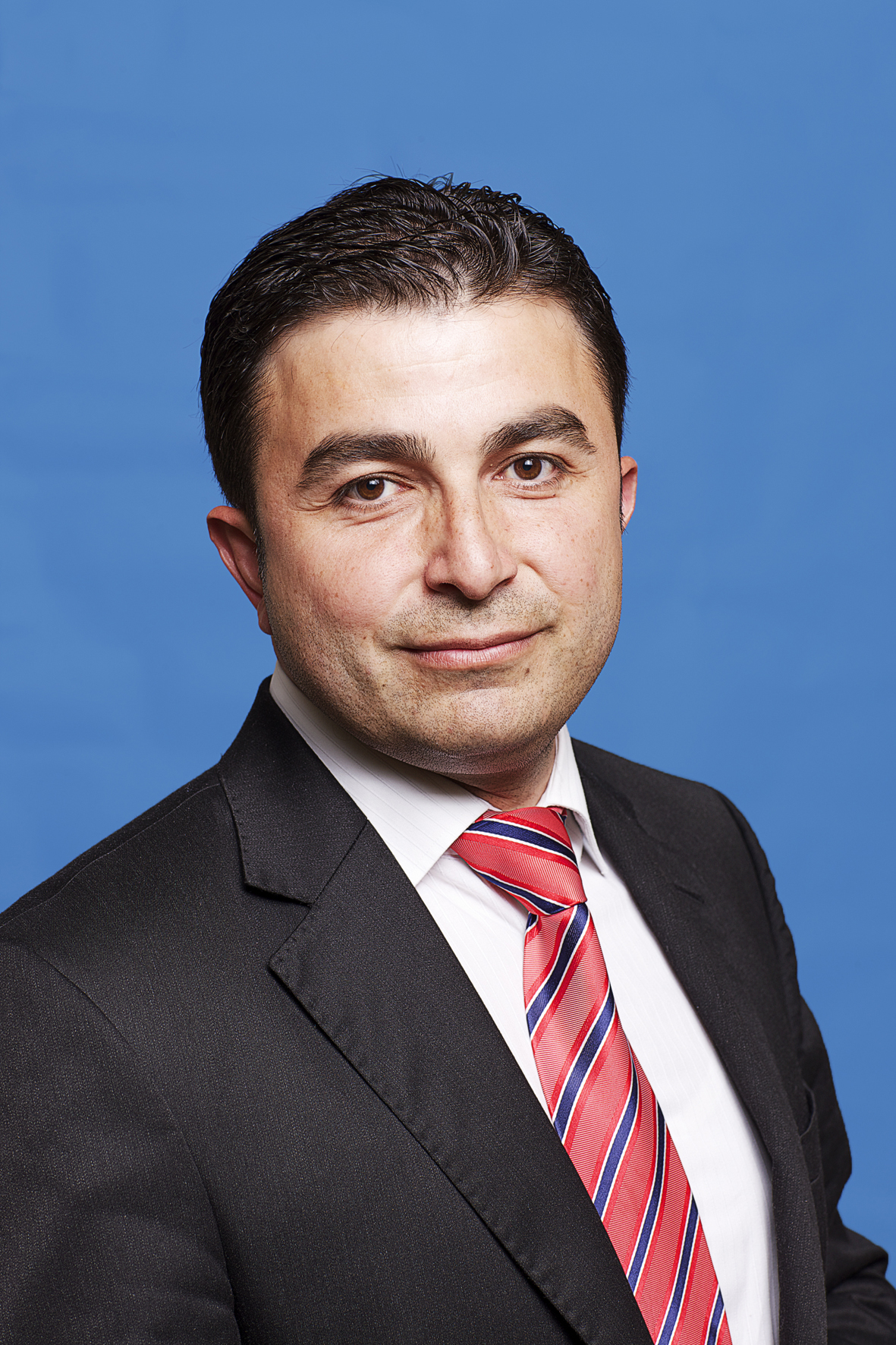
- Selçuk Öztürk in 2011

Member of the House of Representatives
- In office 8 November 2012 – 30 March 2021

Personal details
- Born: 8 April 1972 (age 54) Büyükkışla, Şereflikoçhisar, Turkey
- Party: DENK (2015–present)
- Other political affiliations: Labour Party (1998–2014); Independent (2014–2015)

Selçuk Öztürk (born 8 April 1972) is a Dutch politician of Turkish descent who served as an MP from 8 November 2012 until 30 March 2021. He is a former member of the Labour Party (PvdA). On 13 November 2014, Öztürk and Tunahan Kuzu left the Labor Party and have formed the Group Kuzu/Öztürk, later renamed DENK .

== Biography ==
=== Career ===
Öztürk moved to the Netherlands from Turkey at the age of three with his father. He works as a management consultant. Öztürk was also a member of the provincial parliament of the province of Limburg between 11 March 2011 and 1 December 2012, and a member of the municipal council of Roermond from 1998 until 2013. During this time, he received media attention for getting into a series of disputes with the PVV on Limburg Council.

Öztürk was first elected to parliament at the 2012 Dutch general election for the Labour Party. As a Member of Parliament, Öztürk was, among other things, spokesperson for internal affairs, economic affairs and defence. His videos on social media of the voting behaviour of fellow members with a migrant background sometimes brought him into conflict with the Speaker of the House. In November 2014, he and his colleague Tunahan Kuzu left the Labour Party after they proved unwilling to express their confidence in their own faction's position in the integration debate and in Minister Lodewijk Asscher's proposed integration policy. Their departure caused public commotion after Öztürk shouted "May Allah punish you!" at fellow Labour MP Ahmed Marcouch during a meeting. This was criticised by Labour MP Diederik Samsom who described the statement as threatening. He and Kuzu continued in parliament as the Kuzu/Öztürk Group which later became Denk with Kuzu serving as leader and Öztürk chairman.

In July 2016, NRC Handelsblad published an article accusing Öztürk of profiting from a dubious real estate deal and had concealed business interests from the House of Representatives ethics committee. According to Denk, this was part of a smear campaign against the party. In 2020, NRC admitted to making mistakes in the article.

In March 2020, Öztürk and Kuzu became embroiled in a power struggle within Denk which also involved Öztürk and new leader Farid Azarkan being involved in public disputes. This eventually culminated in Öztürk resigning as party chairman. He stood down from Parliament at the 2021 general election.
