= Renske Leijten =

Dutch politician (born 1979)

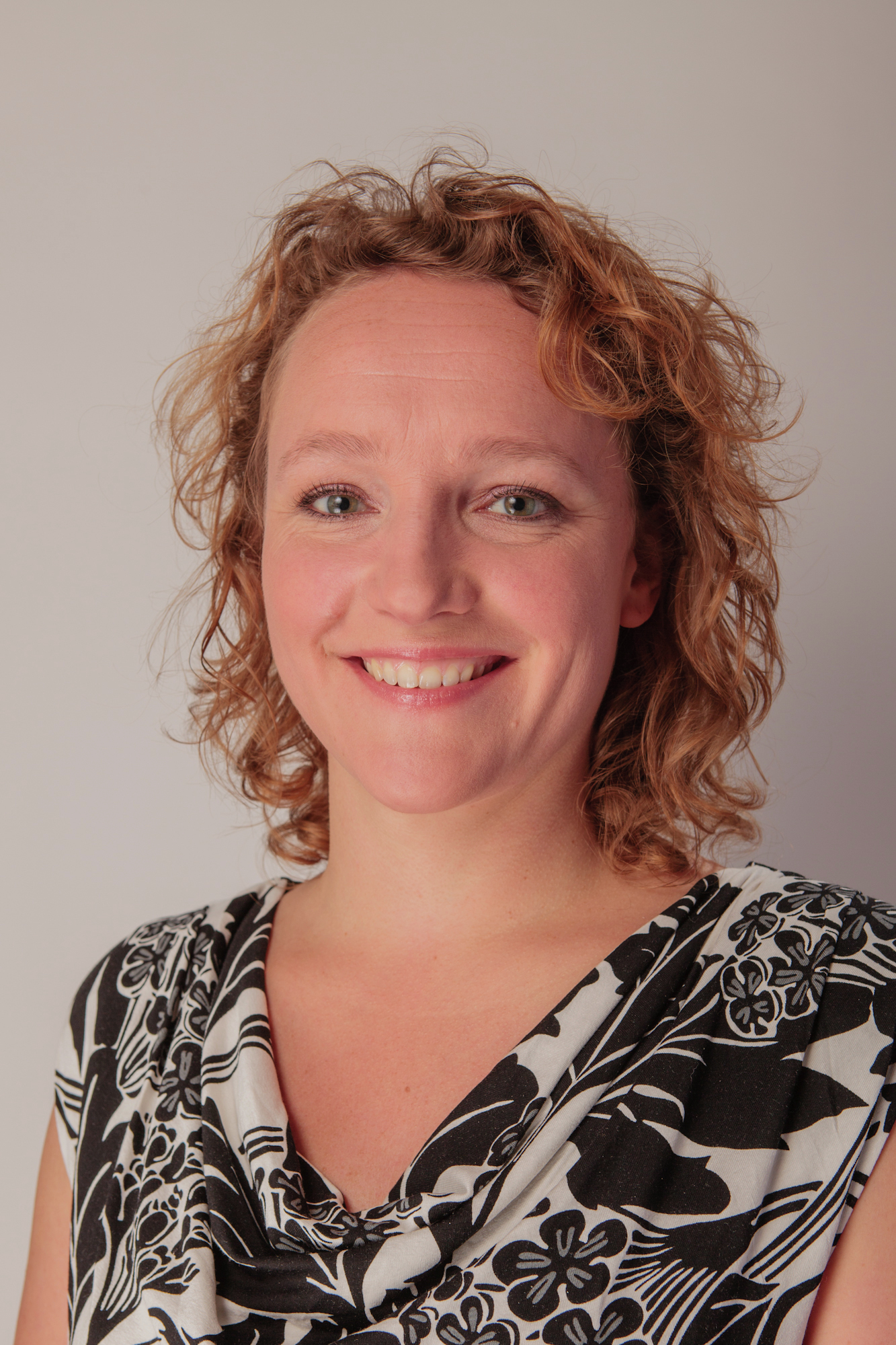
- Leijten in 2012

Member of the House of Representatives
- In office 30 November 2006 – 4 July 2023
- Succeeded by: Nicole Temmink

Personal details
- Born: Renske Maria Leijten; 17 March 1979 (age 47) Leiden, Netherlands
- Party: Socialist Party
- Children: 2
- Education: University of Groningen (BA)
- Occupation: Politician
- Website: (in Dutch) Party website

Renske Maria Leijten (born 17 March 1979) is a Dutch politician of the Socialist Party (SP), who was a member of the House of Representatives between 2006 and 2023.

== Biography ==
Leijten studied Dutch language and literature at the University of Groningen. She was raised Roman Catholic but is now agnostic. Starting in 2005, she was a member of SP's party executive committee. From 2005 to 2007 she was also chairwoman of SP's youth organization ROOD.

She was first elected to the House of Representatives in the 2006 general election. She focused on matters of public health, quality of life and sports. From 6 February 2014 until 29 May 2014 she was temporarily absent due to maternity leave, she was first replaced by Tjitske Siderius, and starting on 14 May 2014 by Henri Swinkels. She rose to prominence through the uncovering by Pieter Omtzigt and her of the childcare benefits scandal, which led to the resignation of the third Rutte cabinet. Leijten announced she would leave politics on 1 July 2023, and she vacated her seat in the House of Representatives three days later. She told that she had made the decision in February and elaborated that one can no longer function when frustration dominates.

== Electoral history ==
Electoral history of Renske Leijten
Year	Body	Party	Pos.	Votes	Result		Ref.
Year	Body	Party	Pos.	Votes	Party seats	Individual	Ref.
2006	House of Representatives	Socialist Party	9	4,791	25	Won	
2010	House of Representatives	Socialist Party	4	41,115	15	Won	
2012	House of Representatives	Socialist Party	2	69,146	15	Won	
2017	House of Representatives	Socialist Party	2	57,956	14	Won	
2021	House of Representatives	Socialist Party	2	143,924	9	Won	
2023	House of Representatives	Socialist Party	50 (Note: Leijten participated as lijstduwer.)	6,960	5	Lost	
