= Tunahan Kuzu =

Dutch politician (born 1981)

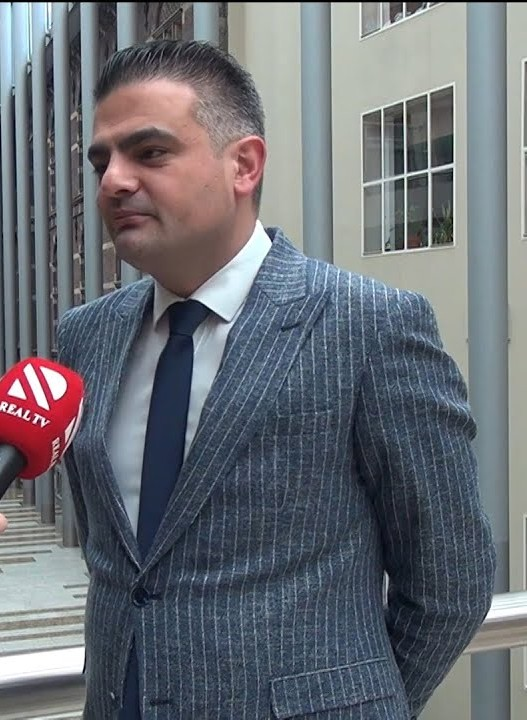
- Tunahan Kuzu in 2021

Member of the House of Representatives
- In office 20 September 2012 – 5 December 2023

Leader of Denk in the House of Representatives
- In office 9 February 2015 – 21 March 2020
- Preceded by: Position established
- Succeeded by: Farid Azarkan

Member of the municipal council of Rotterdam
- In office 22 May 2008 – 27 September 2012

Personal details
- Born: 5 June 1981 (age 45) Istanbul, Turkey
- Party: Denk (2015–present)
- Other political affiliations: Labour Party (2012–2014); Independent (2014–2015)
- Education: Erasmus University Rotterdam

Tunahan Kuzu (born 5 June 1981) is a Dutch politician of Turkish descent who served as an MP from 20 September 2012 until 5 December 2023. Initially he was a member of the Labour Party (PvdA) and on 13 November 2014 Kuzu and Selçuk Öztürk left the Labour Party and formed the Group Kuzu/Öztürk, later renamed Denk ("Think"). On 18 November 2014, he became Parliamentary group leader. In the 2017 Dutch general election, the party secured three seats in the House of Representatives. He was succeeded as party leader by Farid Azarkan in 2020.

== Early life ==
Kuzu grew up in Maassluis and studied public administration at Erasmus University Rotterdam. He worked as a health care advisor for PricewaterhouseCoopers, and was also a member of the municipal council of Rotterdam from 2008 to 2012.

== Controversies ==
=== Relations with Israel ===
Kuzu attracted international attention in September 2016 when he refused to shake the hand of Prime Minister of Israel Benjamin Netanyahu before a meeting at the States General of the Netherlands. In a statement posted to Facebook Kuzu explained his action as a protest against human rights abuses committed against Palestinian civilians in the Palestinian territories.

In May 2019, during a visit to Jerusalem to learn about the situation of the Palestinians in Israel, Kuzu was held up on the Temple Mount while carrying a Palestinian flag. According to Farid Azarkan, Kuzu was "taken by a large group of heavily armed soldiers". Kuzu was not arrested, however, he was stopped and released after an hour.

== Electoral history ==
A (possibly incomplete) overview of Dutch elections Kuzu participated in
Election	Party	Candidate number	Votes
2010 Dutch municipal elections in Rotterdam	Labour Party	10	1.697
2012 Dutch general election	Labour Party	27	23.067
2014 Dutch municipal elections in Rotterdam	Labour Party	29	418
2017 Dutch general election	Denk	1	129.025
2018 Dutch municipal elections in Rotterdam	Denk	20	
2019 Dutch provincial elections in North Holland	Denk	24	2.881
2019 Dutch provincial elections in South Holland	Denk	50	9.789
2019 European Parliament election in the Netherlands	Denk	14	20.350
2021 Dutch general election	Denk	2	70.374
2022 Dutch special municipal elections in Amsterdam	Denk	15	1.973
2022 Dutch municipal elections in Rotterdam	Denk	17	
